= Jiaomen =

Jiaomen may refer to:

- Jiaomen Station, on Line 4, Guangzhou Metro, China
- Jiaomen West Station, on Line 4 and Line 10, Beijing Subway, China
- Jiaomen East Station, Line 10, Beijing Subway, China
