= Huoqiying station =

Beijing Subway station

Huoqiying 火器营
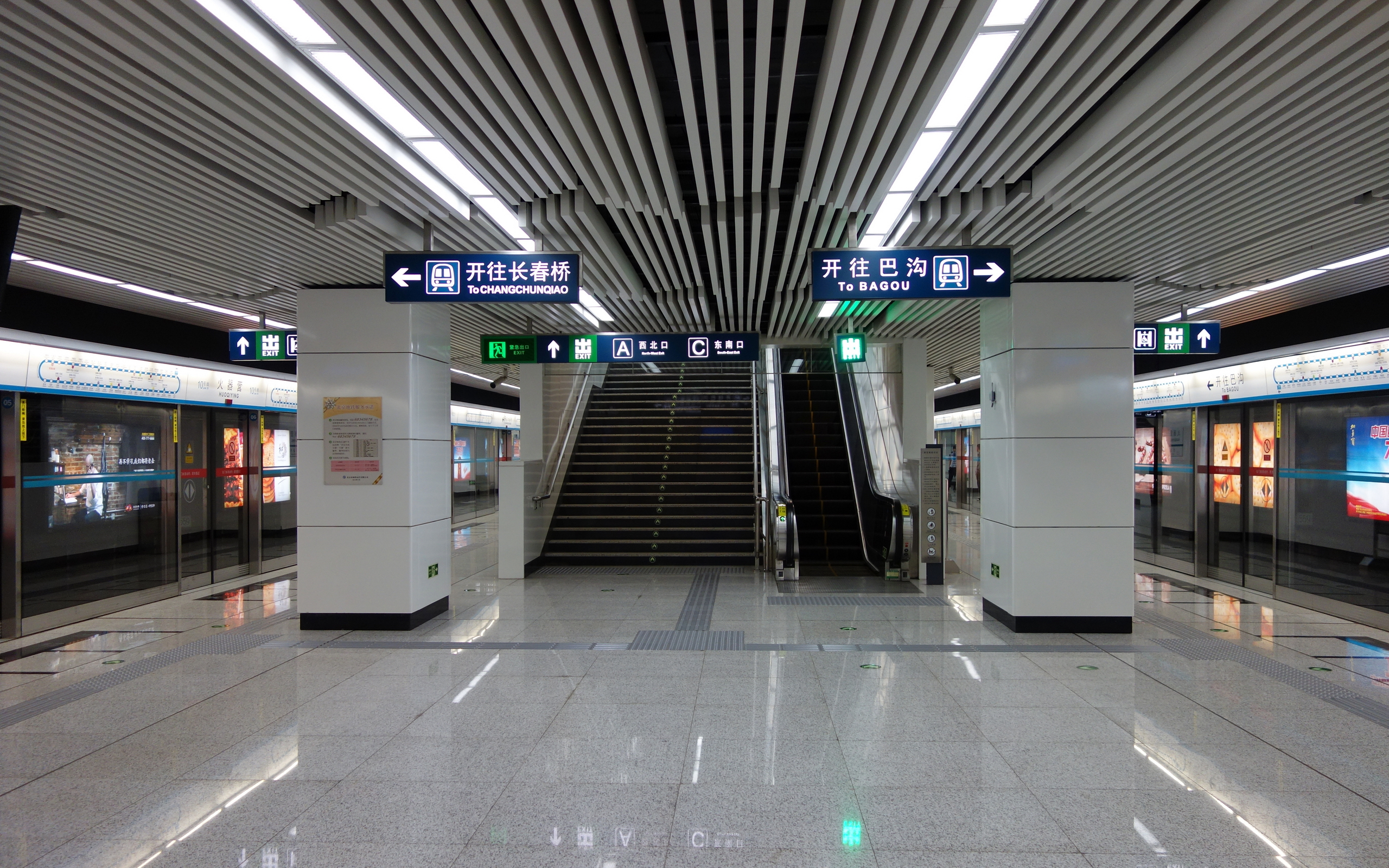
- Platform

General information
- Location: Landianchang North Road (蓝靛厂北路) and Landianchang Road (蓝靛厂路); Shuguang Subdistrict, Haidian District, Beijing; China
- Coordinates: 39.965938°N 116.289058°E
- Operator: Beijing Mass Transit Railway Operation Corporation Limited
- Line: Line 10
- Platforms: 2 (1 island platform)
- Tracks: 2

Construction
- Structure type: Underground
- Accessible: Yes

History
- Opened: December 30, 2012; 13 years ago

Services
Preceding station	Beijing Subway	Following station
Changchun Qiao outer loop / anticlockwise	Line 10	Bagou inner loop / clockwise
Location
- Location within Beijing

Huoqiying station (simplified Chinese: 火器营站; traditional Chinese: 火器營站; pinyin: Huǒqìyíng Zhàn) is a station on Line 10 of the Beijing Subway. This station opened on December 30, 2012.

The name of the station is after the Firearm Battalion (Huoqiying) of the Qing dynasty.

== Station layout ==
The station has an underground island platform.

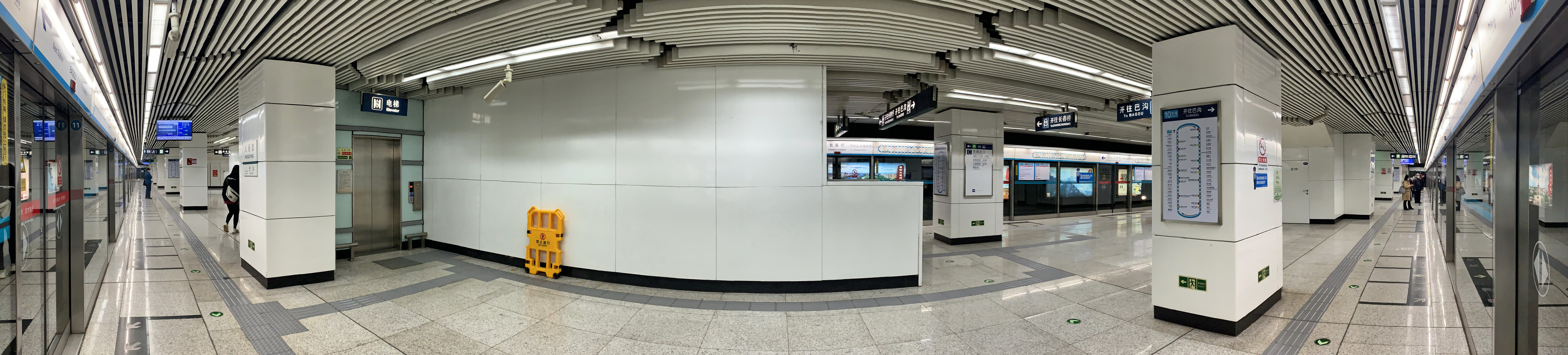
Platform panorama (April 2021)

== Exits ==
There are 2 exits, lettered A and C. Exit A is accessible.

== Gallery ==
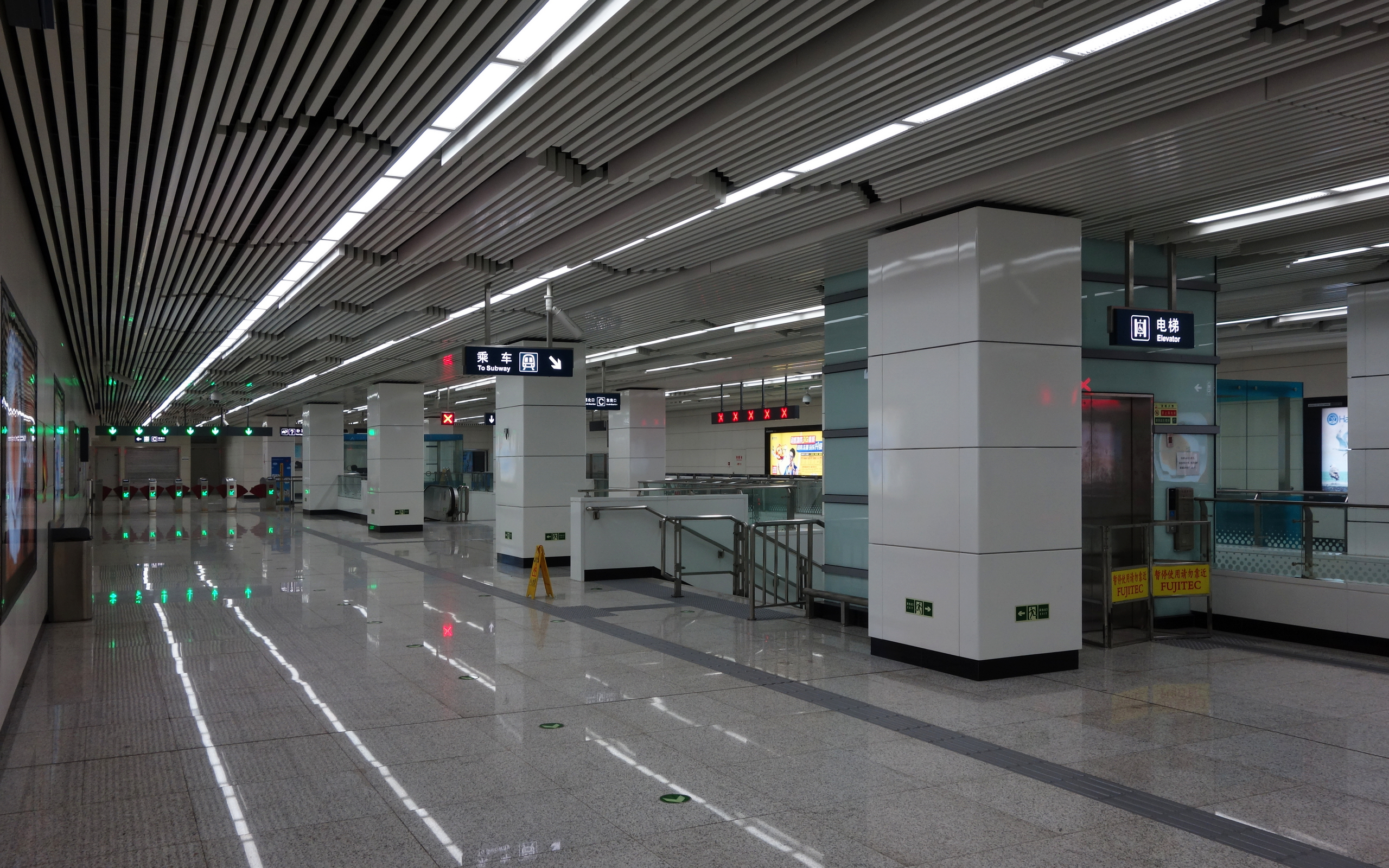
Station Hall

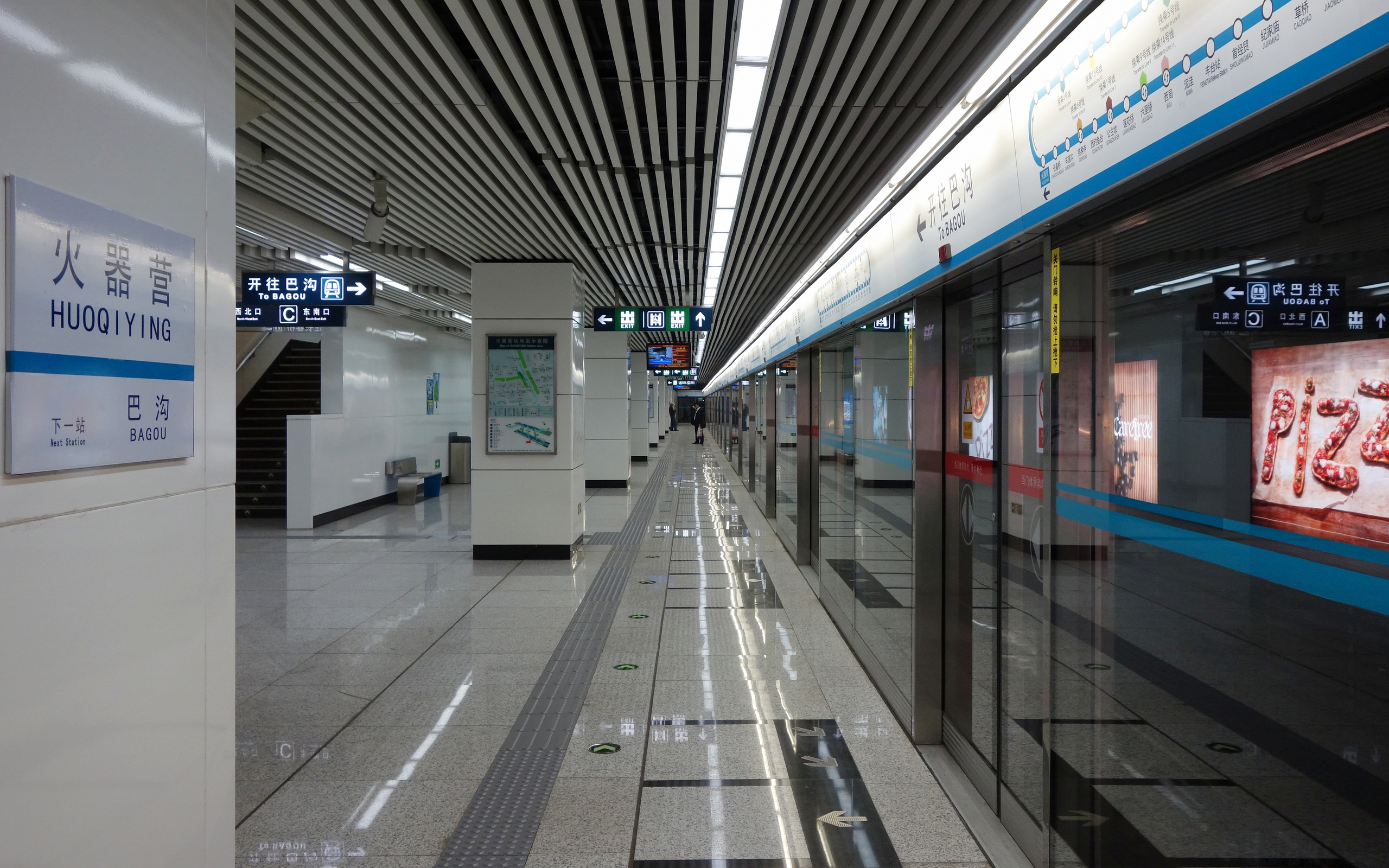
Platform

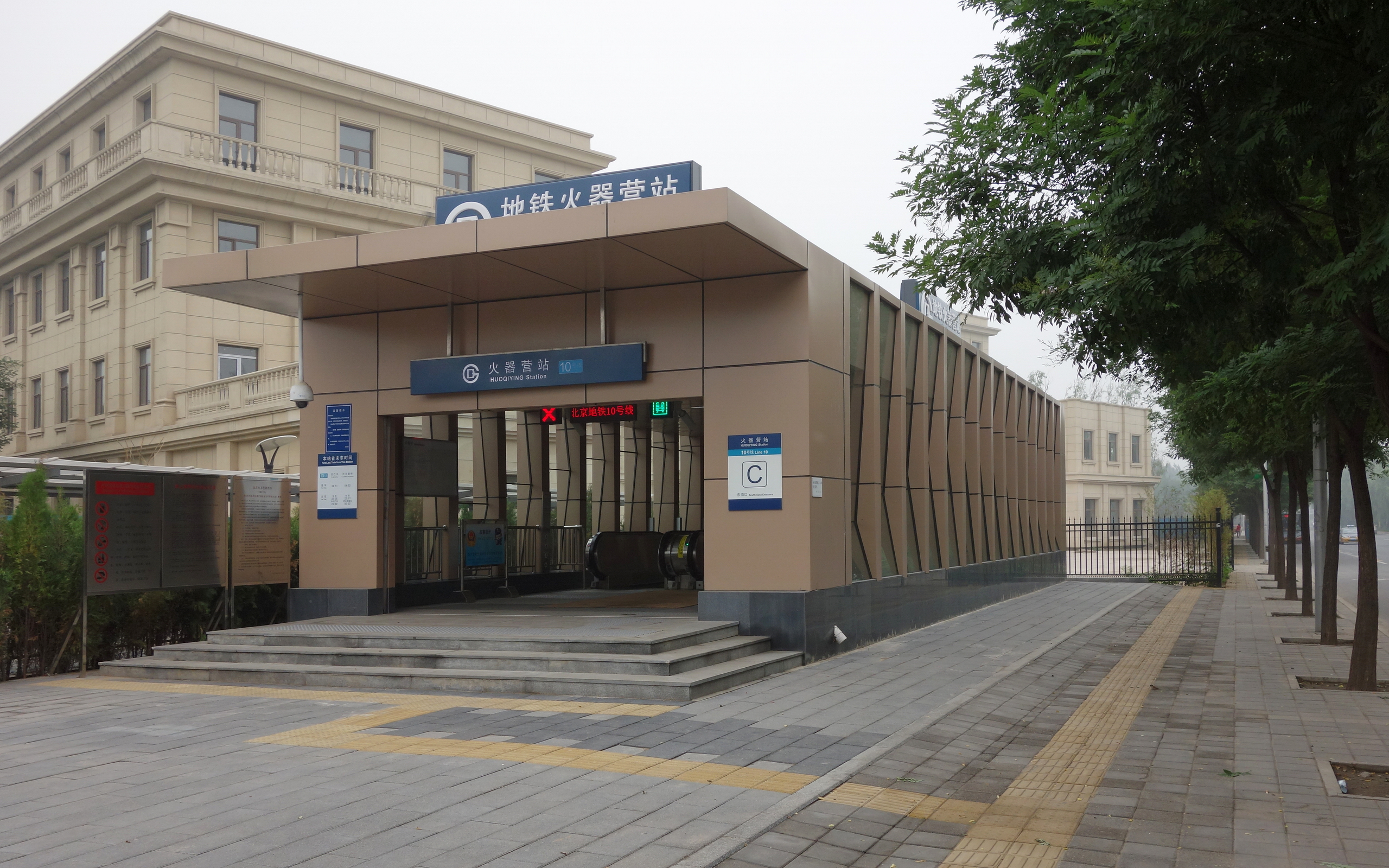
Entrance (C) of Huoqiying Station
