= Line 10 (Beijing Subway) =

Rapid transit line in Beijing, China

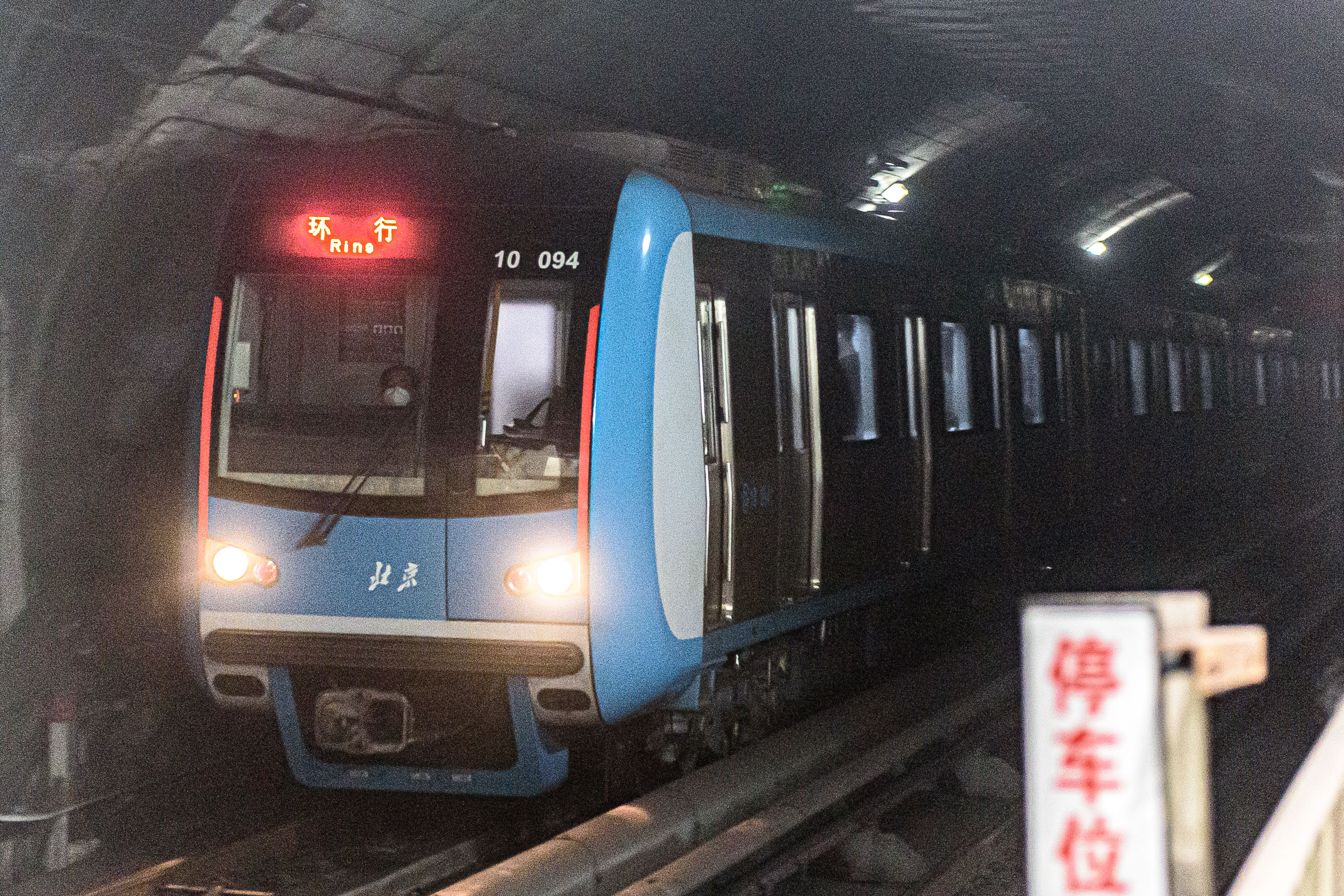
- A Line 10 train entering Haidian Huangzhuang station

Overview
- Other name: M10 (planned name)
- Status: Operational
- Locale: Haidian, Chaoyang and Fengtai districts Beijing
- Stations: 45

Service
- Type: Rapid transit
- System: Beijing Subway
- Operator(s): Beijing Mass Transit Railway Operation Corp., Ltd
- Depot(s): Wanliu, Wulu, Songjiazhuang
- Rolling stock: 6-car Type B (DKZ15, DKZ34, DKZ46)
- Daily ridership: 1,495,500 (2024 Avg.); 2,076,500 (2014 Peak)

History
- Opened: 19 July 2008; 18 years ago

Technical
- Line length: 57.024 km (35.4 mi)
- Character: Underground
- Track gauge: 1,435 mm (4 ft 8 1/2 in) standard gauge
- Electrification: 750 V DC Third rail
- Operating speed: 80 km/h (50 mph)

Line 10 of the Beijing Subway (Chinese: 北京地铁10号线; pinyin: běijīng dìtiě shíhào xiàn) is the second loop line in Beijing's rapid transit network as well as the second longest and most widely used line. The line is 57.024 km (35.433 mi) in length, and runs entirely underground through Haidian, Chaoyang and Fengtai Districts, either directly underneath or just beyond the 3rd Ring Road. The Line 10 loop is situated between 2 and 6 kilometres (1.243 and 3.728 mi) outside the Line 2 loop, and intersects with every subways line through the city centre, with 24 transfer stations and 45 stations in all. The line's color is capri.

Upon completion in May 2013, it held the record as the world's longest rapid transit loop line, an accolade it held until March 2023. (Note: As of March 2023, Line 10 of Beijing Subway is the second longest rapid transit loop line after Bolshaya Koltsevaya line of Moscow Metro.) It remains one of the longest entirely underground subway lines in the world, requiring 104 minutes to complete one full journey in either direction.. It's also the second longest subway loop line in Mainland China (The first is Line 12 of Wuhan Metro).

== History ==
Segment	Commencement	Length	Station(s)	Name
Bagou — Jingsong	19 July 2008	24.680 km (15.335 mi)	22	Phase 1
Xiju — Bagou	30 December 2012	13.843 km (8.602 mi)	9	Phase 2 (initial section)
Jingsong — Capital Univ. of Economics & Business	30 December 2012	15.932 km (9.900 mi)	11	Phase 2 (initial section)
Capital Univ. of Economics & Business — Xiju	5 May 2013	3.420 km (2.125 mi)	2	Phase 2 (final section)
Jiaomendong	5 May 2013	Infill station	1	

=== Planning ===
The Beijing Subway network was originally conceived to have only one loop line. The booming economy and explosive population growth of Beijing put huge demand on Line 2, surpassing its designed capacity. In 2001 and 2002, the China Academy of Urban Planning and Design proposed two "L-shaped" lines named Line 10 and 11. Together they would form a second loop around Beijing and relieve pressure on line 2.

=== Phase I ===
On December 27, 2003, in preparation for the 2008 Summer Olympics in Beijing, Phase 1 of Line 10 started construction. On July 19, 2008, Phase I of Line 10 entered operation ahead of the opening of the Olympic Games. It was 24.68 km (15.34 mi) in length and had 22 stations. Phase I consisted of the northern and eastern sides of Line 10's rectangular loop from Bagou to Jingsong forming an inverted L-shaped line.

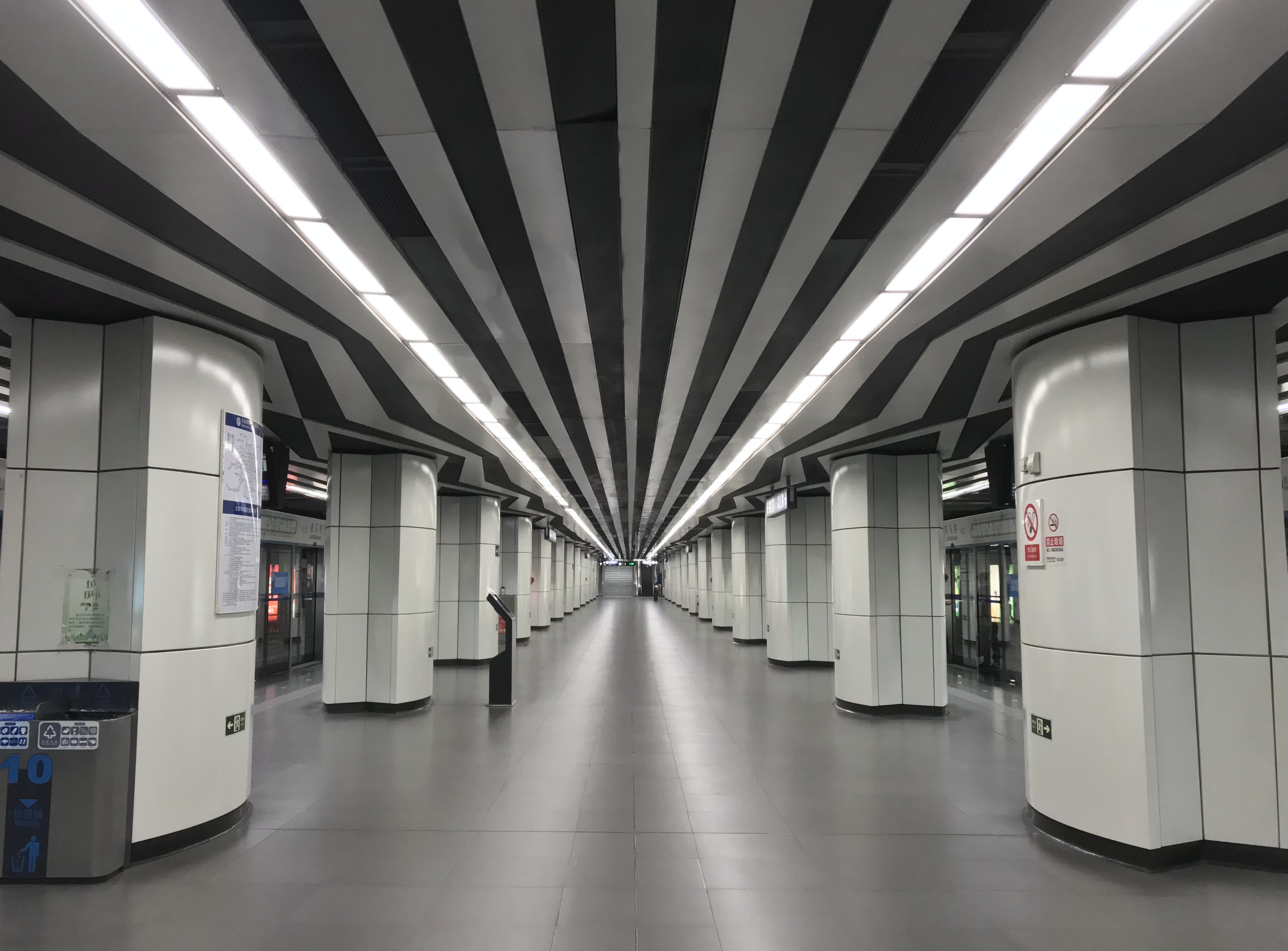
Liangmaqiao Station

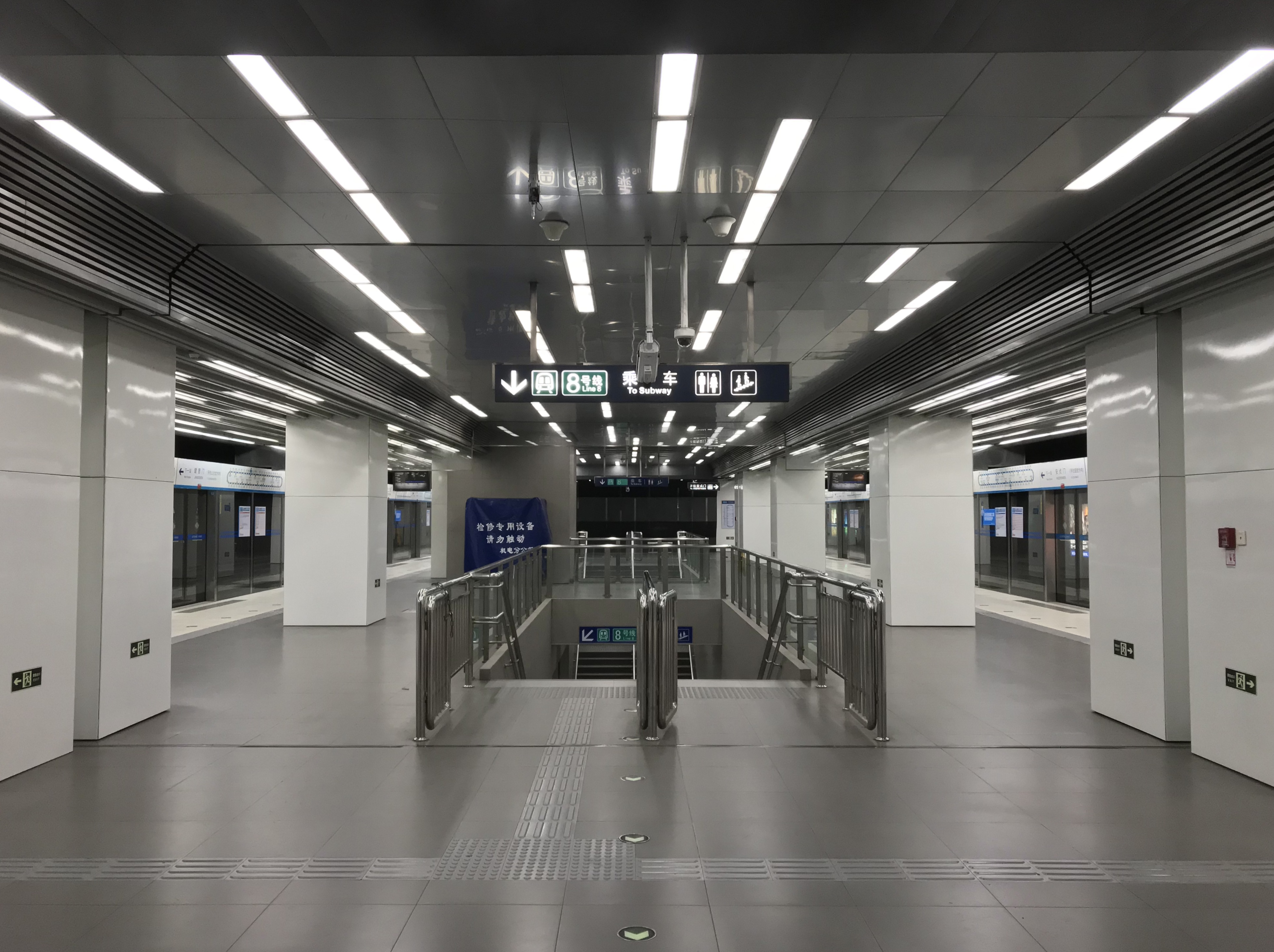
Beitucheng Station

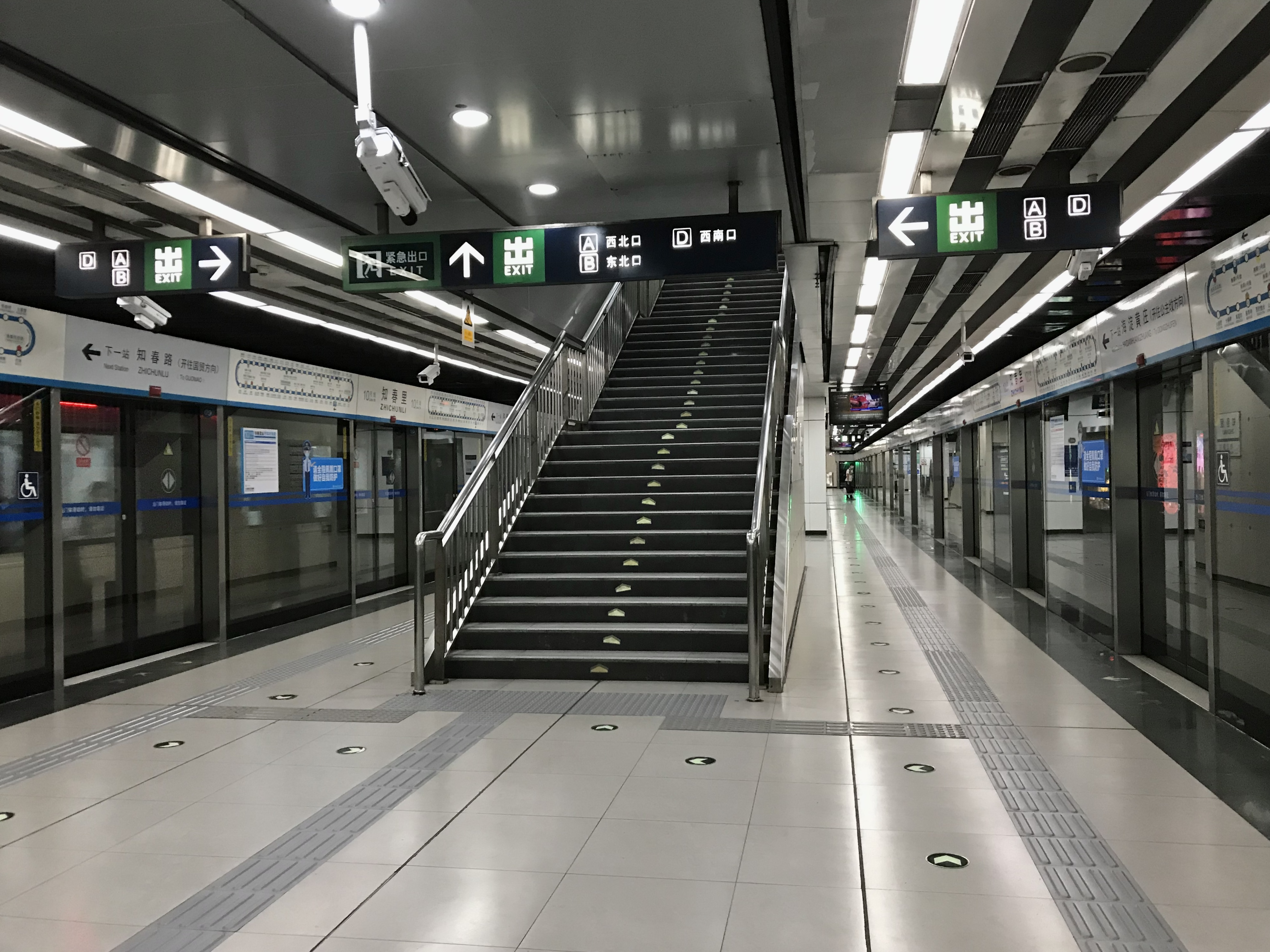
Zhichunli Station

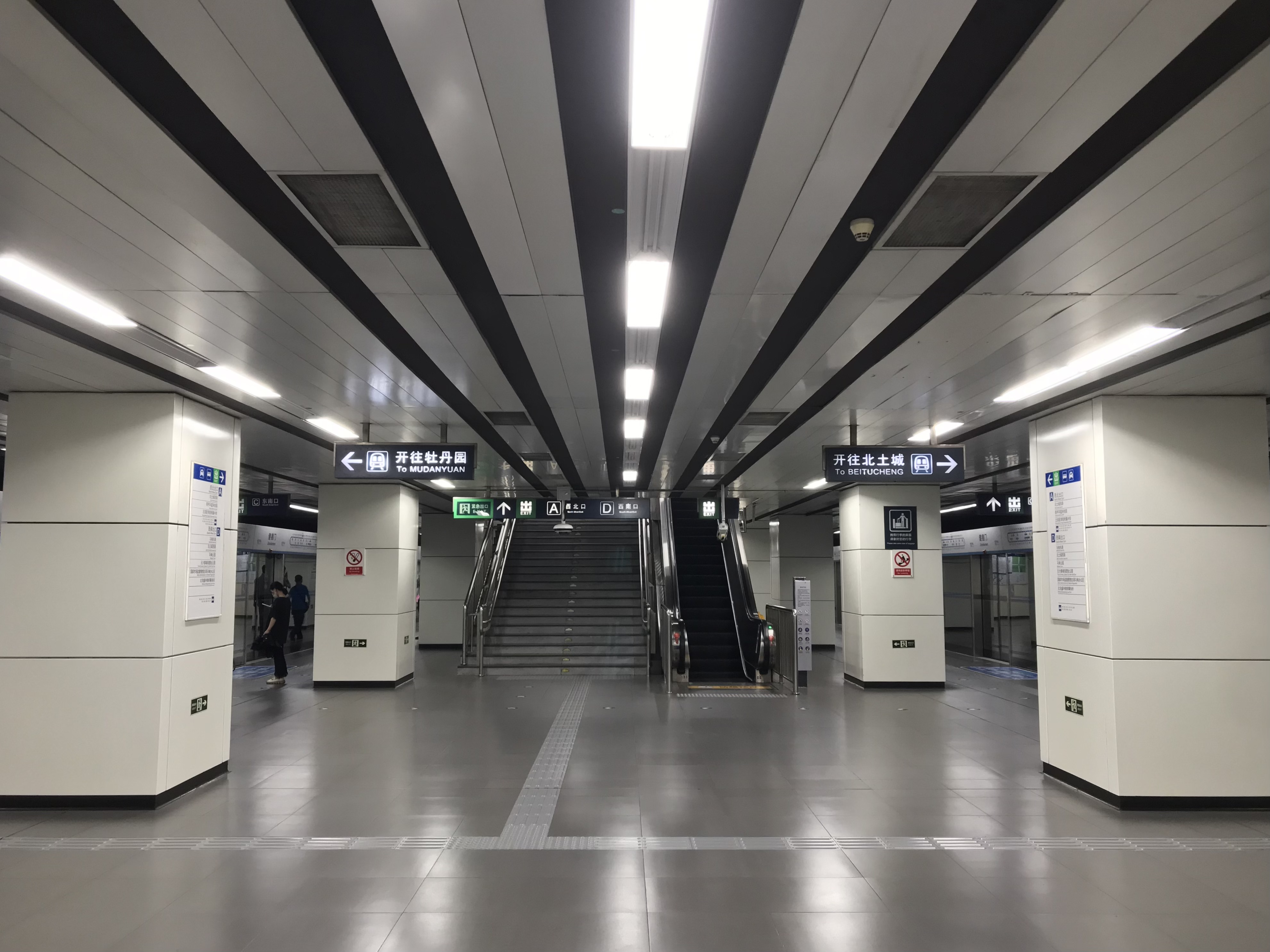
Jiandemen Station

=== Phase II ===
Construction on Phase II began on December 28, 2007. which meant that the original plan for Line 11 was not incorporated into the final network design and was instead absorbed into Line 10. Line 10 formed the second full loop around Beijing. In 2010, the Ministry of Railways proposed that Fengtai Railway Station was to be renovated and expanded to become a bigger intercity rail terminal for Beijing, with access to the Beijing-Guangzhou high-speed railway. The rationale was to ease intercity traffic pressure on Beijing West railway station. Due to the need to reorganize the stations on Line 10 to better serve the new rail terminal, work stopped on 2 stations, namely Mengjiacun (孟家村) and Niwa (泥洼). The planning department proposed that the original Mengjiacun and Niwa subway stations be merged into the new Fengtai railway station, known as the "three stations into one" program. Local residents, after realizing their travel to a subway station would be greatly lengthened, quickly opposed the plan. Planners reconsidered and moved Niwa station 300 m (984 ft) north to its current position and Mengjiacun station 100 m (328 ft) north to be renamed as Fengtai Railway Station. The original station shells were demolished and new stations built in their respective new locations. Niwa station started reconstruction in February 2012, while Fengtai railway station started on April 11, 2012. This made the late 2012 opening date for that section of Line 10 highly unlikely and was postponed to the next year. On December 30, 2012, the first section of Phase II, consisting of the southern and western sides of the loop opened. With the opening of Phase I and Phase II, Line 10 became a "C" shape.

The near completion of Line 10 led to rapid growth of Line 10's ridership. At the same time, some traffic from Line 1 was diverted to the parallel and newly opened Line 6, allowing Line 10 to overtake Line 1 as Beijing's busiest subway line. The Beijing Subway started operating express trains that ran non-stop between Songjiazhuang to Jinsong to alleviate traffic in the southeastern section of Line 10. These express trains stopped operating after the completion of the loop.

The loop was fully enclosed on May 5, 2013 with the opening of Fengtai and Niwa stations, as well as the infill Jiaomen East. Initially, Line 10 services consisted of a "full-loop" service that make the journey through all 45 stations in 104 minutes, and "partial-loop" trains that run from Chedaogou in the north-west to Songjiazhuang in the south-east before turning back. With the delivery of more rolling stock, "partial-loop" trains were removed and all trains are now serving the full loop at a headway of 2 minutes and 15 seconds. By 2014, the completed loop carried on average 1.69 million passengers per day. By 2019, large sections of Line 10 operated above 100% capacity, particularly the eastern and northern sections. Beijing Subway has responded by increasing the frequency of trains to every two minutes and removing some seats on trains to increase capacity.

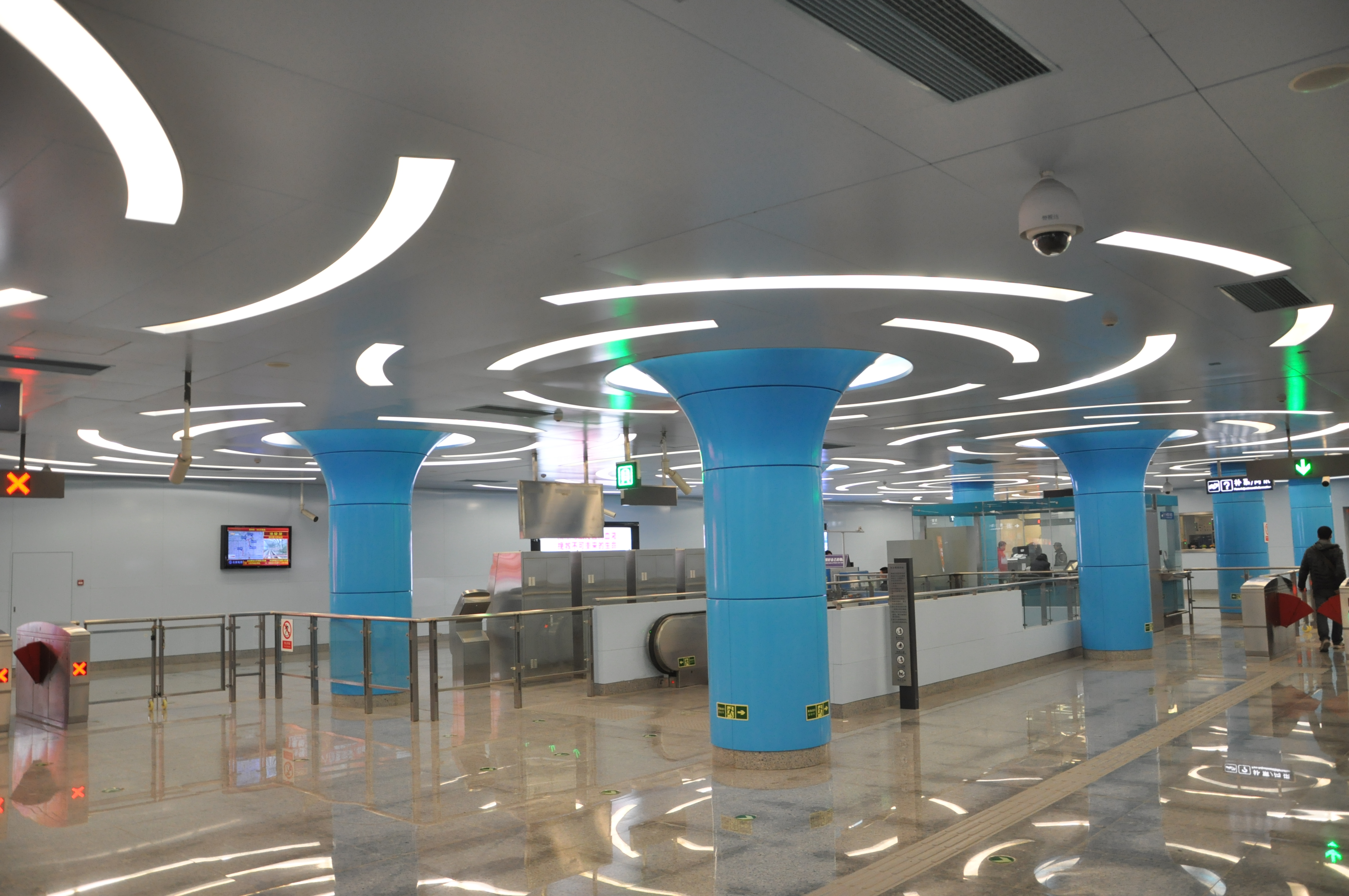
Concourse of Panjiayuan station

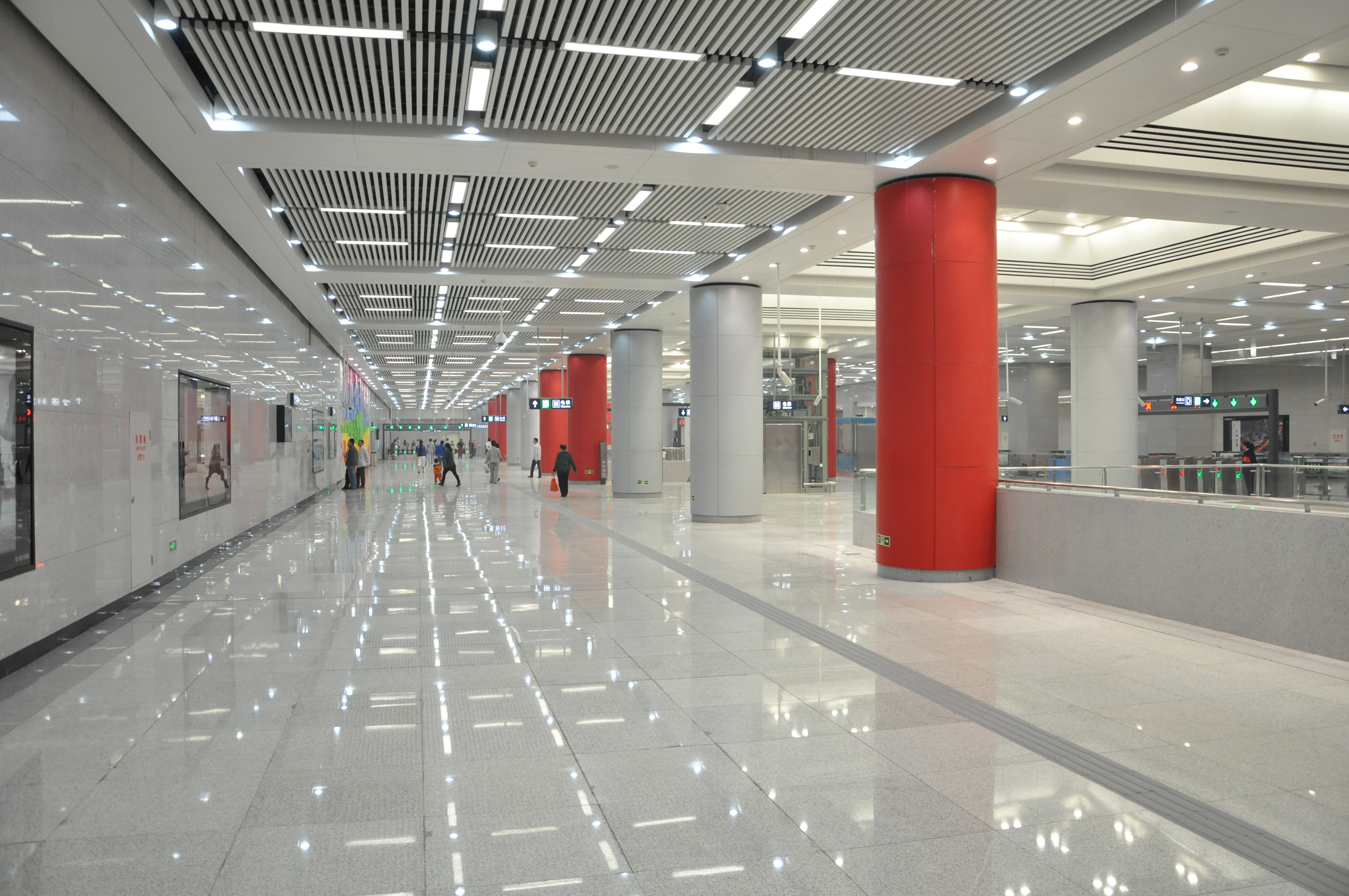
Concourse of Fengtai Railway Station (subway station)

Ceiling of Gongzhufen station, Line 10

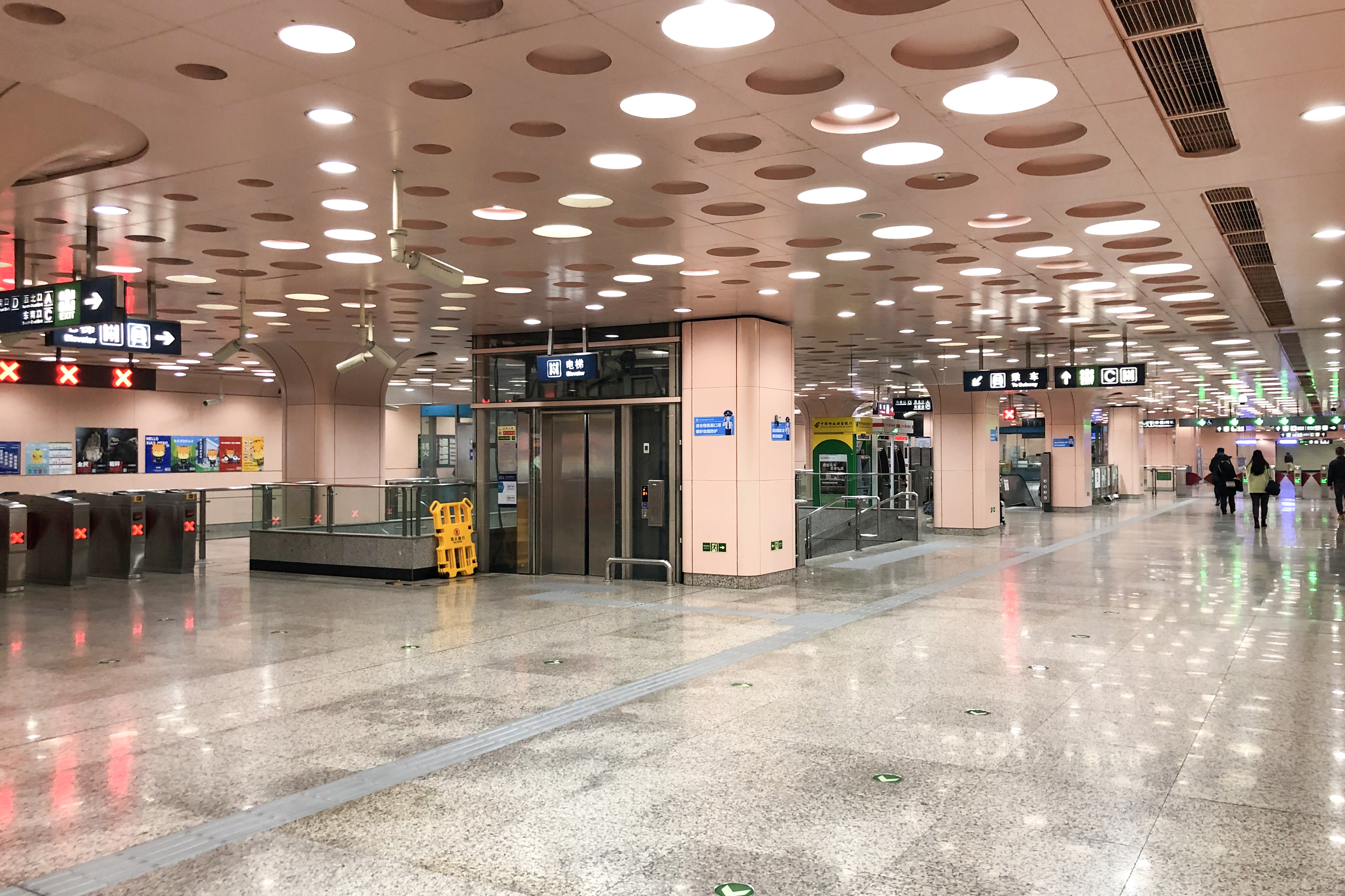
Concourse of Dahongmen station, Line 10

== Operation ==
Line 10 to scale

From Bagou near Wanliu Park in Haidian District, Line 10 runs straight east, between the northern 3rd and 4th Ring Roads. At Xitucheng, the line meets the northern section of the Yuan dynasty earthen city wall, called tucheng. Jiandemen and Anzhenmen stations are named after former gates in the wall. At Beitucheng, Line 8 (Phase 1) extends off Line 10 and provides access to the Beijing Olympic Green. Farther east, Line 10 turns south after the Sanyuanqiao and follows the eastern 3rd Ring Road straight south to Jingsong in Chaoyang District. The Bagou-Jingsong section constituted Phase I of Line 10, which first opened in July 2008, and connects the university district in Haidian with the embassy district and Beijing CBD. A trip from Bagou to Jingsong takes about 40 minutes. The full loop takes about 104 minutes.

=== Fare ===
Starting fare of RMB(¥) 3 that increases according to the distance fare scheme introduced in December 2014.

Regular subway users can use a Yikatong card, which offers even cheaper journeys, as well as mobile phone apps, which deploy payment via a QR code.

=== Hours of Operation ===
The first train on the inner (clockwise) loop departs from Xiju towards Shoujingmao at 5:20 am. The first train on the outer (counter-clockwise) loop departs from Shoujingmao towards Xiju at 6:12 am. The last inner loop train leaves Xiju for Bagou at 11:29 pm. The last outer loop train leaves Shoujingmao for Chedaogou at 11:06 pm. For the official timetable, see.

=== Safety ===
There are subway public security bureaus (police stations) located in the Bagou, Beitucheng and Liangmaqiao stations. Emergencies can be reported by calling 110 or 64011327.

== Stations ==
Some trains terminate at stations marked '*'.

Station Name		Connections	Nearby Bus Stops	Travel Time	Distance km		Location
English	Chinese	Connections	Nearby Bus Stops	Travel Time	Distance km		Location
— ↑ loop line - towards Huoqiying ↑ —					-1.495		
Bagou	巴沟*	Xijiao	74 302 307 361 386 424 534 539 613 614 630 644 快速直达专线26 通医专线6	0:00	0.000	0.000	Haidian
Suzhou Jie	苏州街	16	26 56 302 307 361 386 424 450 528 613 630 634 644 671 688 快速直达专线26 快速直达专线37 快速直达专线126 快速直达专线127 快速直达专线177 快速直达专线204	0:02	1.110	1.110	Haidian
Haidian Huangzhuang	海淀黄庄	4	302 305 307 320 332 355 365 386 528 584 614 630 634 653 671 681 快速直达专线26 快速直达专线37 快速直达专线126 快速直达专线127 快速直达专线139 快速直达专线147 通医专线6 夜8	0:04	0.950	2.060	Haidian
Zhichun Li	知春里		323 386 549 579 630 634 653 671	0:06	0.975	3.035	Haidian
Zhichun Lu	知春路	13	311 319 386 579 601 630 653 671 专168	0:08	1.058	4.093	Haidian
Xitucheng	西土城	Changping	21 94 375 386 478 579 601 603 653 658 671 686 693 专32	0:10	1.101	5.194	Haidian
Mudanyuan	牡丹园	19	16 21 22 47 123 135 331 345快 425 508 510 579 601 606 618 620 645 653 658 夜4 专32	0:12	1.330	6.524	Haidian
Jiande Men	健德门		21 55 143 315 344 345 510 601 618 620 625 653 658 695 889 919 夜2 夜38	0:14	0.973	7.497	Haidian / Chaoyang (Note: Jiandemen station straddles the border between Haidian and Chaoyang Districts.)
Beitucheng	北土城	8	5 21 81 82 92 113 142 300快 380 409 515 607 620 653 877 889 919 专8	0:16	1.100	8.597	Chaoyang
Anzhenmen	安贞门		108 117 124 142 301 380 409 515 653 944 BRT3(快速公交3) 夜34 专8	0:18	1.020	9.617	Chaoyang
Huixin Xijie Nankou	惠新西街南口	5	95 125 361 430 515 921 944 夜26	0:21	0.982	10.599	Chaoyang
Shaoyaoju	芍药居	13	119 515 547 567 696 942 快速直达专线41 快速直达专线172 专22	0:24	1.712	12.311	Chaoyang
Taiyanggong	太阳宫	17	130 132 467 515 567 939 专212	0:26	1.003	13.314	Chaoyang
Sanyuan Qiao	三元桥	12 Capital Airport	18 95 104 132 300 300快 302 359 368 379 401 403 404 419 536 604 641 671 850 850快 852 915 916 916快 918 935 935快 939 980快 快速直达专线72 快速直达专线195 快速直达专线196 夜30	0:28	1.759	15.073	Chaoyang
Liangma Qiao	亮马桥		4 95 402 403 405 413 416 419 499 516 536 675 687 985 快速直达专线195 快速直达专线196 夜30 专114	0:31	1.506	16.579	Chaoyang
Agricultural Exhibition Center	农业展览馆		4 95 135 300 300快 302 368 402 405 416 499 516 671 675 687 690 夜30 专114	0:33	0.914	17.493	Chaoyang
Tuanjiehu	团结湖	3	4 39 95 113 115 117 302 405 406 431 499 650 675 687 690 快速直达专线195 快速直达专线196 夜3 夜30 夜34 专5 专114 专142	0:35	0.853	18.346	Chaoyang
Hujialou	呼家楼	6	75 113 115 126 140 350 368 405 412 650 671 687 BRT2(快速公交2) 夜30 夜34 专5 专114	0:37	1.149	19.495	Chaoyang
Jintai Xizhao	金台夕照		9 98 101 113 118 350 368 405 488 615 650 671 687 BRT2(快速公交2) 夜13 夜30 夜34 专114	0:39	0.734	20.229	Chaoyang
Guomao	国贸	1	1 1区 9 11 28 57 58 72 98 113 348 368 382 388 402 405 488 561 650 666 667 668 669 687 804 805快 806 807 809 814 817 818 818快 848 930 938快 938快区 快速直达专线5 快速直达专线9 快速直达专线20 快速直达专线61 夜1 夜27 夜30 专10	0:41	0.835	21.064	Chaoyang
Shuangjing	双井	7	23 28 54 57 72 98 300 300快 312 348 368 402 637 669 687 805快 848 938快 938快区 快速直达专线85 快速直达专线192 通医专线4 夜7 夜29 夜30 专10 专87 专165	0:43	1.759	22.823	Chaoyang
Jingsong	劲松		8 28 29 35 41 52 54 72 91 98 352 368 402 457 535 637 638 687 通医专线4 夜19 夜30	0:45	1.006	23.829	Chaoyang
Panjia Yuan	潘家园		28 34 63 300 300快 368 378 535 638 687 805快 848 938快 938快区 夜30	0:47	1.021	24.850	Chaoyang
Shilihe	十里河	14 17	28 53 300 300快 352 368 378 439 440 513 638 649 680 687 846 848 973 975 976 985 986 995 快速直达专线217 夜30 专19	0:49	1.097	25.947	Chaoyang
Fenzhong Si	分钟寺		352	0:52	1.804	27.751	Fengtai
Chengshou Si	成寿寺*		25 93 128 665 680 821 985 990 快速直达专线182 夜23 专196	0:54	1.058	28.809	Chaoyang
Songjiazhuang	宋家庄*	5 Yizhuang	2 39 84 139 141 366 511 524 526 555 576 581 990 快速直达专线116 快速直达专线211 夜28 专62	0:57	1.677	30.486	Fengtai
Shiliuzhuang	石榴庄		17 120 141 324 820 829 夜28 专76 专130	0:59	1.269	31.755	Fengtai
Dahong Men	大红门	8	54 343 622 687 827 BRT1(快速公交1) 快速直达专线16 专13 专34 专76 专163	1:01	1.244	32.999	Fengtai
Jiaomendong	角门东		14 54 102 343 501 511 687 957 专13 专34 专76 专145 专176	1:03	1.130	34.129	Fengtai
Jiaomenxi	角门西	4	30 51 72 144 474 501 529 646 954 专145 专209	1:06	1.254	35.383	Fengtai
Caoqiao	草桥	19 Daxing Airport	381 410 423 434 456 483 497 529 676 679 专179 专209	1:09	1.688	37.071	Fengtai
Jijiamiao	纪家庙			1:11	1.547	38.618	Fengtai
Capital Univ. of Economics & Business	首经贸	Fangshan	67 351 692 912 通医专线7 专180	1:14	1.143	39.761	Fengtai
Fengtai railway station	丰台站	16 FTP	夜7 专4 专149	1:17	1.717	41.478	Fengtai
Niwa	泥洼		335 349 395 459 678 845	1:19	0.954	42.432	Fengtai
Xiju	西局	14	83 323 458 480 483 531 830 958 969 973 夜36	1:21	0.749	43.181	Fengtai
Liuli Qiao	六里桥	9	57 133 477 554 568 603 838 941 941快 982 专3	1:24	1.584	44.765	Fengtai
Lianhua Qiao	莲花桥		52 62 89 134 323 603 890 890区 977 快速直达专线68 夜30	1:28	2.392	47.157	Haidian
Gongzhufen	公主坟	1	1 1区 32 33 40 52 62 64 68 74 76 77 89 94 134 300 300快 308 323 335 337 368 370 394 437 603 624 631快 698 977 977快 夜1 夜5 夜30	1:30	1.016	48.173	Haidian
Xidiaoyutai	西钓鱼台		4 27 33 40 62 85 87 92 97 121 335 414 481 612 627 632 634 653 686 693 698 967 977 977快 BRT4(快速公交4) 快速直达专线104 快速直达专线137 夜13	1:33	2.386	50.559	Haidian
Cishou Si	慈寿寺*	6	33 40 61 73 85 481 507 632 夜3 专98	1:35	1.214	51.773	Haidian
Chedaogou	车道沟*		40 85 87 114 360 424 437 450 481 604 609	1:37	1.590	53.363	Haidian
Changchun Qiao	长春桥	12	33 74 355 360 365 424 425 437 539 644 688 921	1:39	1.205	54.568	Haidian
Huoqiying	火器营		74 437 专75	1:41	0.961	55.529	Haidian
— ↓ Loop line - towards Bagou ↓ —					1.495	57.024	

== Technology ==
=== Rolling Stock ===
Line 10 utilizes a fleet of 6-car DKZ15 trains manufactured by CRRC Changchun Railway Vehicles. Initially when Phase I opened the line was operated with a fleet of only 40 trainsets (240 cars). Some sets operated on the Olympic section of Line 8 before Line 8 was extended and acquired its own dedicated rolling stock. When Line 10 Phase II opened the fleet was expanded to 84 trains. However the two existing depots serving Line 10 had insufficient capacity for the entire fleet. Therefore, only 76 trainsets could operate on the line with 8 being temporary stored in other Beijing Subway depots. With the opening of the new depot in Songjiazhuang and the need to reduce the headway on line to decrease crowding, an additional 32 trainsets were ordered. The fleet grew to 116 trainsets allowing Line 10 to operate at a headway of every 2 minutes throughout the line during rush hour. Some trains had some seats removed to increase capacity.

Model	Image	Manufacturer	Year built	Amount in service	Fleet numbers	Depot
DKZ15		CRRC Changchun Railway Vehicles; Beijing Subway Rolling Stock Equipment; CRRC Dalian	2007	43	W401–W443	Wanliu; Wulu; Songjiazhuang
DKZ34		CRRC Changchun Railway Vehicles; Beijing Subway Rolling Stock Equipment; CRRC Dalian	2011	41	10 044–10 084	Wanliu; Wulu; Songjiazhuang
DKZ46		CRRC Changchun Railway Vehicles; Beijing Subway Rolling Stock Equipment; CRRC Dalian	2013	32	10 085–10 116	Wanliu; Wulu; Songjiazhuang

=== Signaling system ===
Siemens Transportation Systems and China Railway Signaling & Communication Corp. have equipped the entire line with Siemens's Trainguard MT Communication Based Train Control (CBTC) system. As a fallback, ETCS Level 1 is also available.
