= Jingsong station =

Beijing Subway station

Jingsong 劲松
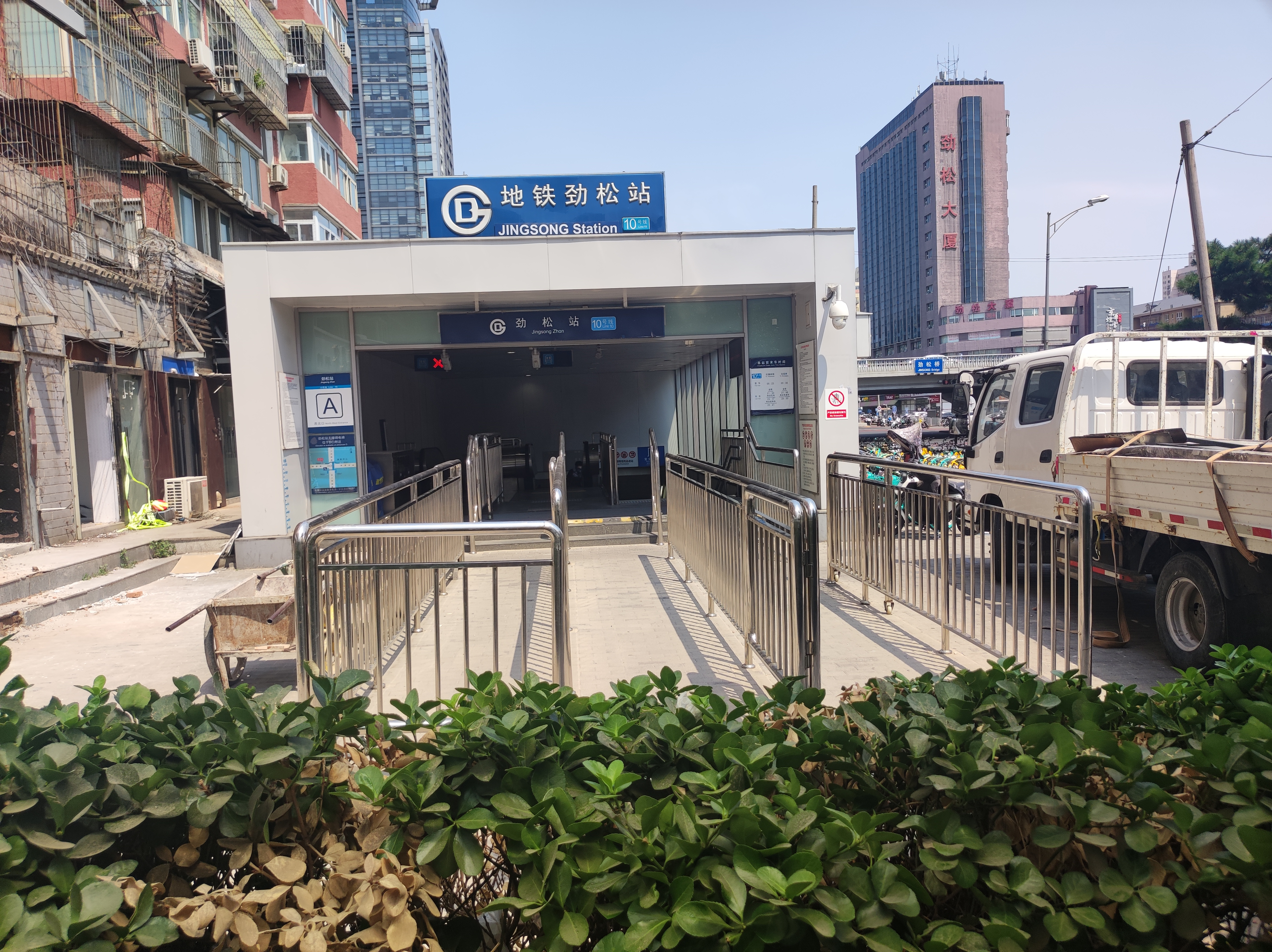
- Exit A (June 2024)

General information
- Location: East 3rd Ring Road South and Jingsong Road (劲松路) / Nanmofang Road (南磨房路); Jingsong Subdistrict, Chaoyang District, Beijing; China
- Coordinates: 39°53′04″N 116°27′41″E
- Operator: Beijing Mass Transit Railway Operation Corporation Limited
- Line: Line 10
- Platforms: 2 (1 island platform)
- Tracks: 2

Construction
- Structure type: Underground
- Accessible: Yes

History
- Opened: July 19, 2008; 18 years ago

Services
Preceding station	Beijing Subway	Following station
Shuangjing outer loop / anticlockwise	Line 10	Panjia Yuan inner loop / clockwise
Location
- Location within Beijing

Jingsong station (simplified Chinese: 劲松站; traditional Chinese: 勁松站; pinyin: Jìngsōng zhàn) is a subway station on Line 10 of the Beijing Subway. The station handled a peak entry and exit traffic of 109,700 people on May 5, 2013. It was the southeastern terminus of the line until phase two of expansion completed the Line 10 loop.

== Station layout ==
The station has an underground island platform.

== Exits ==
There are 4 exits, lettered A, B, C, and D. Exit D is accessible.

== Gallery ==
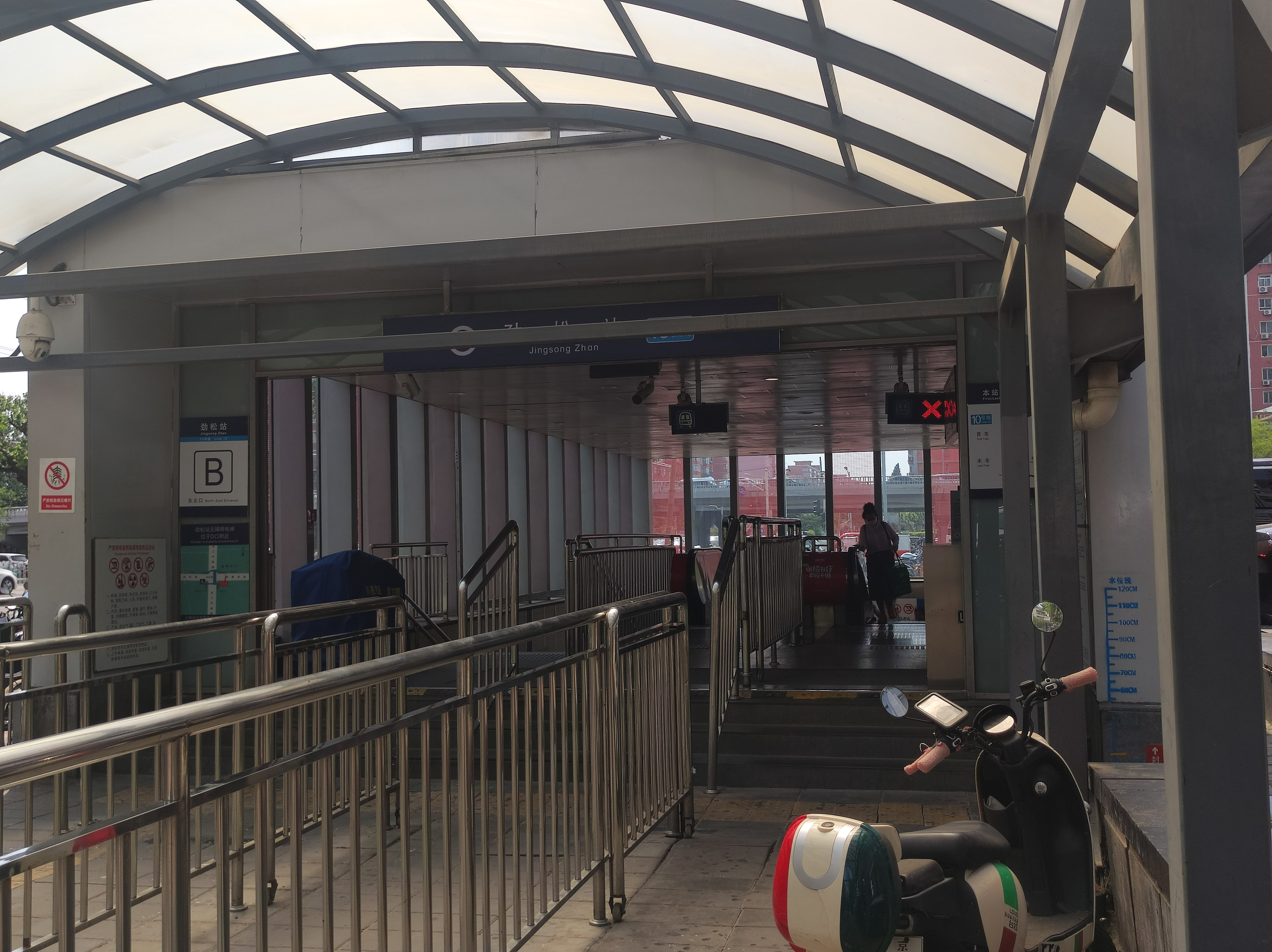
Exit B (June 2024)

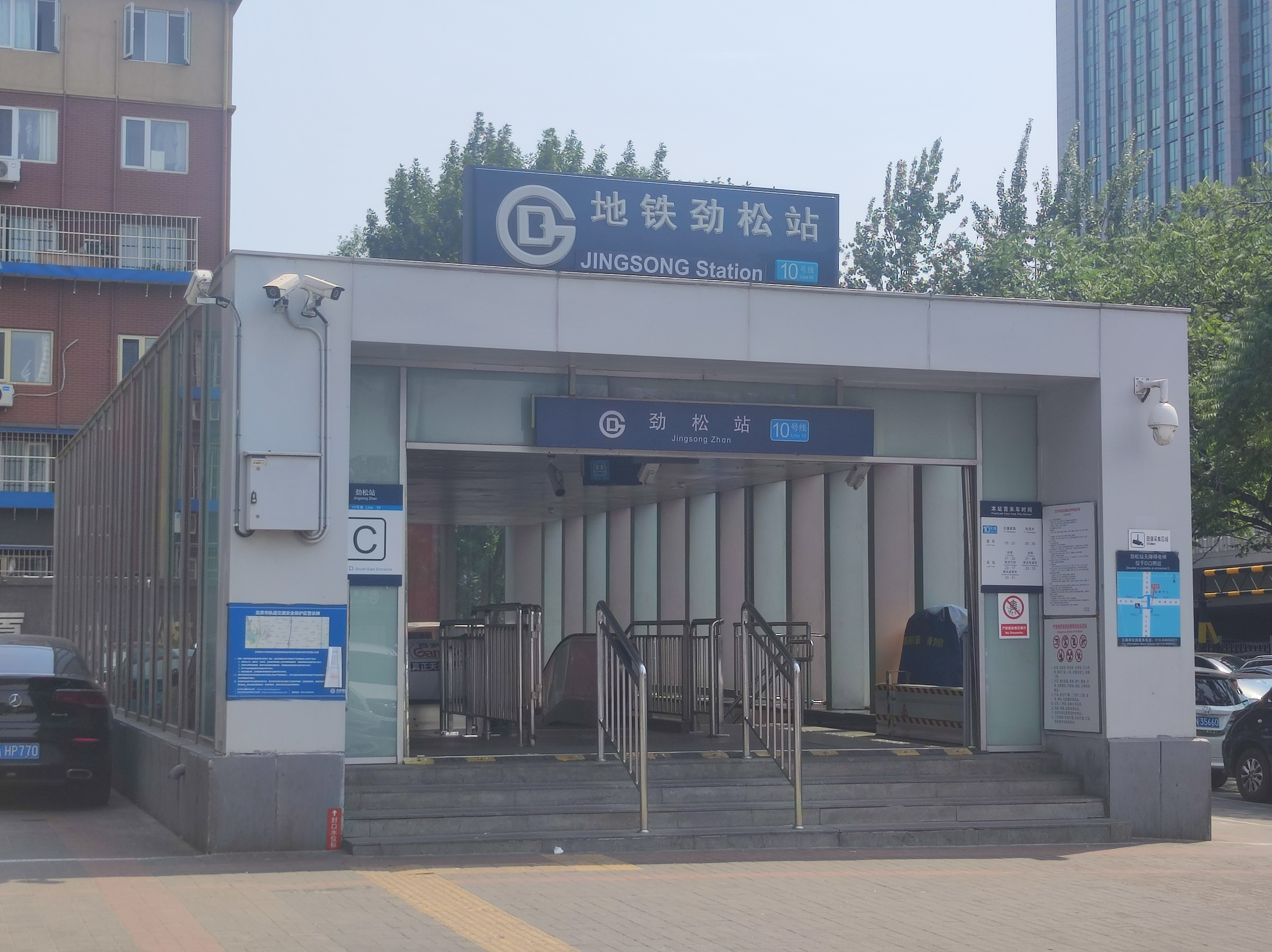
Exit C (June 2024)

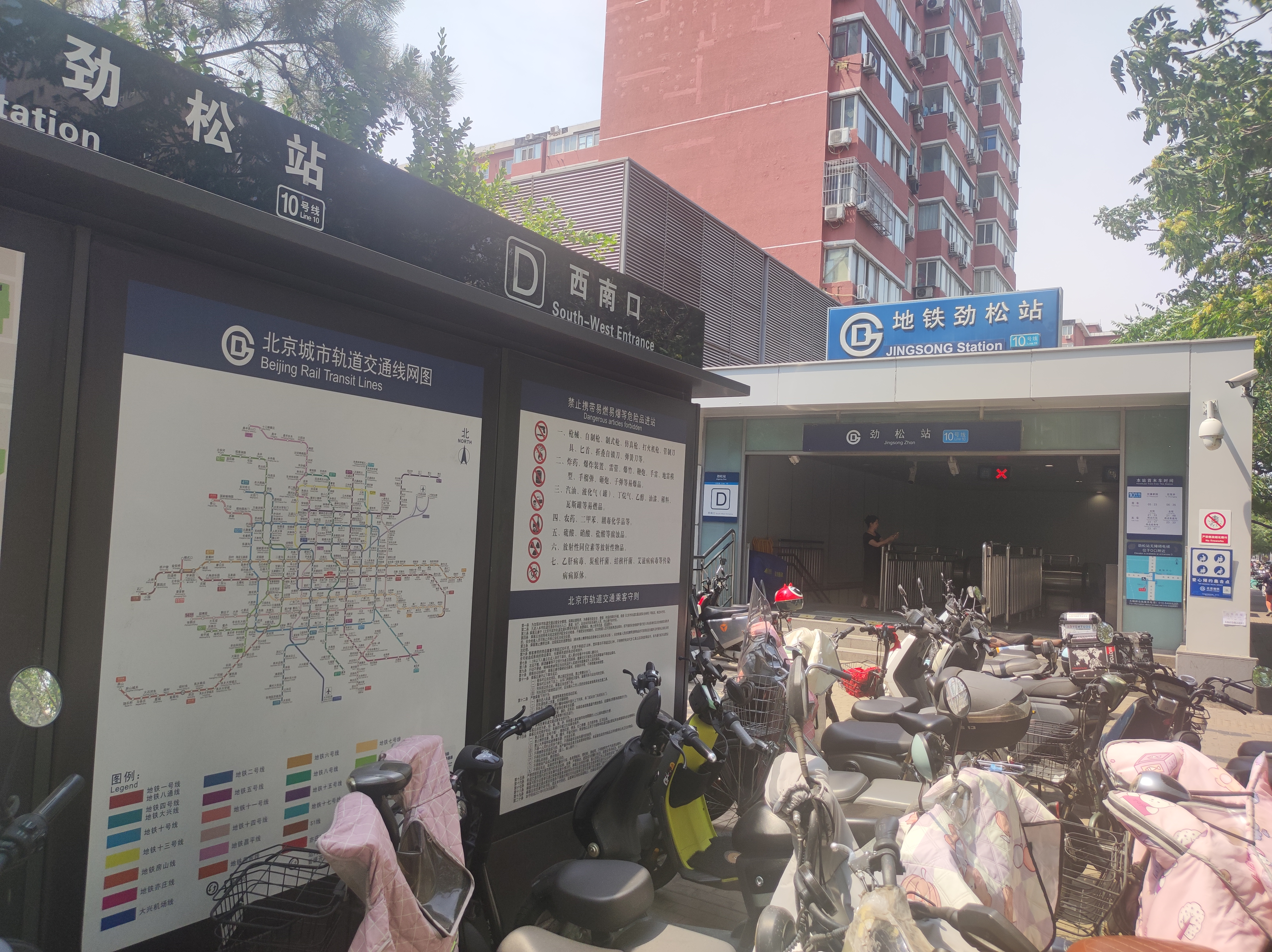
Exit D (June 2024)

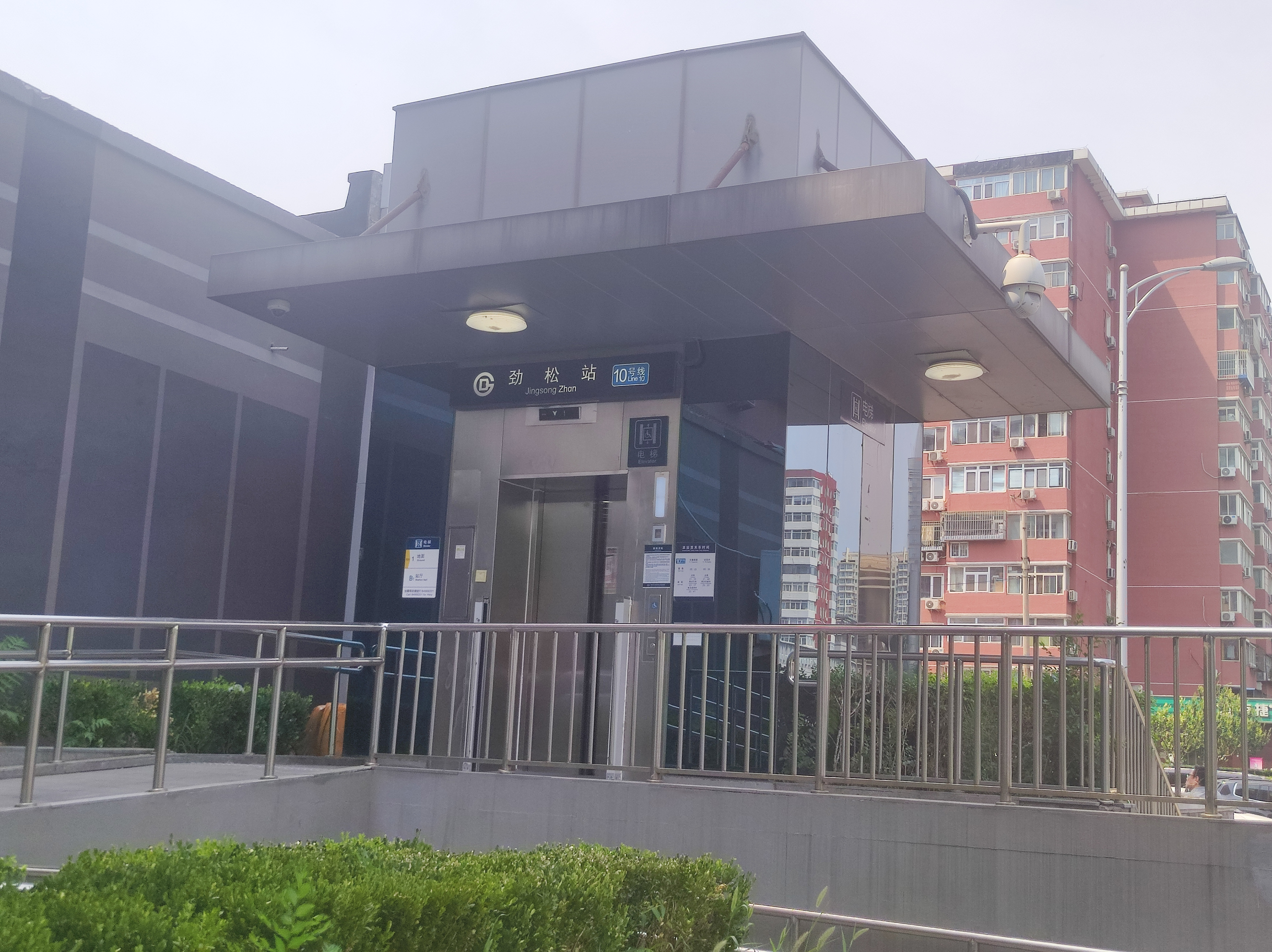
Exit D Elevator (June 2024)

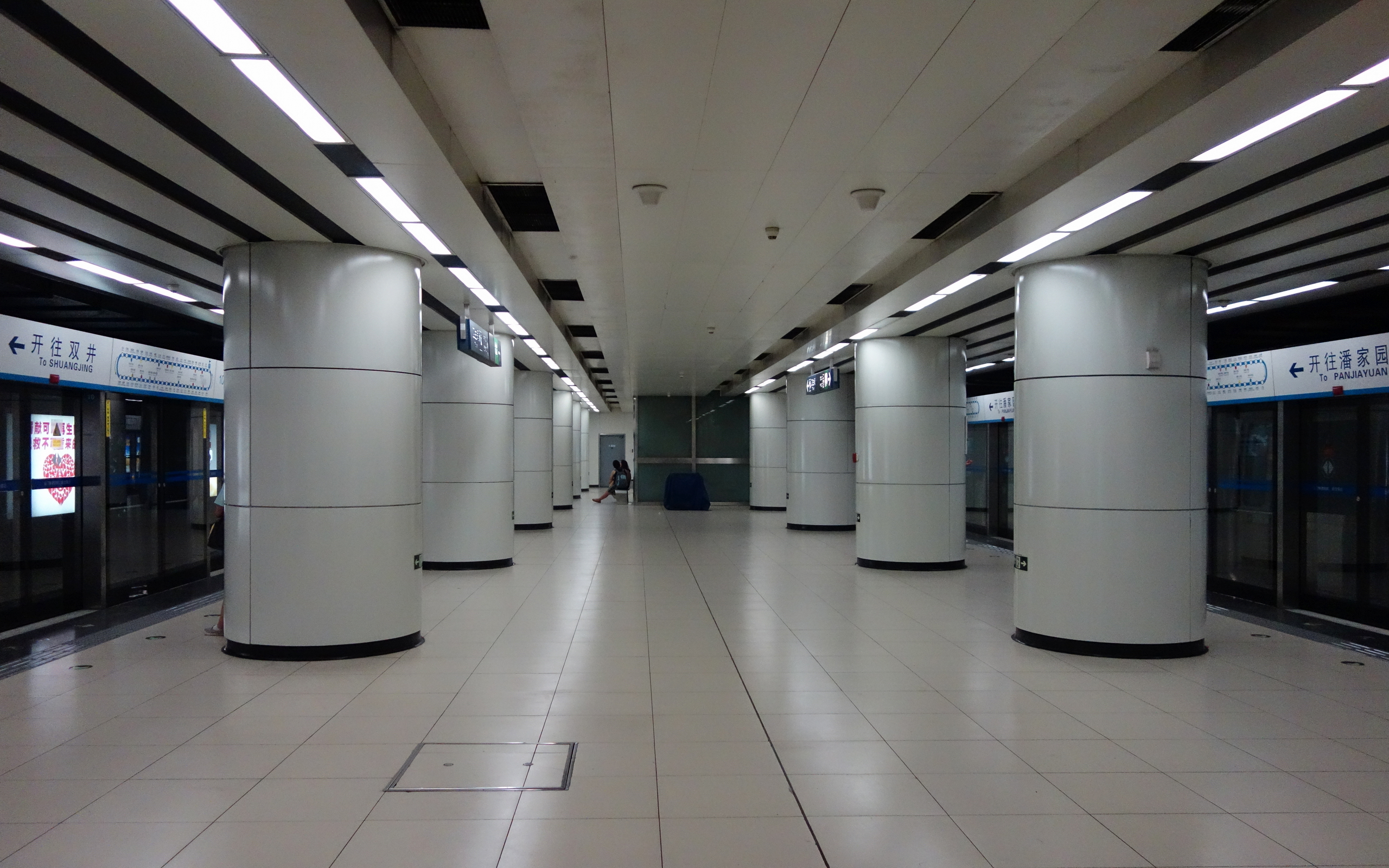
Platform (July 2013)

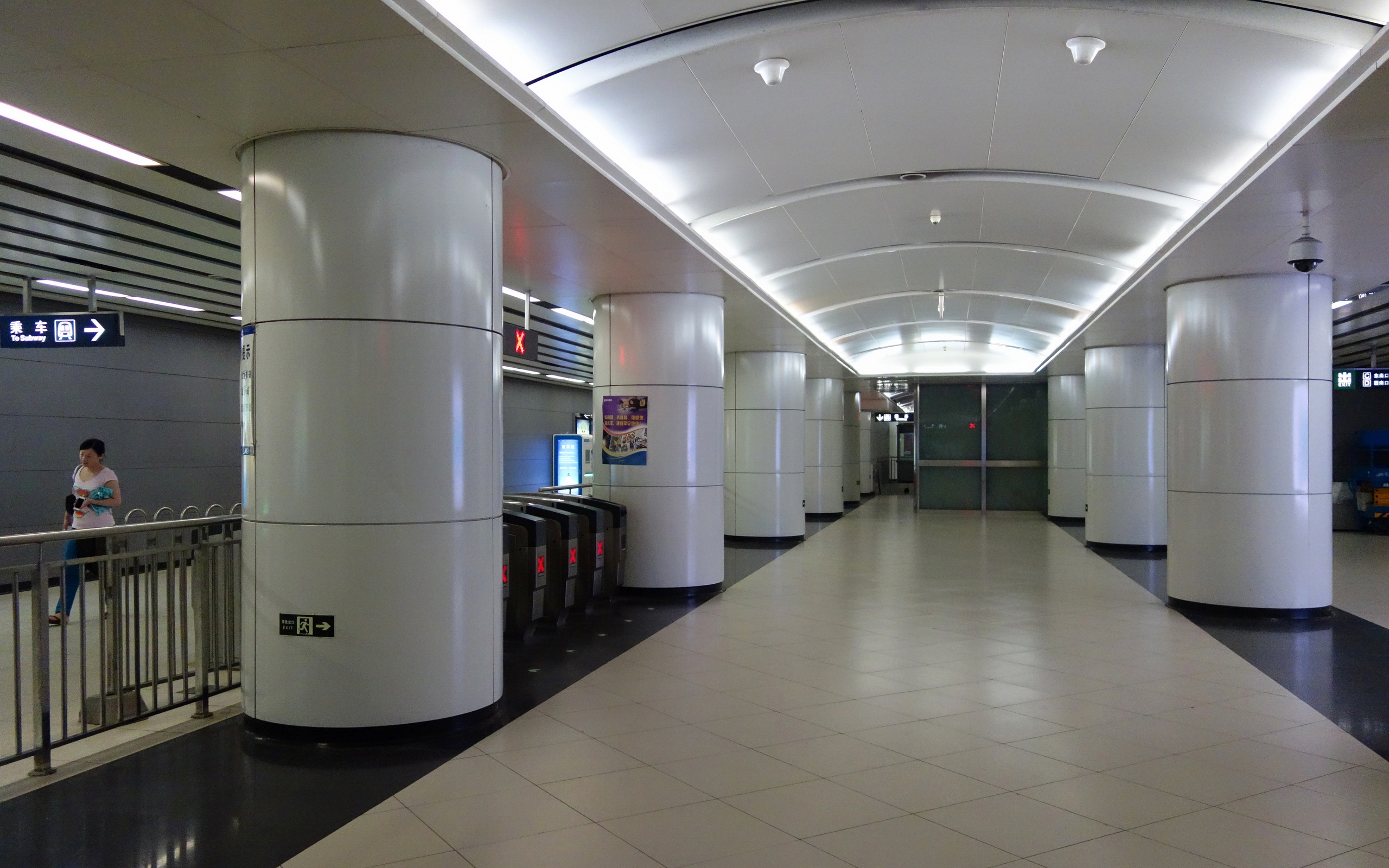
Station Hall (July 2013)
