= Niwa station =

Beijing Subway station

Niwa 泥洼
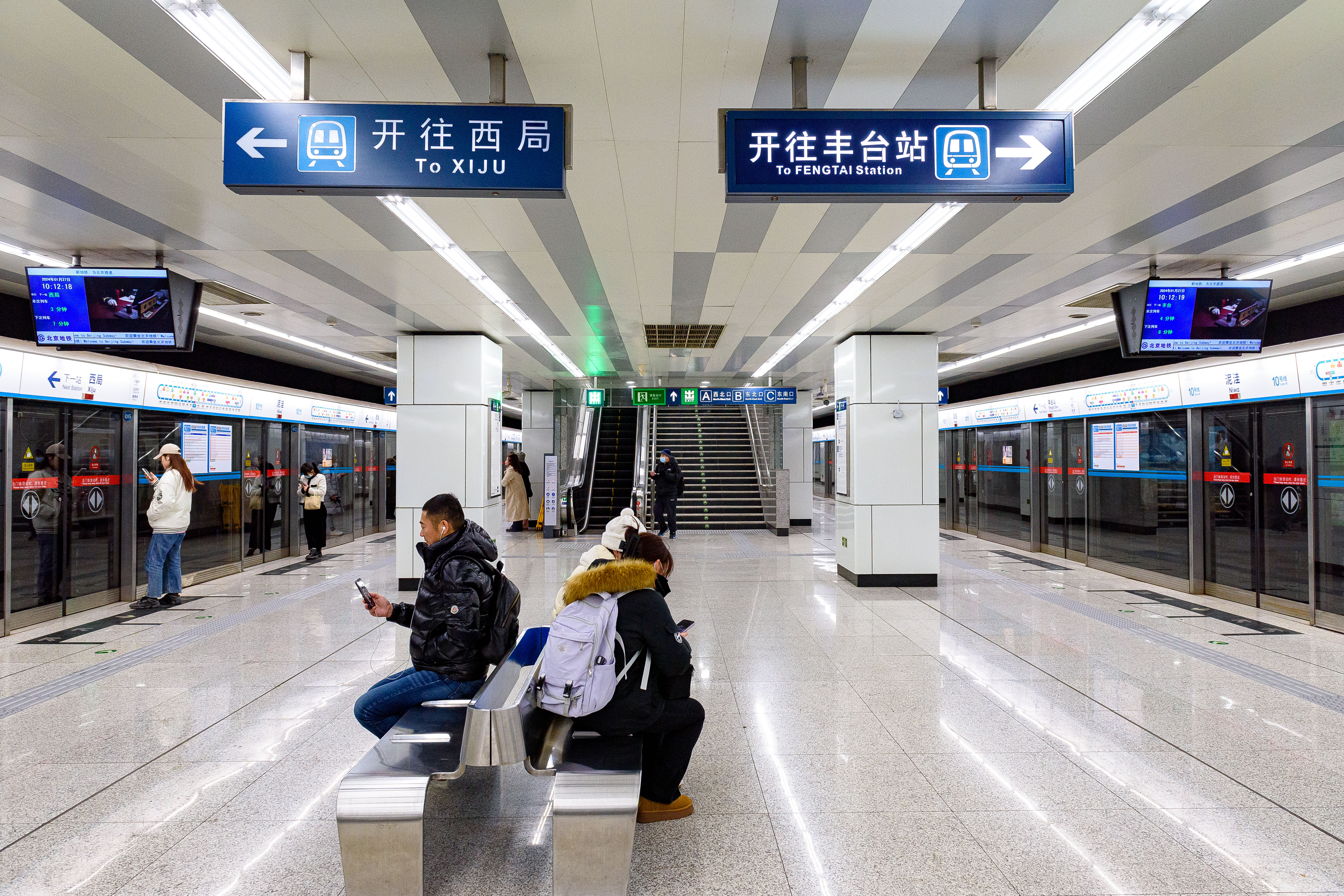
- Platform

General information
- Location: Fengguan Road (丰管路); Fengtai District, Beijing; China
- Coordinates: 39.85858°N 116.30427°E
- Operator: Beijing Mass Transit Railway Operation Corporation Limited
- Line: Line 10
- Platforms: 2 (1 island platform)
- Tracks: 2

Construction
- Structure type: Underground
- Accessible: Yes

History
- Opened: May 5, 2013

Services
Preceding station	Beijing Subway	Following station
Fengtai railway station outer loop / anticlockwise	Line 10	Xiju inner loop / clockwise
Location
- Location within Beijing

Niwa station (Chinese: 泥洼站; pinyin: Níwā zhàn) is a station on Line 10 of the Beijing Subway.

== Station layout ==
The station has an underground island platform.

== Exits ==
There are 4 exits, lettered A1, A2, B, and C1. Exits A1, A2, and C1 are accessible.
