= Liangma Qiao station =

Beijing Subway station

Liangma Qiao 亮马桥
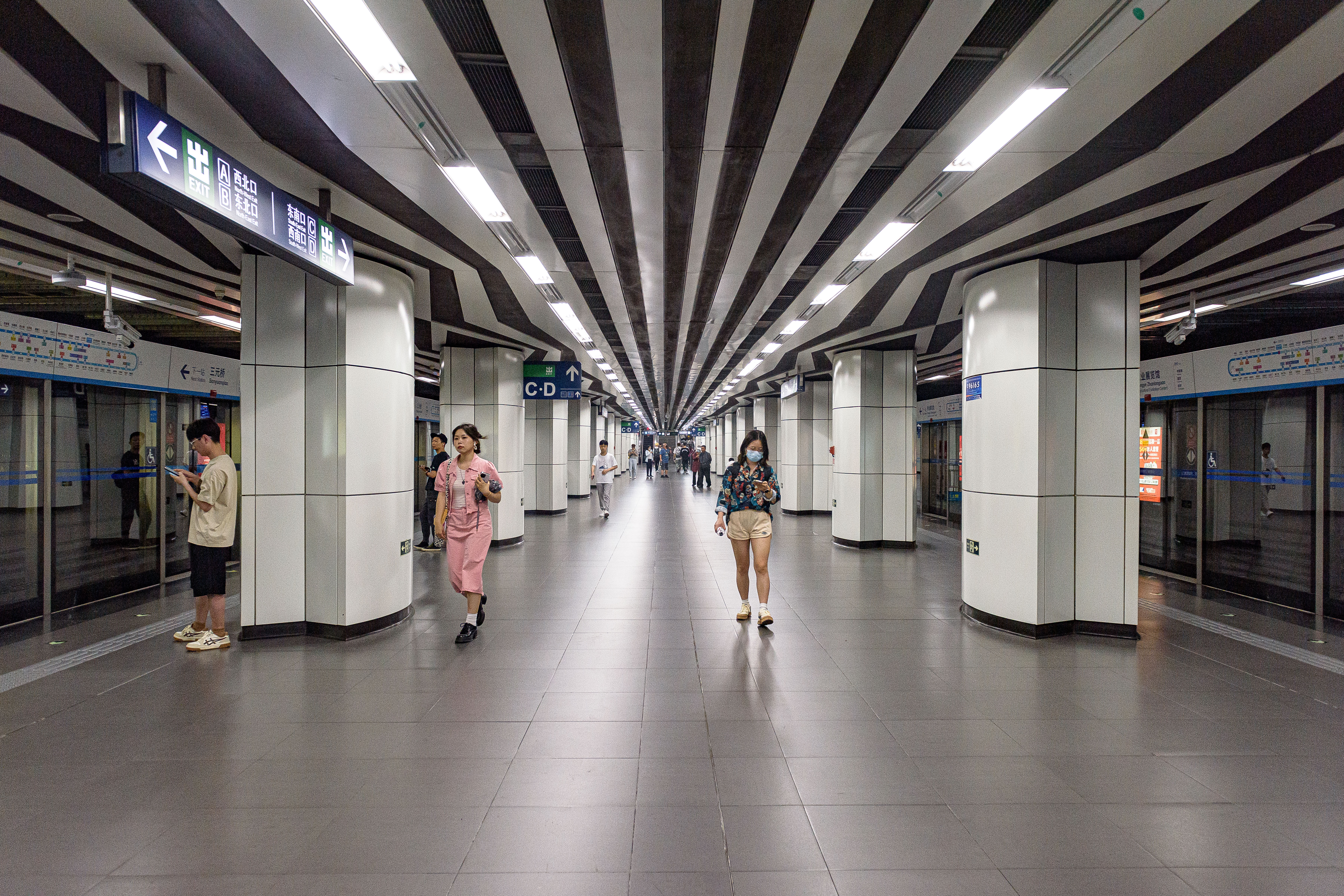
- Platform

General information
- Location: Yansha Bridge (燕莎桥), East 3rd Ring Road North and Xinyuan South Road (新源南路) / Liangmaqiao Road (亮马桥路); Chaoyang District, Beijing; China
- Coordinates: 39°56′58″N 116°27′42″E
- Operator: Beijing Mass Transit Railway Operation Corporation Limited
- Line: Line 10
- Platforms: 2 (1 island platform)
- Tracks: 2

Construction
- Structure type: Underground
- Accessible: Yes

History
- Opened: July 19, 2008; 18 years ago

Services
Preceding station	Beijing Subway	Following station
Sanyuan Qiao outer loop / anticlockwise	Line 10	Agricultural Exhibition Center inner loop / clockwise
Location
- Location within Beijing

Liangma Qiao station (simplified Chinese: 亮马桥站; traditional Chinese: 亮馬橋站; pinyin: Liàngmǎ Qiáo zhàn) is a subway station on Line 10 of the Beijing Subway. It is located near the Yansha Bridge, in Chaoyang district. It is named after the Liangmaqiao Road.

The station handled a peak entry and exit traffic of 89,800 people on May 5, 2013.

== Station layout ==
The station has an underground island platform.

== Exits ==
There are 4 exits, lettered A, B, C, and D. Exits A and B are accessible.

== Near the station ==
It is the closest subway station to many embassies and embassy housing complexes, including those of the United States, India, Israel, Japan, Germany, South Korea, Brunei and France.
