= Chedaogou station =

Beijing Subway station

Chedaogou 车道沟
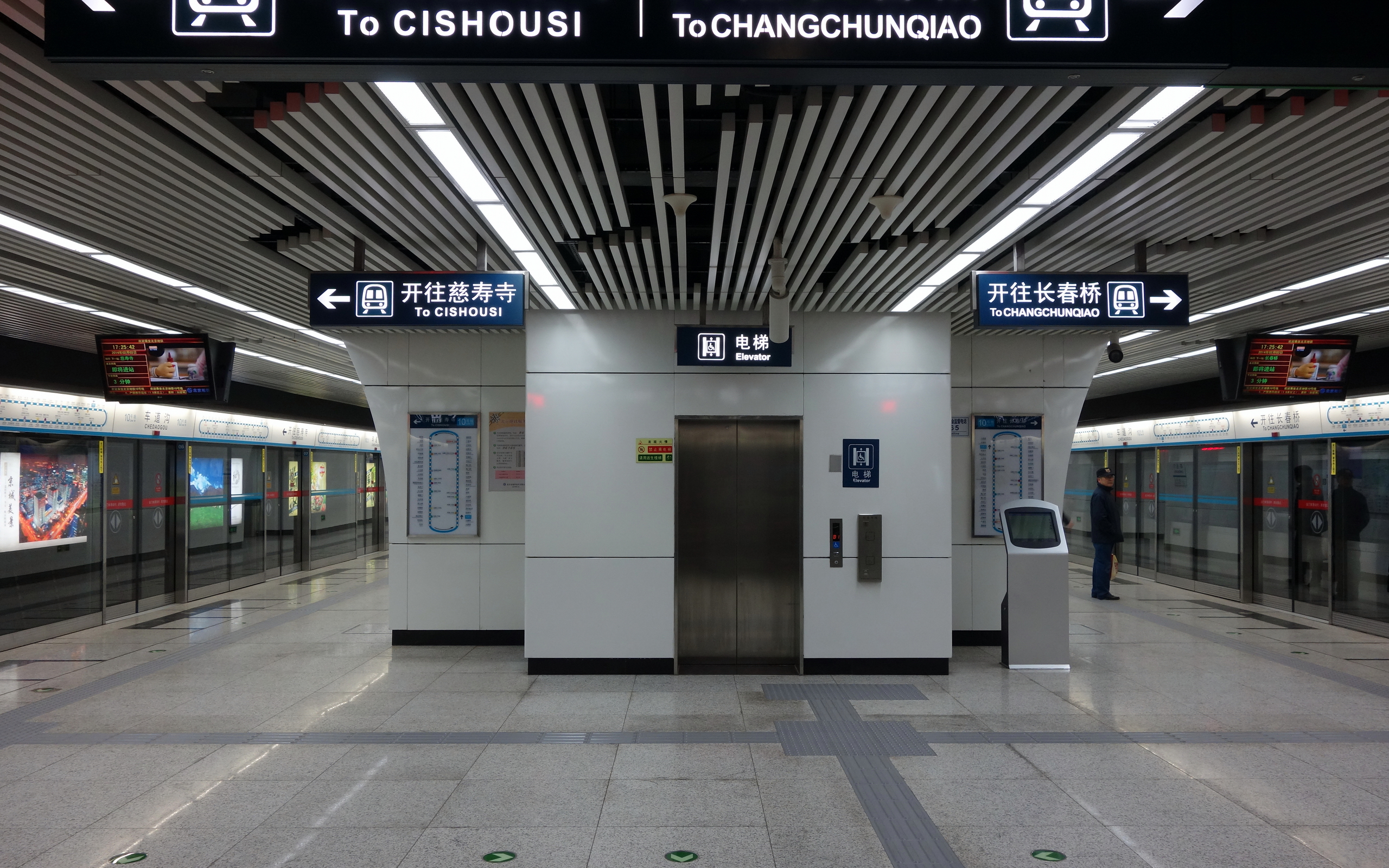
- Platform

General information
- Location: Landianchang South Road (蓝靛厂南路) and Zizhuyuan Road; Haidian District, Beijing; China
- Coordinates: 39.9479°N 116.2938°E
- Operator: Beijing Mass Transit Railway Operation Corporation Limited
- Line: Line 10
- Platforms: 2 (1 island platform)
- Tracks: 2

Construction
- Structure type: Underground
- Accessible: Yes

History
- Opened: December 30, 2012; 13 years ago

Services
Preceding station	Beijing Subway	Following station
Cishou Si outer loop / anticlockwise	Line 10	Changchun Qiao inner loop / clockwise
Location
- Location within Beijing

Chedaogou station (simplified Chinese: 车道沟站; traditional Chinese: 車道溝站; pinyin: Chēdàogōu Zhàn) is a station on Line 10 of the Beijing Subway. This station opened on December 30, 2012.

== Station layout ==
The station has an underground island platform.

== Exits ==
There are 4 exits, lettered A, B, C, and D. Exits A and D are accessible.

== Gallery ==
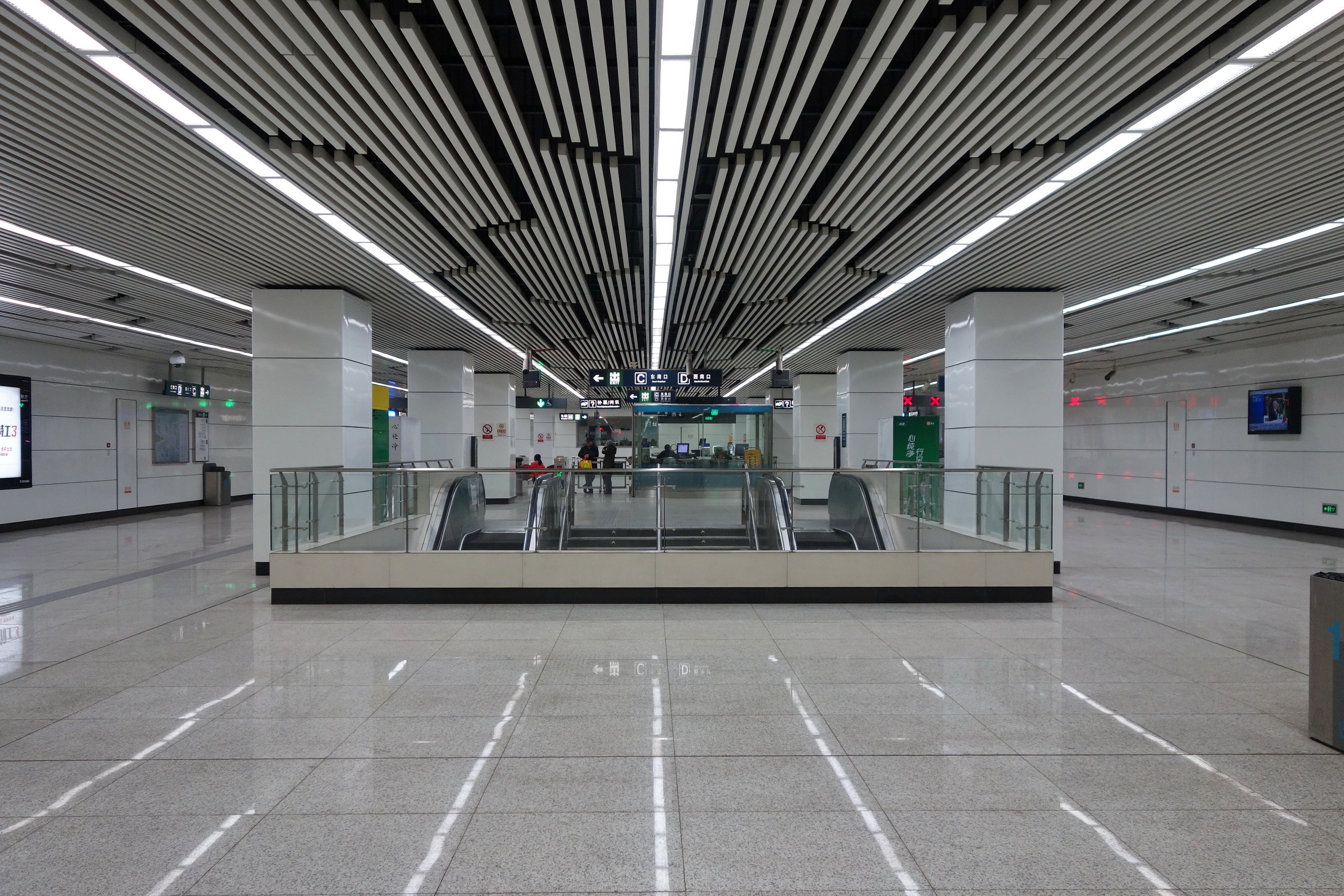
Concourse of Chedaogou Station

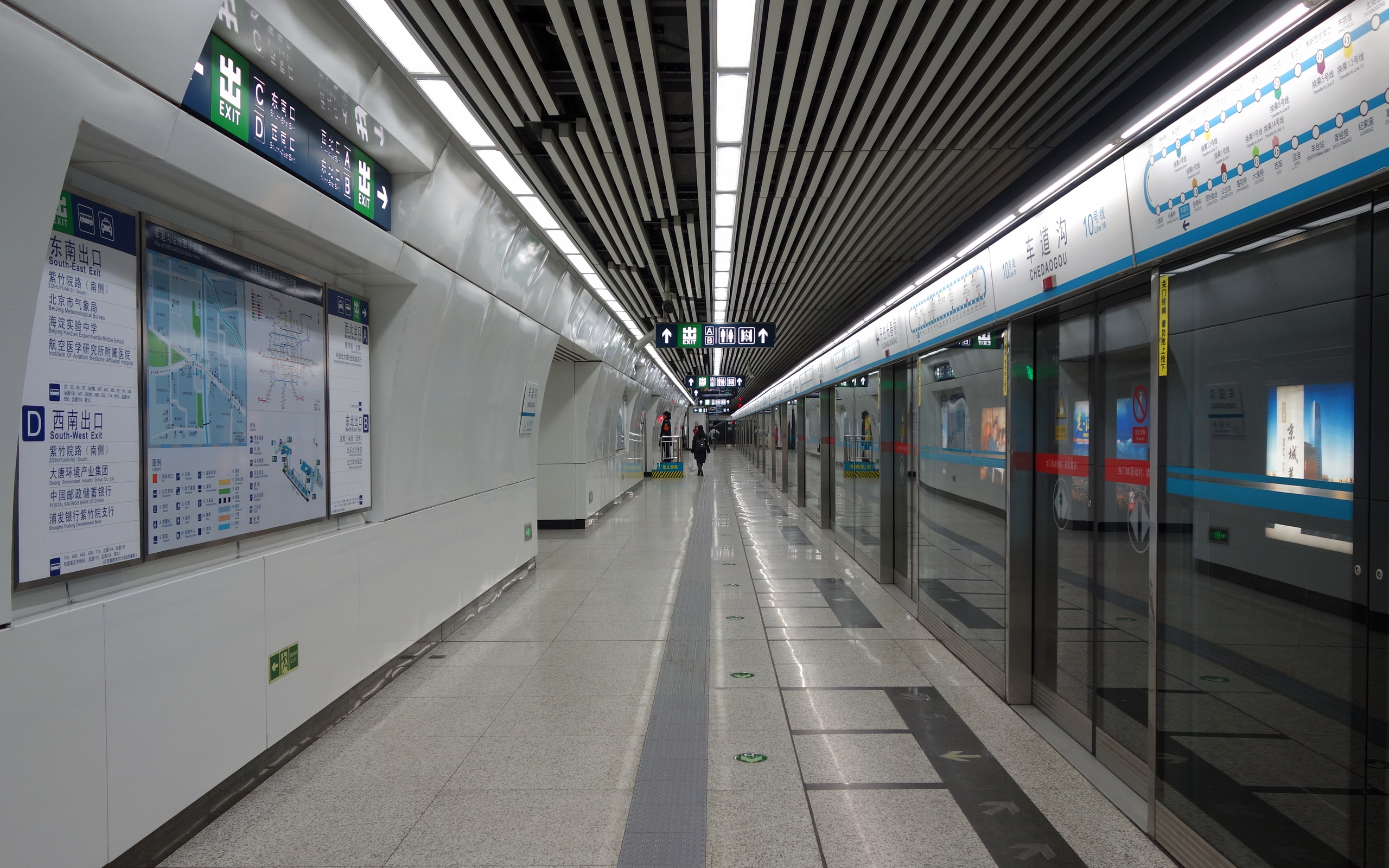
Station Platform

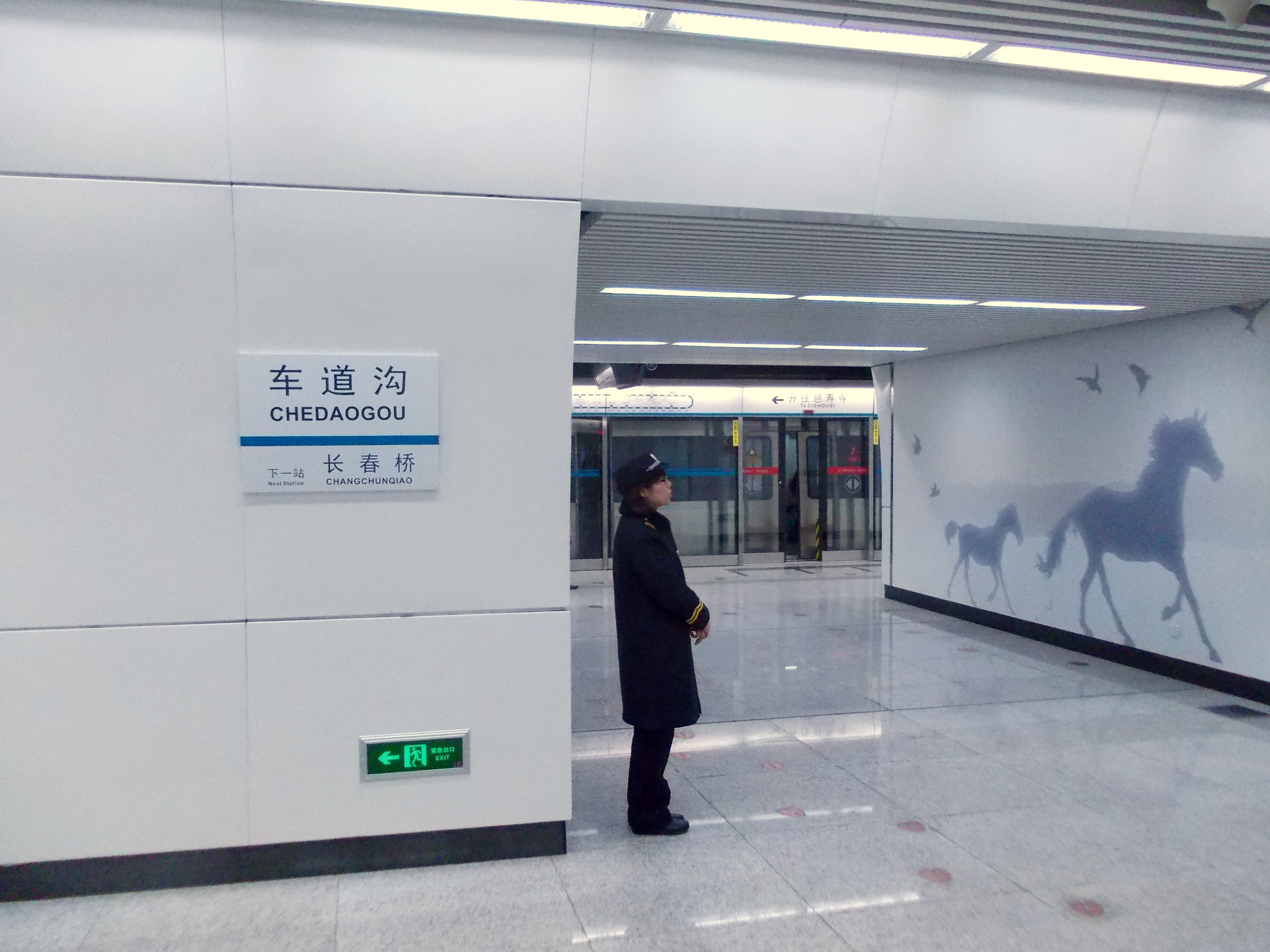
Station Platform
