= Dahong Men station =

Beijing Subway station

Dahong Men 大红门
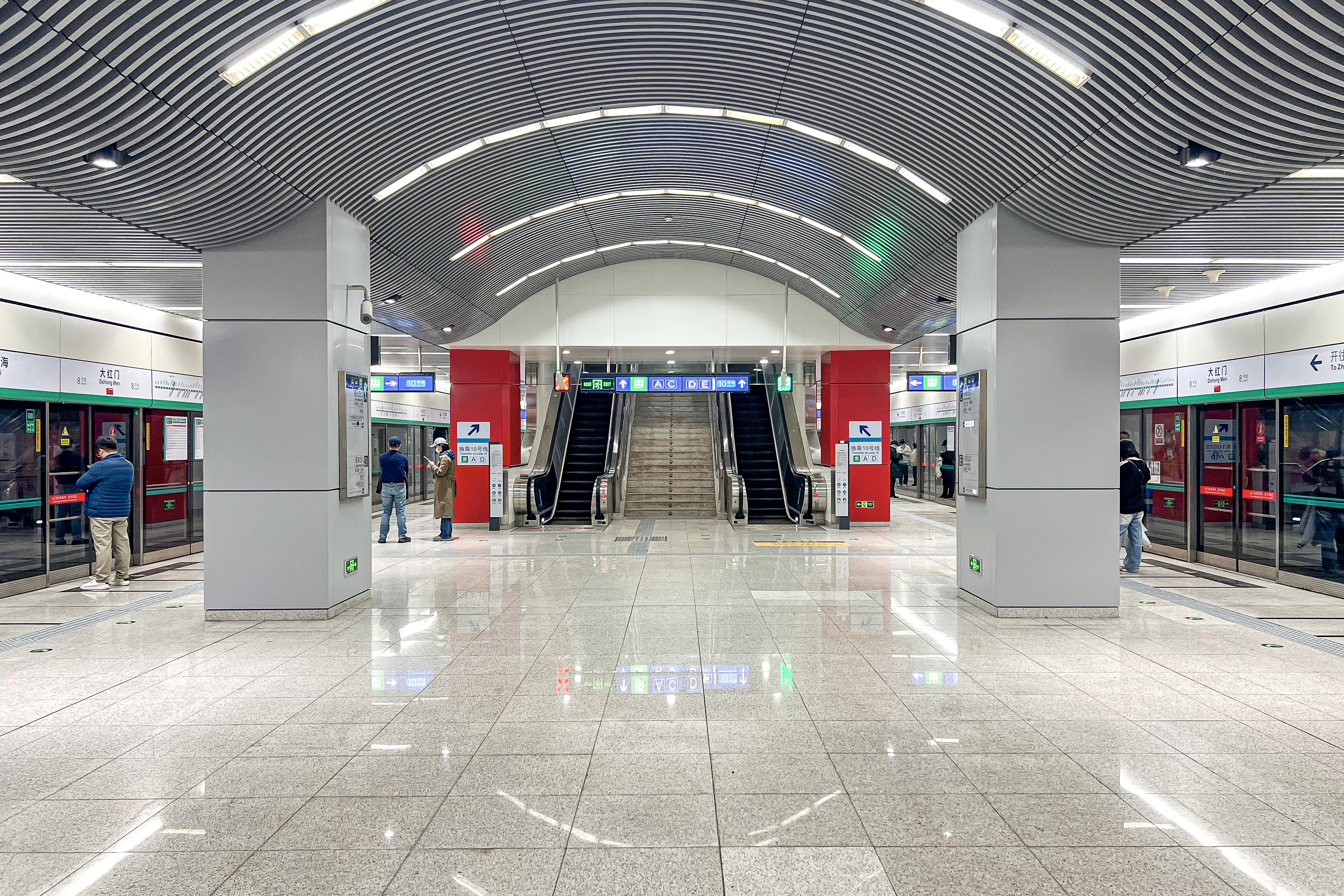
- Line 8 platform

General information
- Location: Nanyuan Road and Linhong Road (临泓路); Fengtai District, Beijing; China
- Coordinates: 39°50′43″N 116°23′57″E
- Operator: Beijing Mass Transit Railway Operation Corporation Limited
- Lines: Line 8 Line 10
- Platforms: 4 (2 island platforms)
- Tracks: 4

Construction
- Structure type: Underground
- Accessible: Yes

History
- Opened: Line 10: December 30, 2012; 13 years ago; Line 8: November 8, 2025; 9 months ago

Services
Preceding station	Beijing Subway	Following station
Haihutun towards Zhuxinzhuang	Line 8	Dahongmennan towards Yinghai
Shiliuzhuang outer loop / anticlockwise	Line 10	Jiaomendong inner loop / clockwise
Location
- Location within Beijing

Dahong Men station (simplified Chinese: 大红门站; traditional Chinese: 大紅門站; pinyin: Dàhóng Mén zhàn) is an interchange station between Line 8 and Line 10 of the Beijing Subway.

The Line 10 station opened on December 30, 2012.

The Line 8 station opened on November 8, 2025. Only one new exit (Exit E of Line 8) opened, and Exit F of Line 8 will be a reserved exit in long-term plan.

== Station layout ==
The Line 8 and Line 10 stations both have underground island platforms.

== Exits ==
There are 5 exits, lettered A1, A2, C, D and E. Exits A1, C and D are accessible.

== Gallery ==
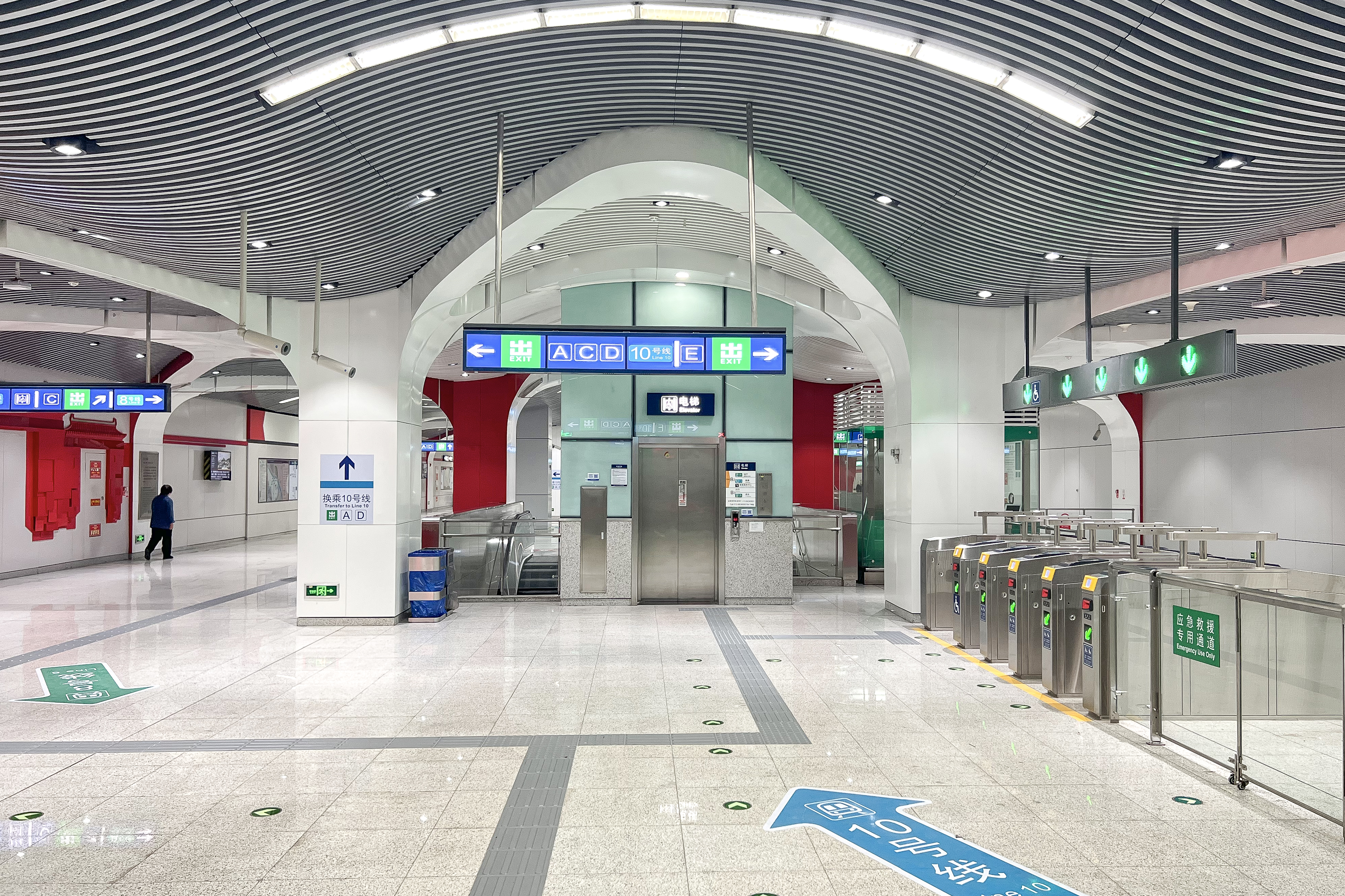
Line 8 concourse

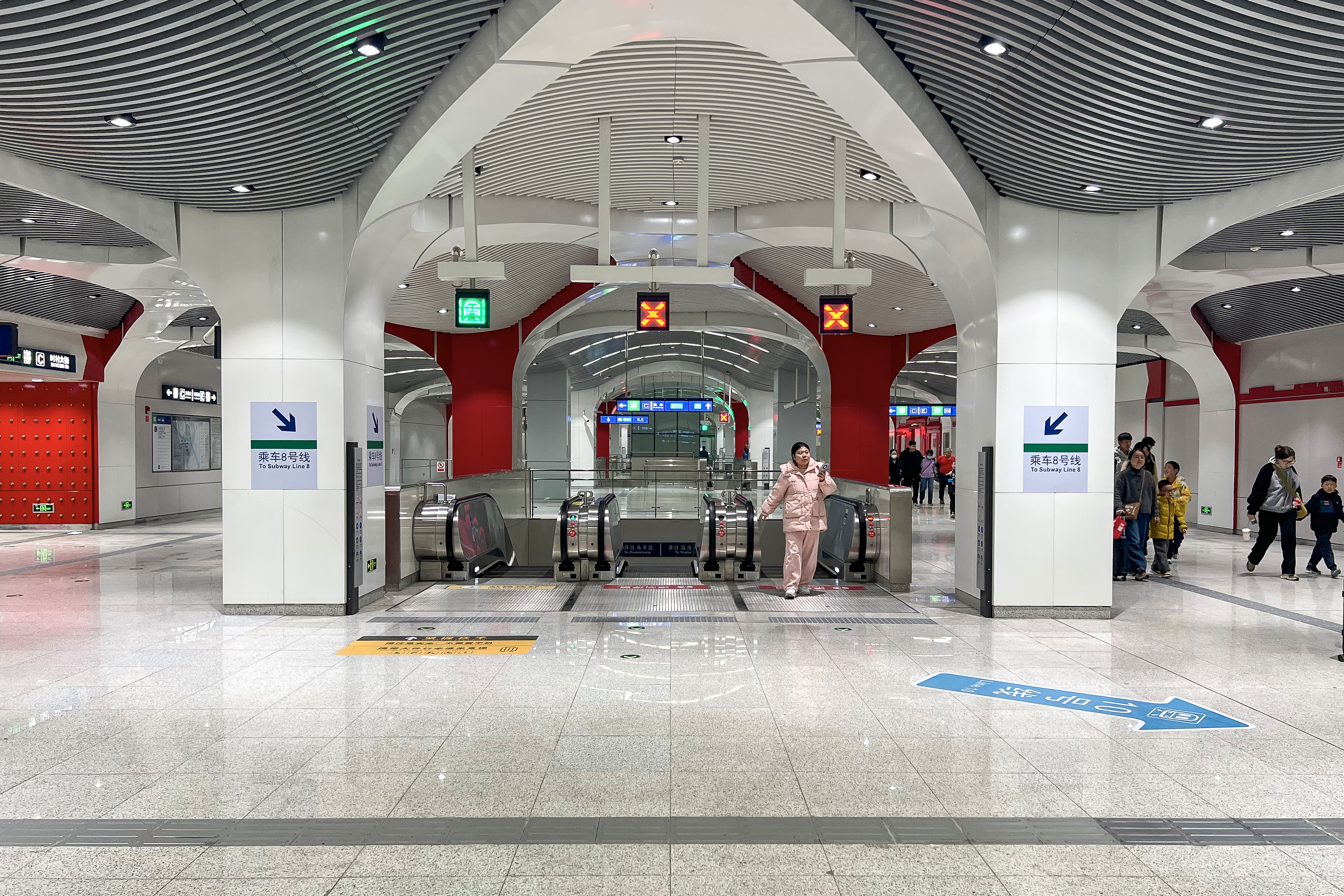
Line 8 concourse (alternate view)

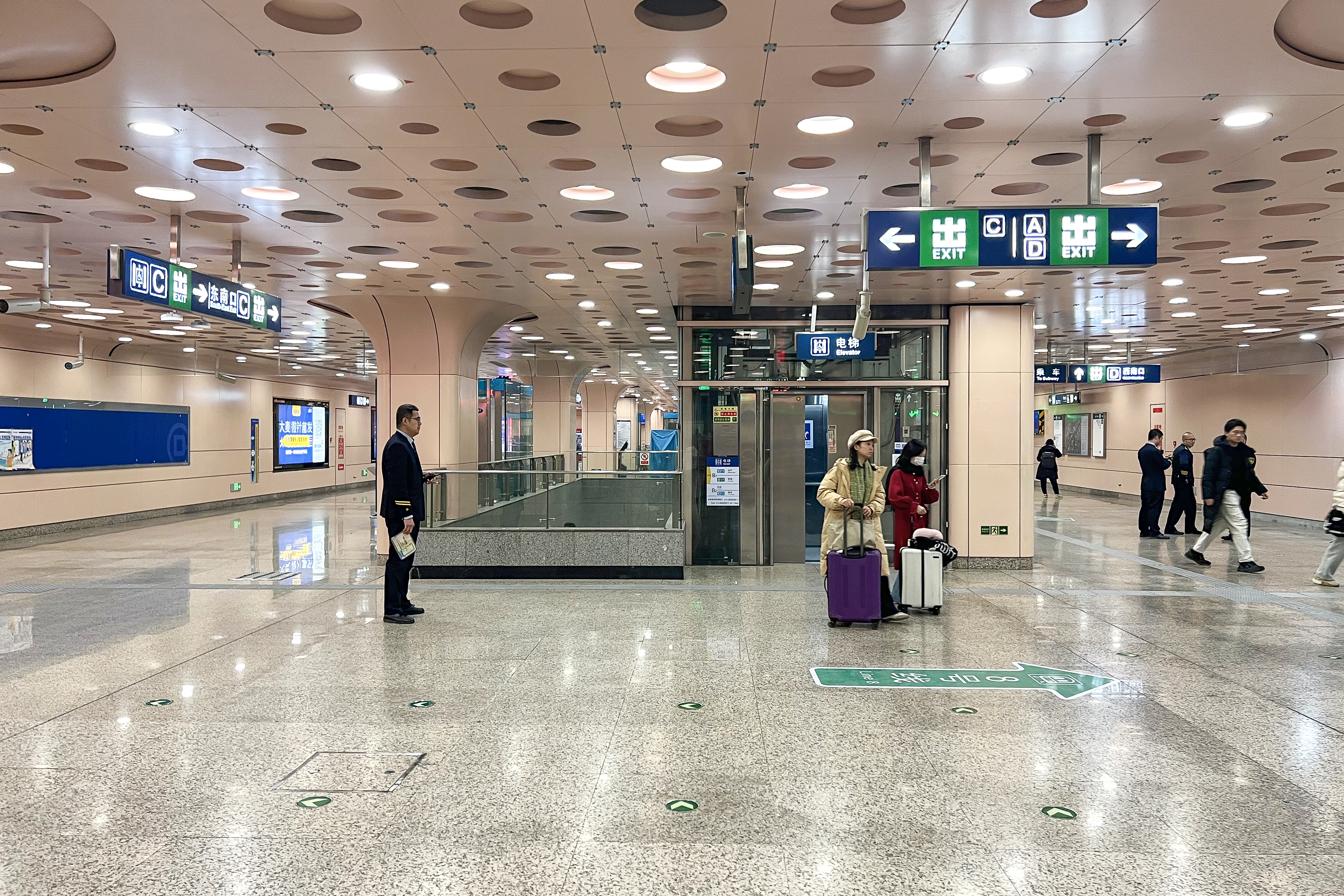
Line 10 concourse

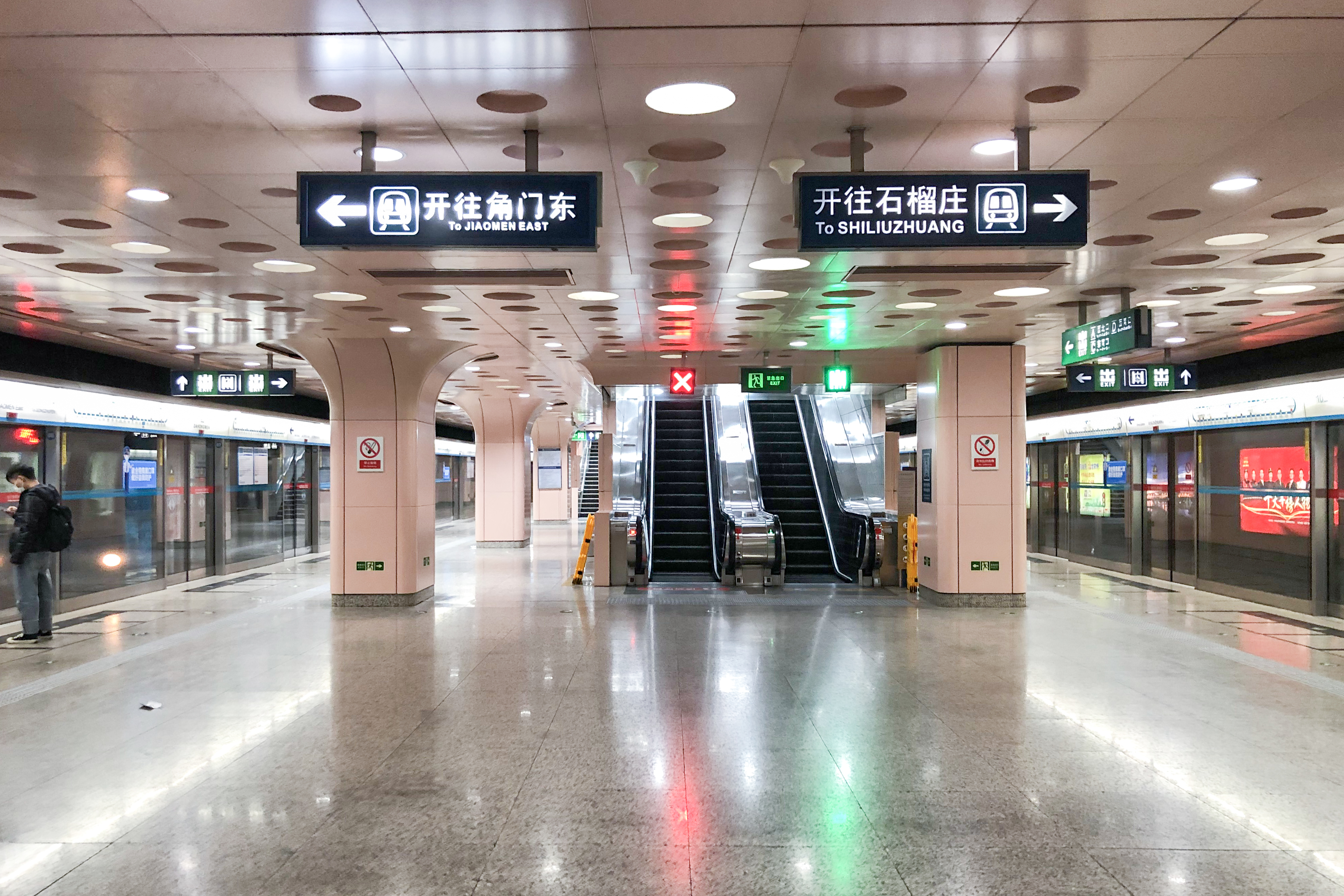
Line 10 platform

== History ==
When the southern section of Line 8 was opened in 2018, this station was unable to open due to obstruction of the demolition of Buildings 1 and 2 of Miaopu Xili (a resident area) within the block where the transfer passageway is located (as there were still 21 households that have not signed a contract for relocation). In July 2021, the demolition of Building 1 of Miaopu Xili began, but the demolished plot was vacant until December 2023. At the start of February 2024, construction of the transfer passageway began. Dahong Men station of Line 8 (including Exit E) opened on November 8, 2025.
