= Panjiayuan station =

Beijing Subway station

Panjia Yuan 潘家园
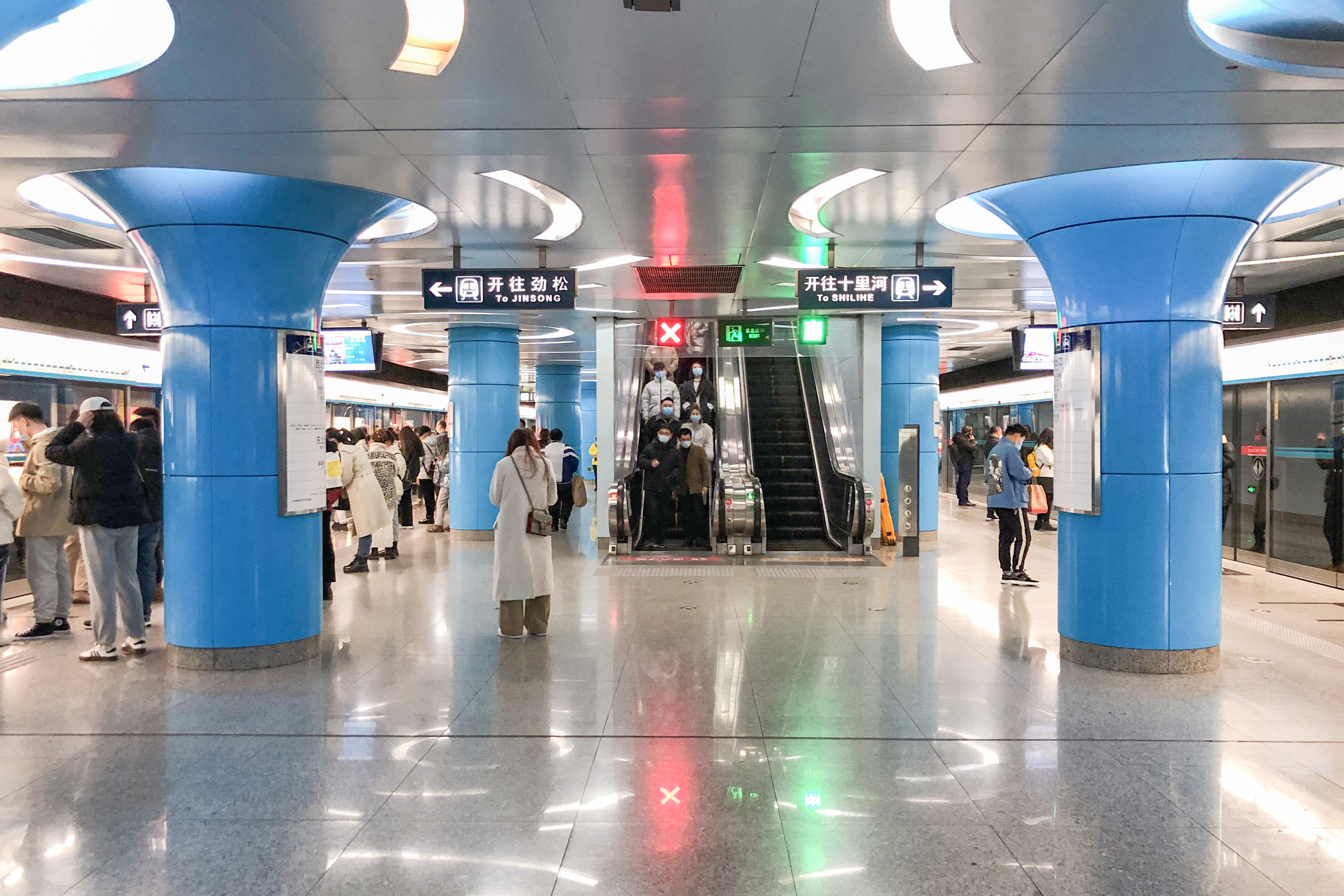
- Platform

General information
- Location: East 3rd Ring Road South and Panjiayuan Road (潘家园路) / Songyu North Road (松榆北路); Panjiayuan Subdistrict, Chaoyang District, Beijing; China
- Coordinates: 39°52′31″N 116°27′39″E
- Operator: Beijing Mass Transit Railway Operation Corporation Limited
- Line: Line 10
- Platforms: 2 (1 island platform)
- Tracks: 2

Construction
- Structure type: Underground
- Accessible: Yes

History
- Opened: December 30, 2012; 13 years ago

Services
Preceding station	Beijing Subway	Following station
Jingsong outer loop / anticlockwise	Line 10	Shilihe inner loop / clockwise
Location
- Location within Beijing

Panjia Yuan station (simplified Chinese: 潘家园站; traditional Chinese: 潘家園站; pinyin: Pānjiā Yuán zhàn) is a station on Line 10 of the Beijing Subway. This station opened on December 30, 2012. It is located in Panjiayuan Subdistrict, Chaoyang District.

== Station layout ==
The station has an underground island platform.

== Exits ==
There are 4 exits, lettered A, B, C1, and C2. Exits A and C2 are accessible.

== Gallery ==
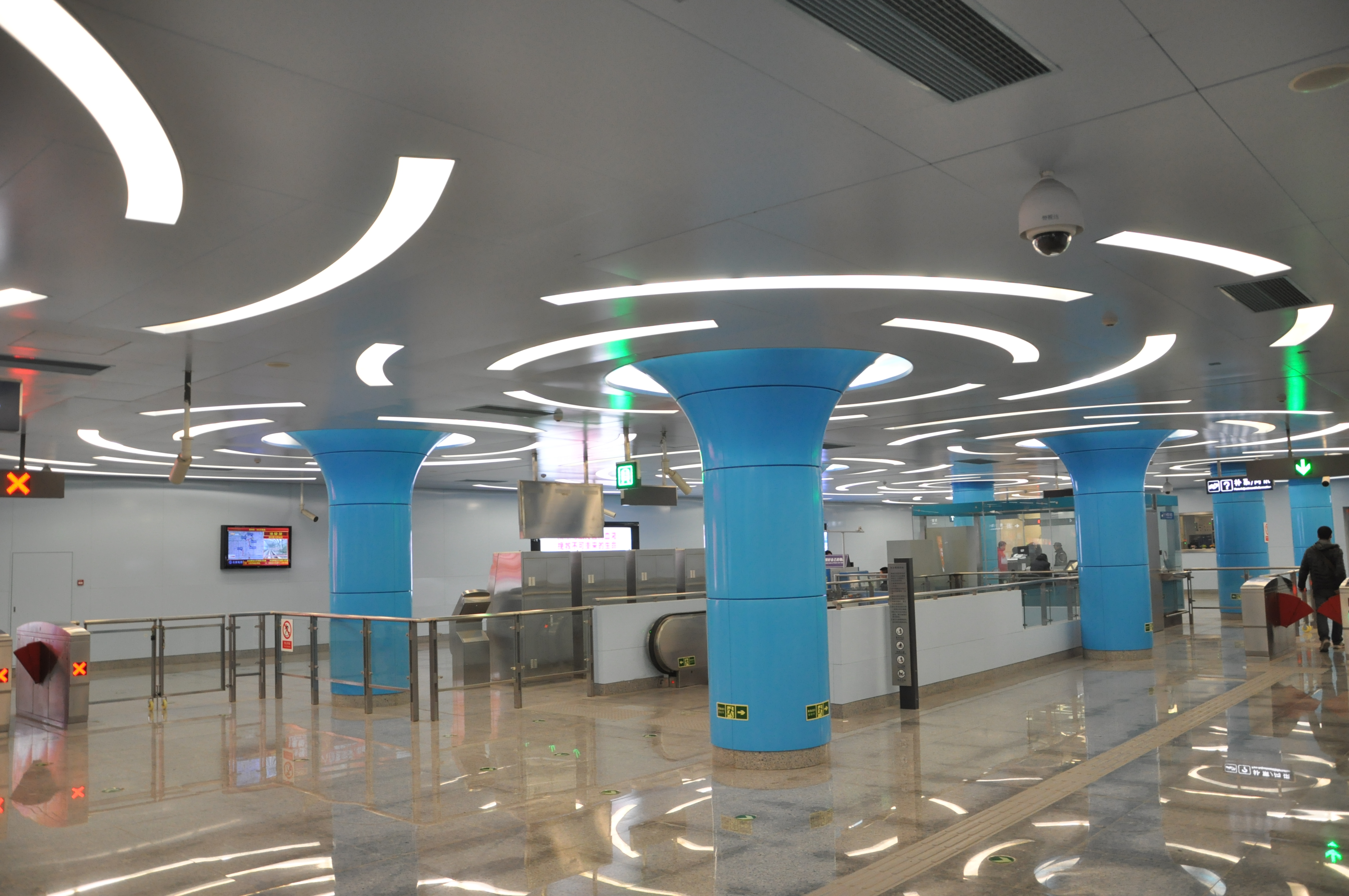
Station Hall
