= Jiaomendong station =

Beijing Subway station

Jiaomendong 角门东
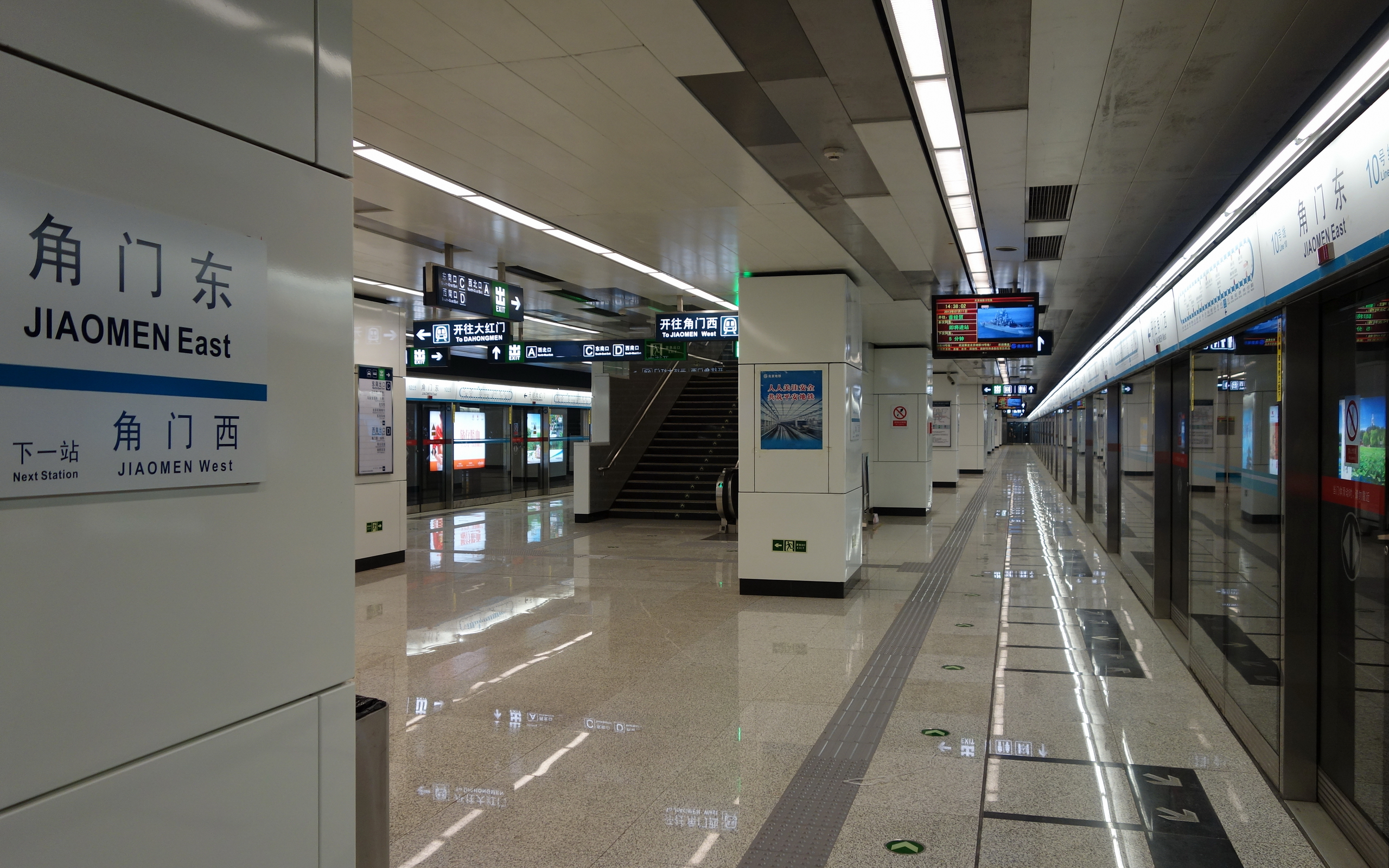
- Platform

General information
- Location: Jiaomen Road (角门路) / Linhong Road (临泓路) and Majiapu East Road (马家堡东路); Fengtai District, Beijing; China
- Coordinates: 39°50′42″N 116°23′08″E
- Operator: Beijing Mass Transit Railway Operation Corporation Limited
- Line: Line 10
- Platforms: 2 (1 island platform)
- Tracks: 2

Construction
- Structure type: Underground
- Accessible: Yes

History
- Opened: May 5, 2013; 13 years ago

Services
Preceding station	Beijing Subway	Following station
Dahong Men outer loop / anticlockwise	Line 10	Jiaomenxi inner loop / clockwise
Location
- Location within Beijing

Jiaomendong station (simplified Chinese: 角门东站; traditional Chinese: 角門東站; pinyin: Jiǎomén Dōng Zhàn) is a station on Line 10 of the Beijing Subway. The phase II of Line 10 entered in operation on December 30, 2012. However, this station did not open on that day, and Line 10 skipped this station. The station opened on 5 May 2013.

== Station layout ==
The station has an underground island platform.

== Exits ==
There are 5 exits, lettered A, B, C, D1, and D2. Exit C is accessible.
