= Shichahai station =

Beijing Subway station

Coordinates: 39.9376°N 116.3962°E

Shichahai 什刹海
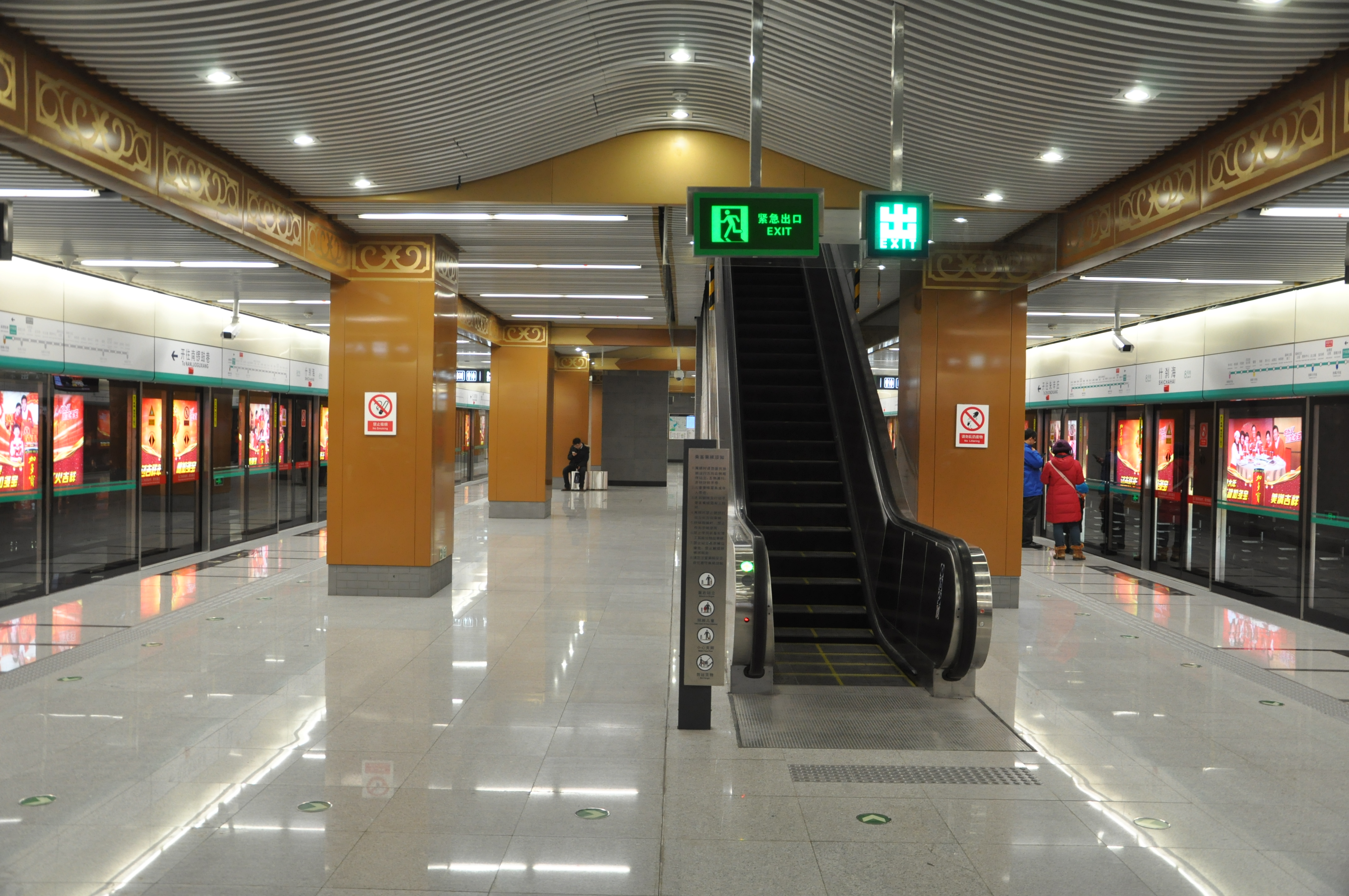
- Platform

General information
- Location: Di'anmen Outer Street; Xicheng District / Dongcheng District border, Beijing; China
- Operator: Beijing Mass Transit Railway Operation Corporation Limited
- Line: Line 8
- Platforms: 2 (1 island platform)
- Tracks: 2

Construction
- Structure type: Underground
- Accessible: Yes

History
- Opened: December 28, 2013

Services
Preceding station	Beijing Subway	Following station
Gulou Dajie towards Zhuxinzhuang	Line 8	Nanluogu Xiang towards Yinghai
Location
- Location within Beijing

Shichahai (simplified Chinese: 什刹海站; traditional Chinese: 什剎海站; pinyin: Shíchàhǎi Zhàn) is a station on Line 8 of the Beijing Subway. The station opened on December 28, 2013.

The station is named after Shichahai, a scenic area in Beijing.

== Station layout ==
The station has an underground island platform.

== Exits ==
There are 3 exits, lettered A1, A2, and C. Exit C is accessible.

== Gallery ==
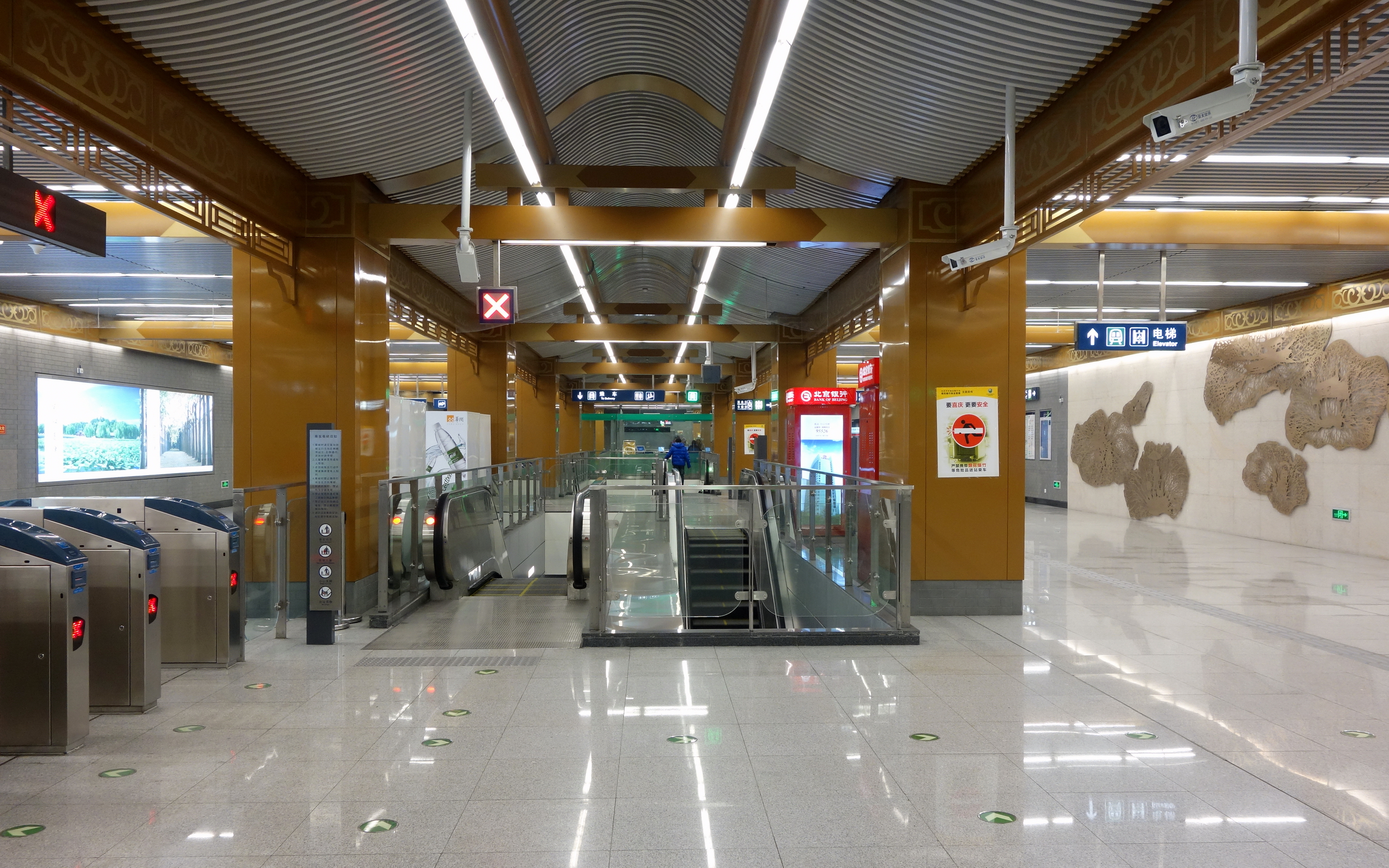

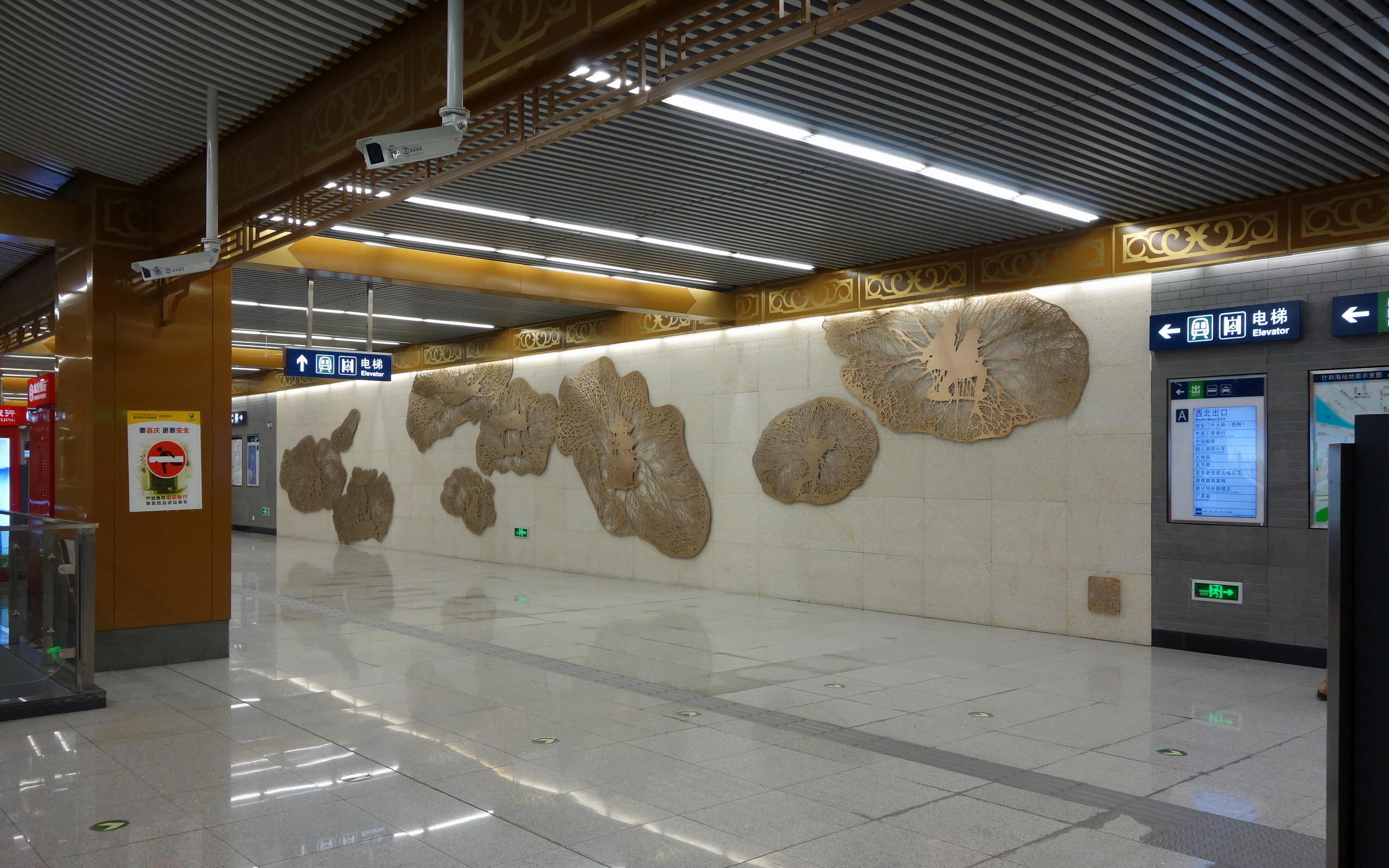

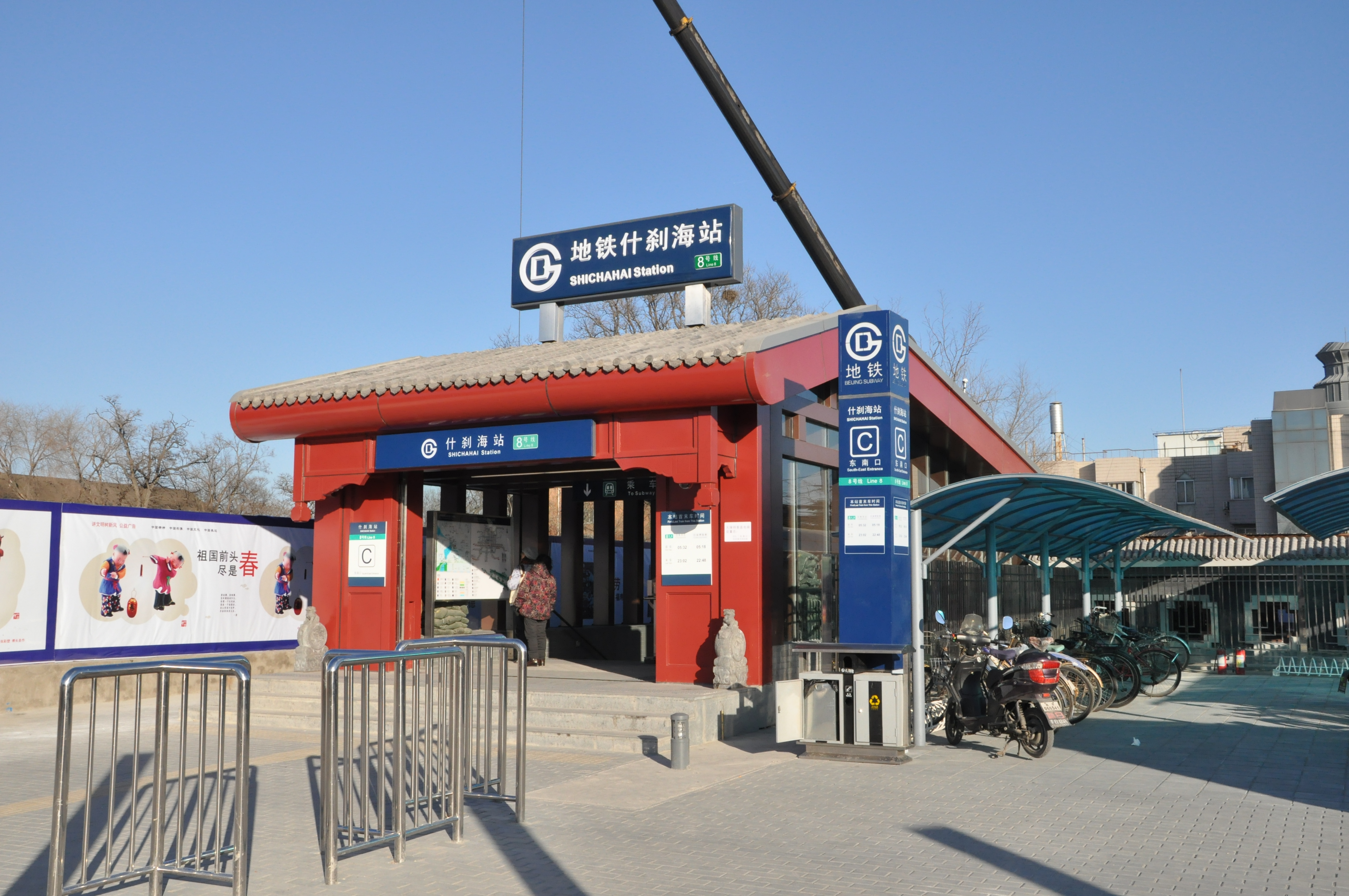
