= Jinyu Hutong station =

Beijing Subway station

Jinyu Hutong 金鱼胡同
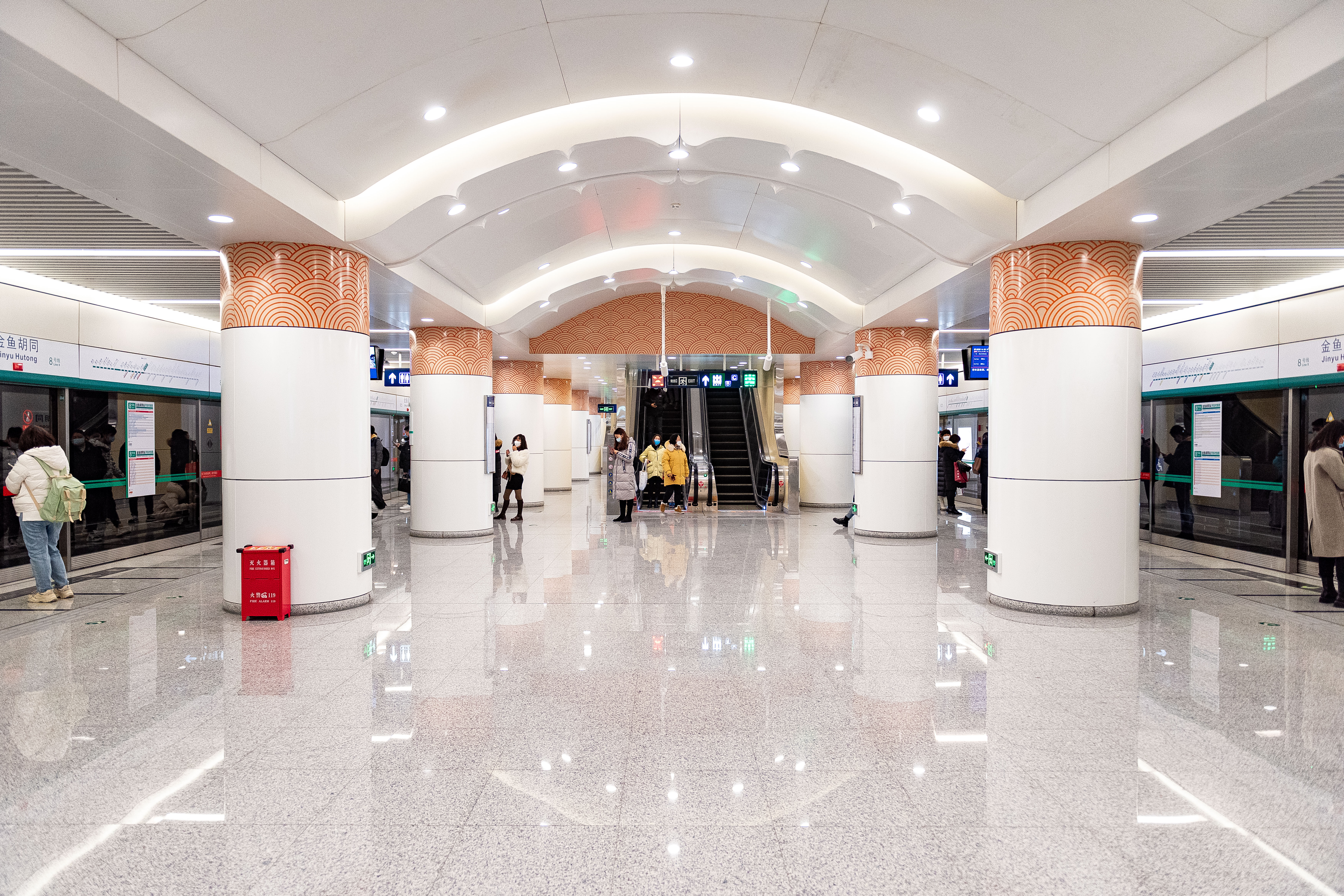
- Platform

General information
- Location: Wangfujing Street / Jinyu Hutong / Donghuamen Street, Dongcheng District, Beijing; China
- Coordinates: 39°54′51″N 116°24′18″E
- Operator: Beijing Mass Transit Railway Operation Corporation Limited
- Line: Line 8
- Platforms: 2 (1 Island platform)
- Tracks: 2

Construction
- Structure type: Underground
- Accessible: Yes

History
- Opened: December 31, 2021

Services
Preceding station	Beijing Subway	Following station
National Art Museum towards Zhuxinzhuang	Line 8	Wangfujing towards Yinghai
Location
- Location within Beijing

Jinyu Hutong station (Chinese: 金鱼胡同站; pinyin: Jīnyú Hútòng zhàn) is a station on Line 8 of the Beijing Subway.

== History ==
Construction started in November 2016. The station was originally called Wangfujing North station. The station opened on December 31, 2021.

== Station layout ==
This station has an island platform. There are 4 exits currently in operation, namely B_{1}, B_{2}, B_{3} and C.

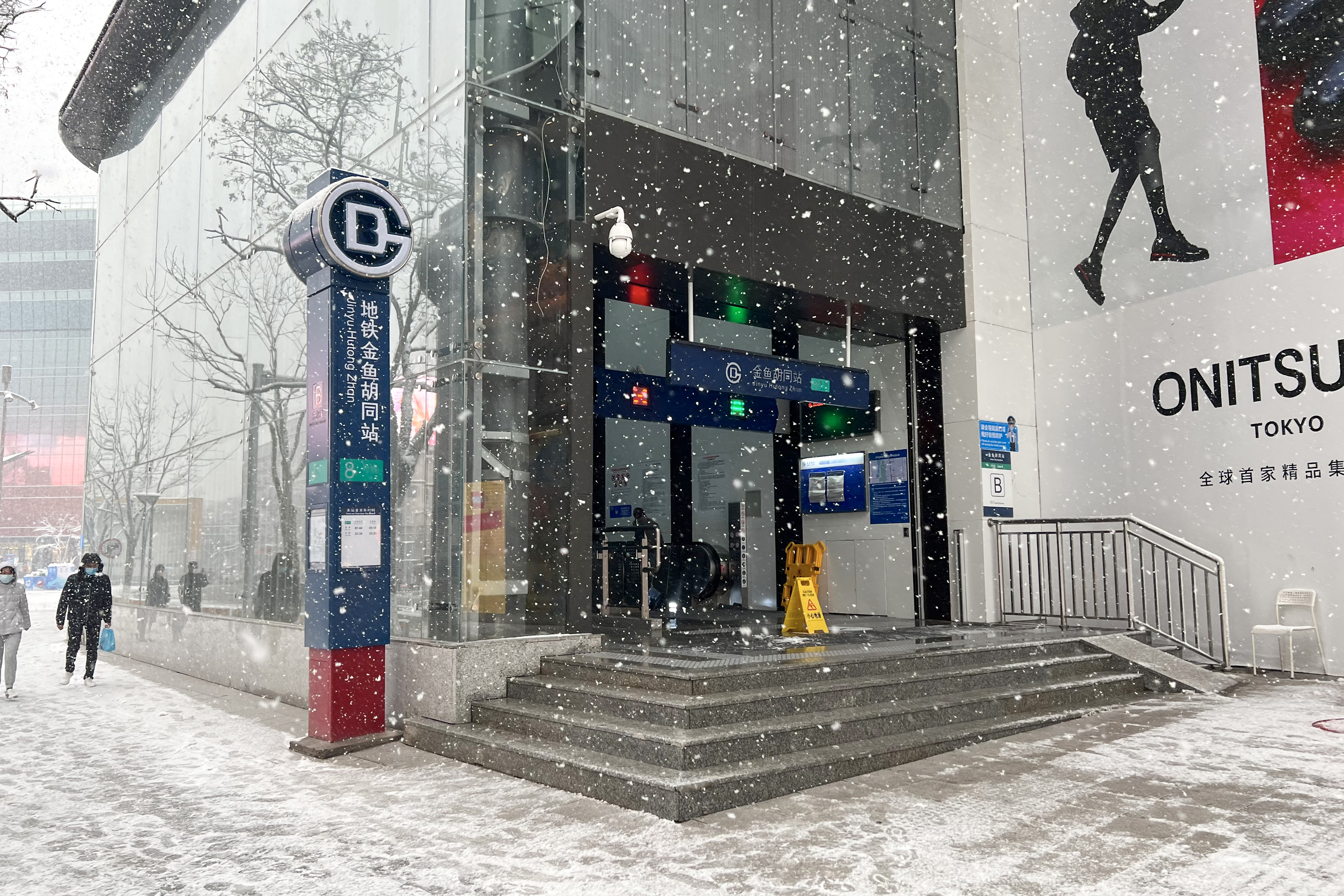
Exit B_{1}

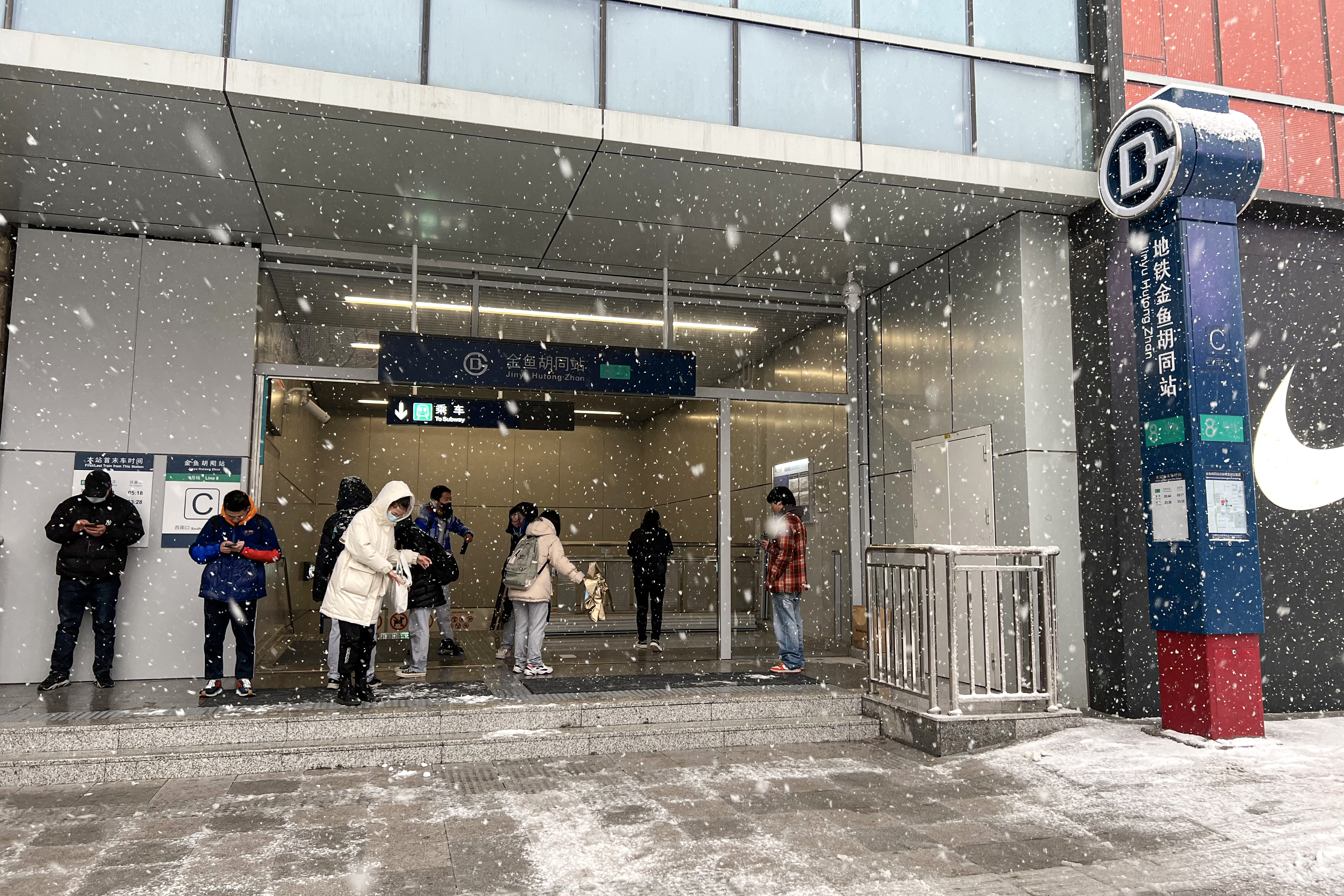
Exit C
