= Senlin Gongyuan Nanmen (Forest Park South Gate) station =

Beijing Subway station

Coordinates: 40°00′36″N 116°23′33″E

Senlin Gongyuan Nanmen (Forest Park South Gate) 森林公园南门
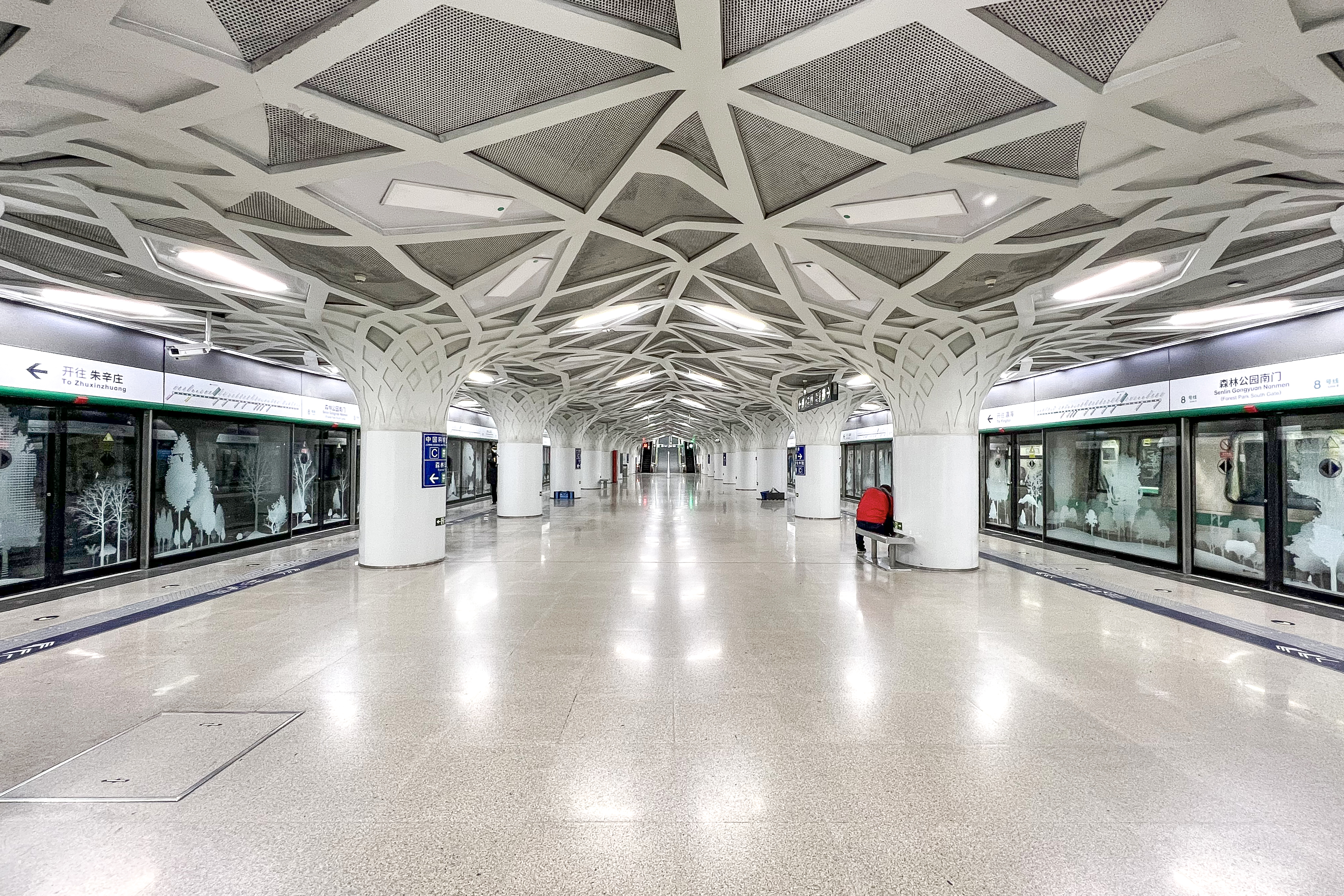
- Platform

General information
- Location: Kehui Road (科荟路); Chaoyang District, Beijing; China
- Operator: Beijing Mass Transit Railway Operation Corporation Limited
- Line: Line 8
- Platforms: 2 (1 island platform)
- Tracks: 2

Construction
- Structure type: Underground
- Accessible: Yes

History
- Opened: July 19, 2008

Services
Preceding station	Beijing Subway	Following station
Lincuiqiao towards Zhuxinzhuang	Line 8	Olympic Park towards Yinghai
Location
- Location within Beijing

Senlin Gongyuan Nanmen (Forest Park South Gate) station (simplified Chinese: 森林公园南门站; traditional Chinese: 森林公園南門站; pinyin: Sēnlín Gōngyuán Nánmén zhàn) is a station on Line 8 of the Beijing Subway. It is located at the south entrance to the Olympic Forest Park.

== Around the station ==
- China Science and Technology Museum
- Olympic Forest Park

== Station layout ==
The station has an underground island platform.

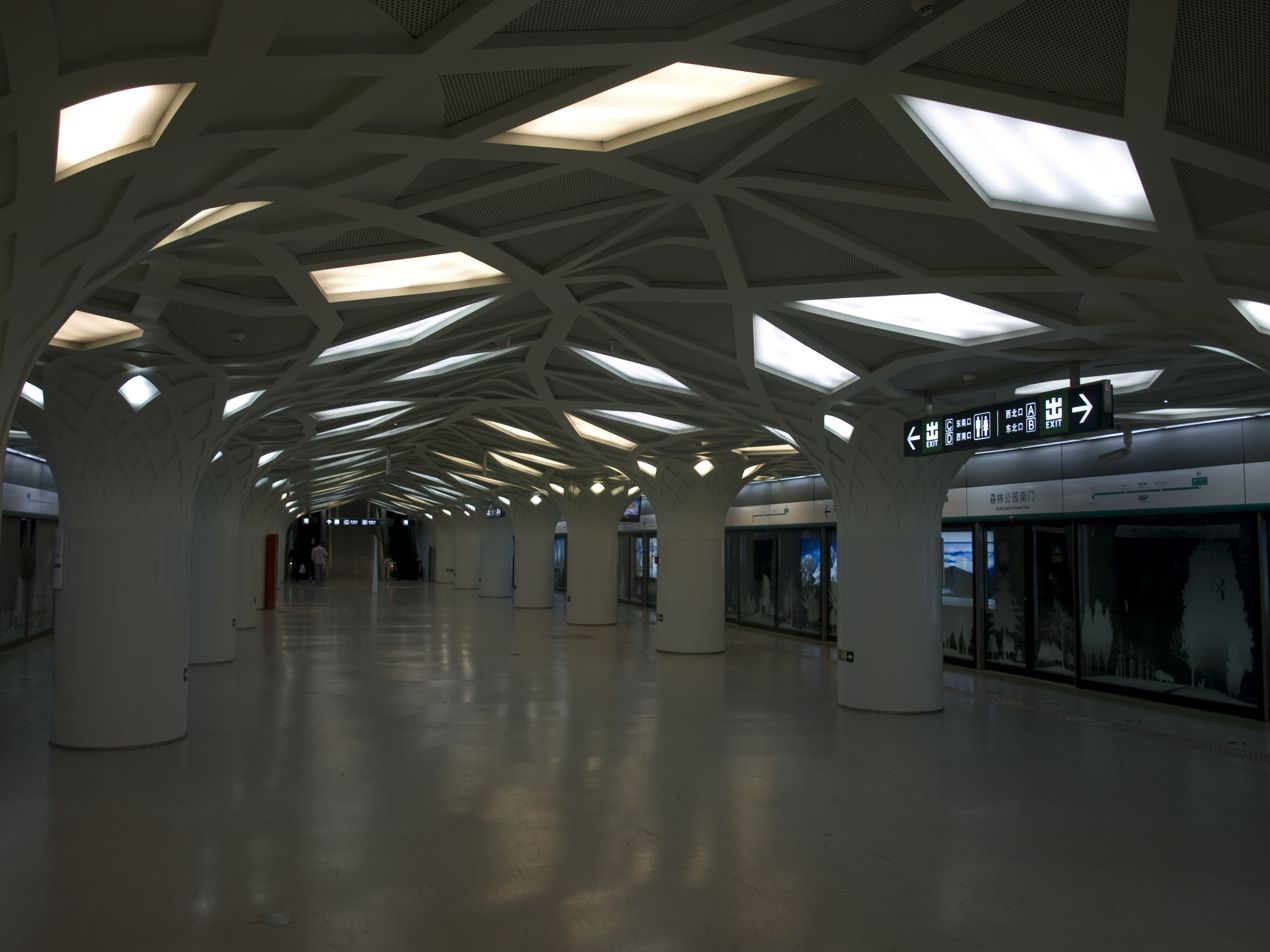
Platform when the station was still the northern terminus of Line 8

== Exits ==
There are 4 exits, lettered A, B, C, and D. Exit D is accessible.
