= Meishuguan zhan =

美術館站 may refer to:

- Museum of Fine Arts railway station
- Kaohsiung Museum of Fine Arts light rail station, a light rail station of Circular light rail

== See also ==
- Zhongguo Meishuguan (National Art Museum) station
