= Beitucheng station =

Beijing Subway interchange station

Beitucheng 北土城
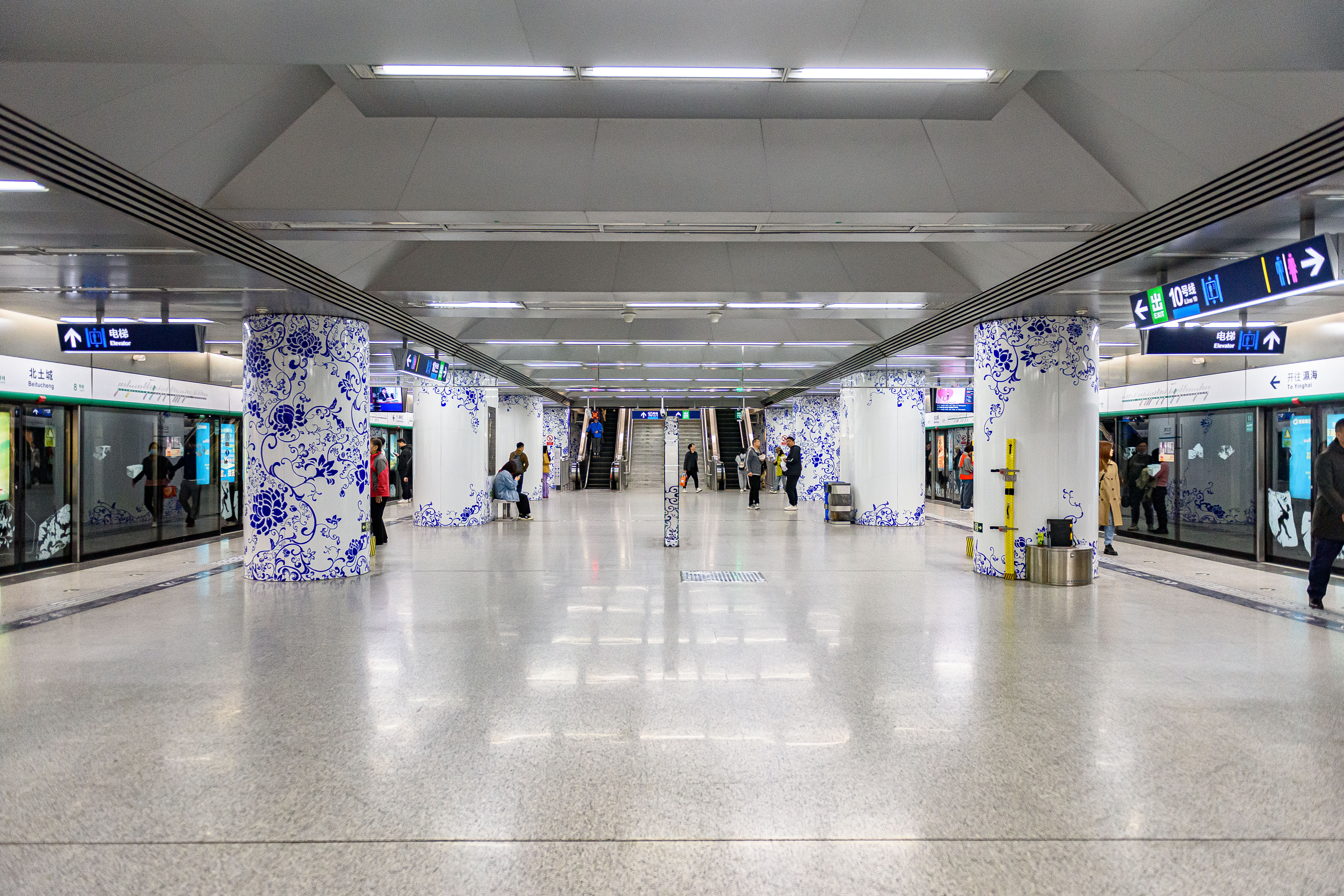
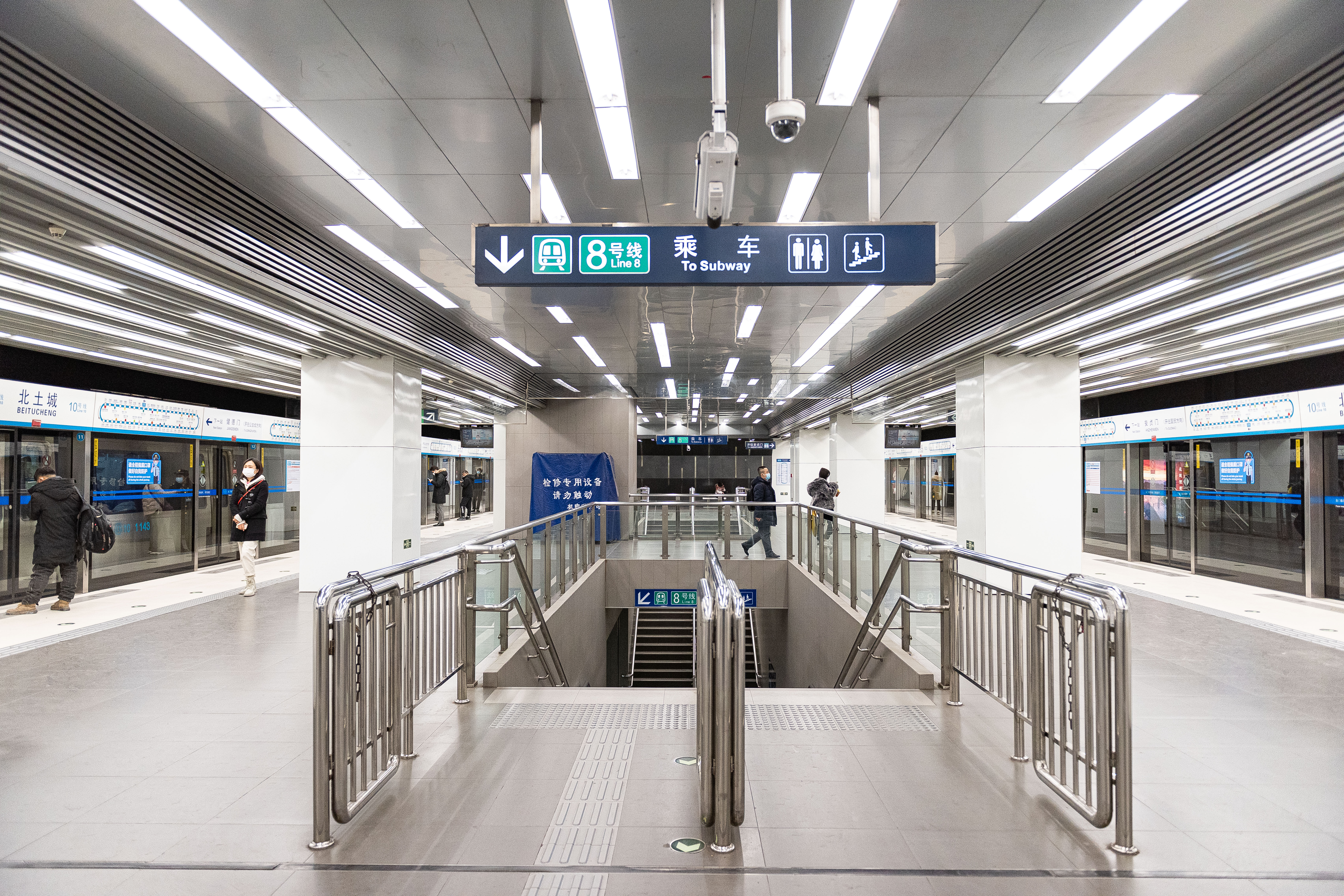
- Line 8 platform Line 10 platform

General information
- Location: Beichen Road and Beitucheng West Road / Beitucheng East Road; Chaoyang District, Beijing; China
- Coordinates: 39°58′37″N 116°23′39″E
- Operator: Beijing Mass Transit Railway Operation Corporation Limited
- Lines: Line 8; Line 10
- Platforms: 4 (2 island platforms)
- Tracks: 4

Construction
- Structure type: Underground
- Accessible: Yes

History
- Opened: July 19, 2008; 18 years ago

Services
Preceding station	Beijing Subway	Following station
Olympic Sports Center towards Zhuxinzhuang	Line 8	Anhua Qiao towards Yinghai
Jiande Men outer loop / anticlockwise	Line 10	Anzhenmen inner loop / clockwise
Location
- Location within Beijing

Beitucheng station (Chinese: 北土城站; pinyin: Běitǔchéng Zhàn) is an interchange station on Line 8 and Line 10 of the Beijing Subway.

== Station layout ==
Both the line 8 and line 10 stations have underground island platforms. The line 8 platforms are located a level below the line 10 platforms.

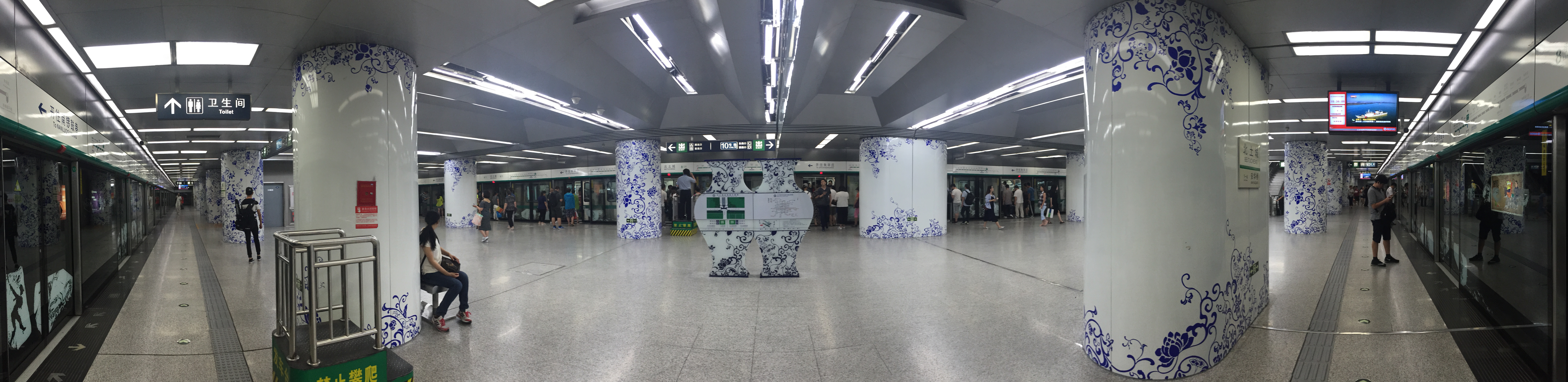
Platform panorama of L8 Beitucheng Station
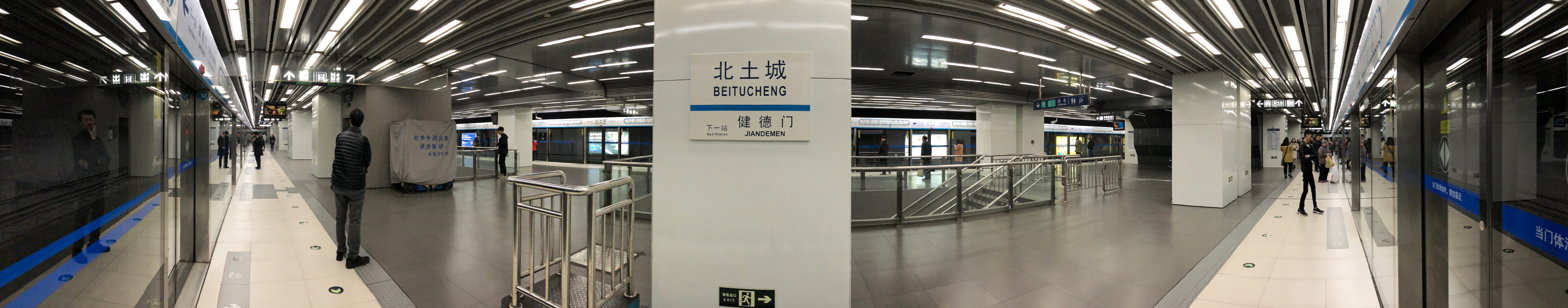
Platform panorama of L10 Beitucheng Station

== Exits ==
There are 6 exits, lettered A, B, C, D, E, and F. Exits A and C are accessible.

== Gallery ==
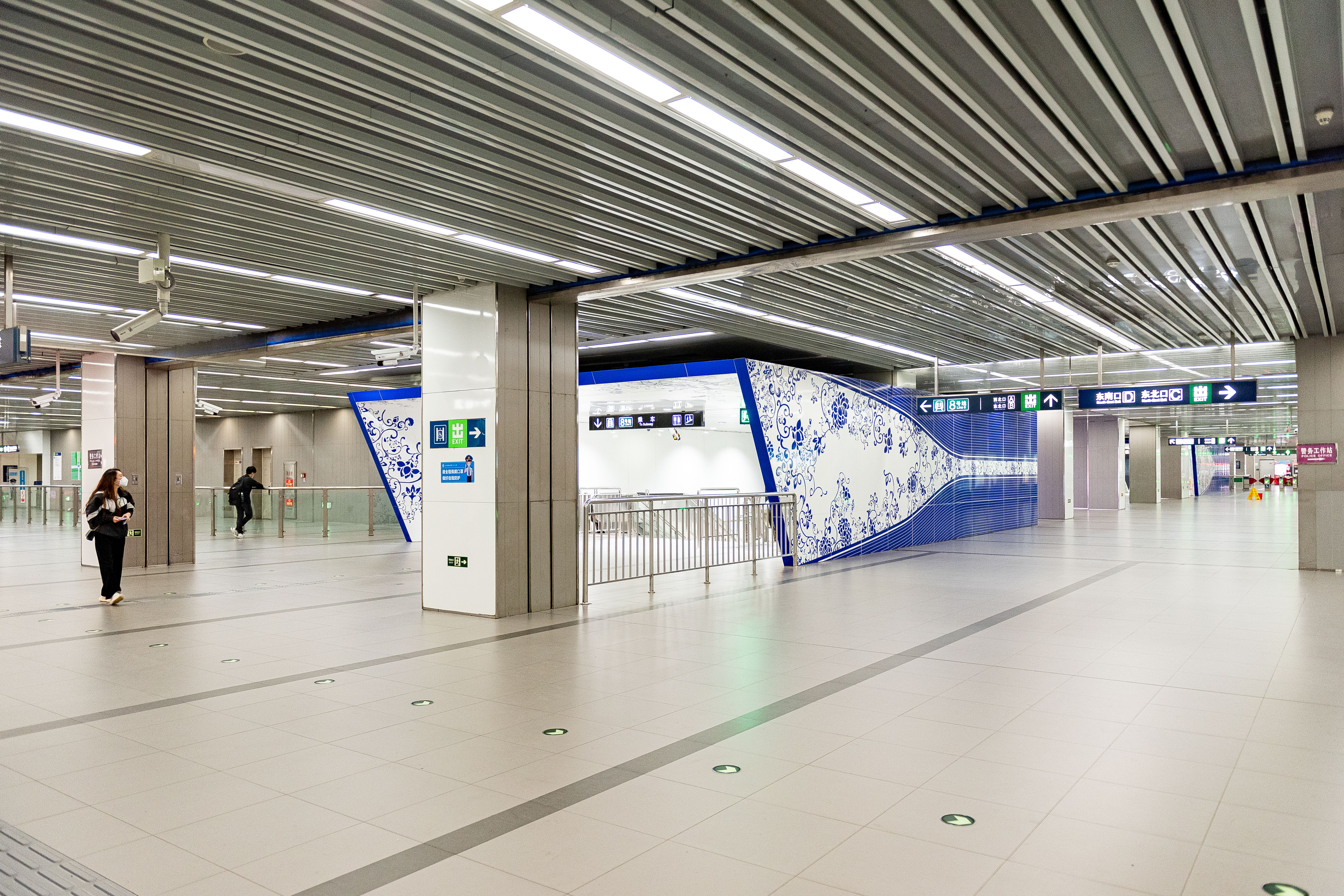
Line 8 concourse

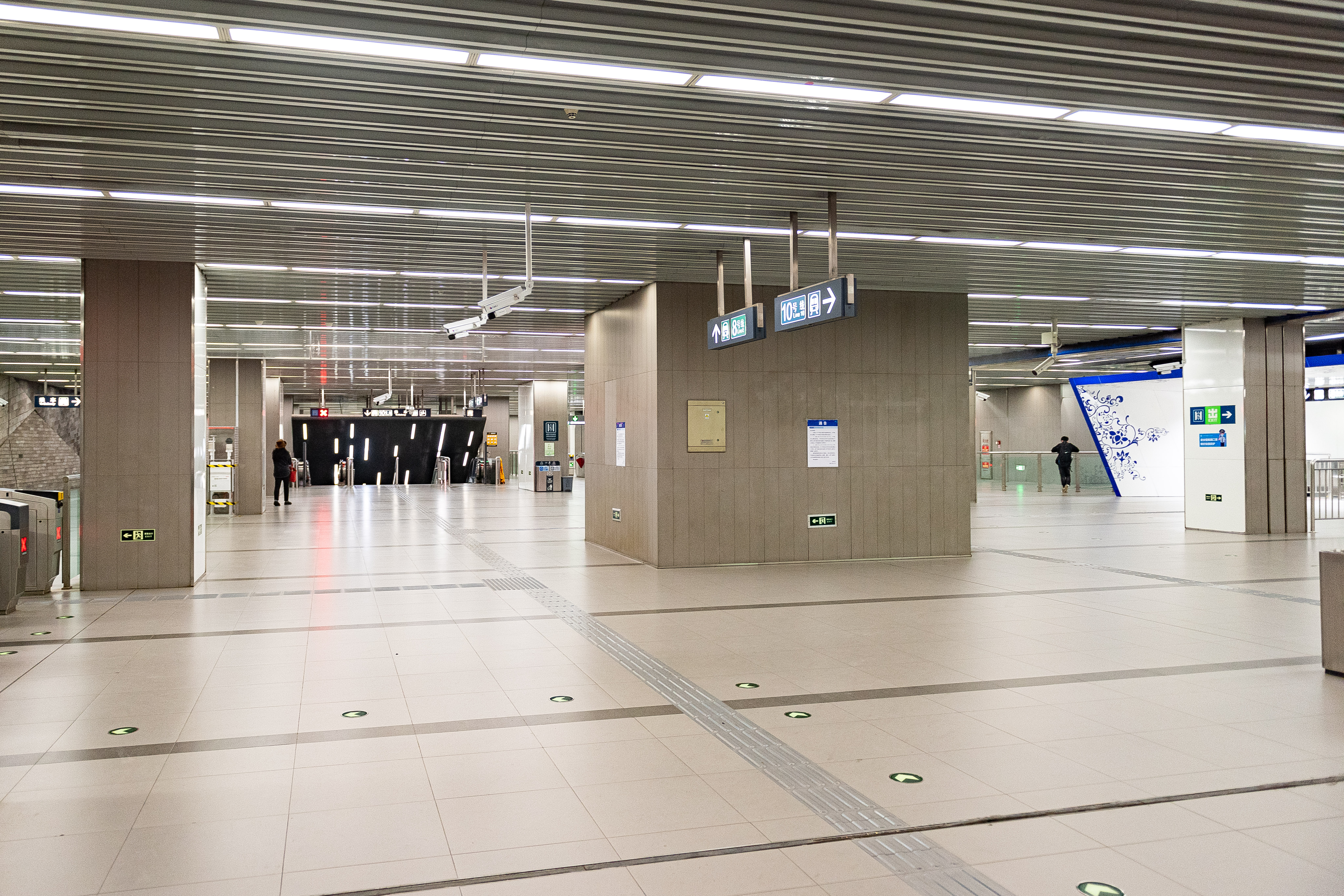
Line 10 concourse

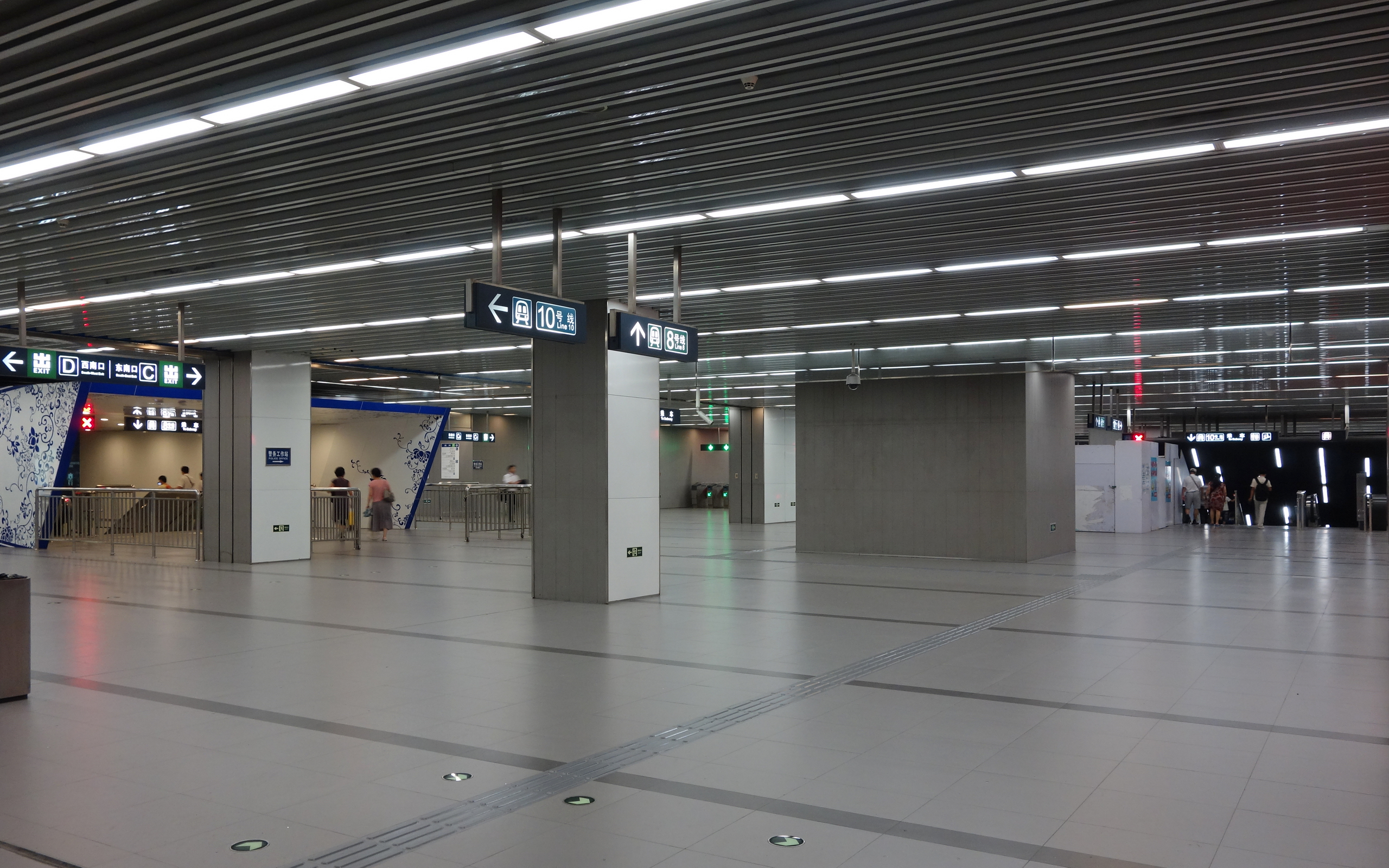
Underground line 8 and line 10 Shared station hall

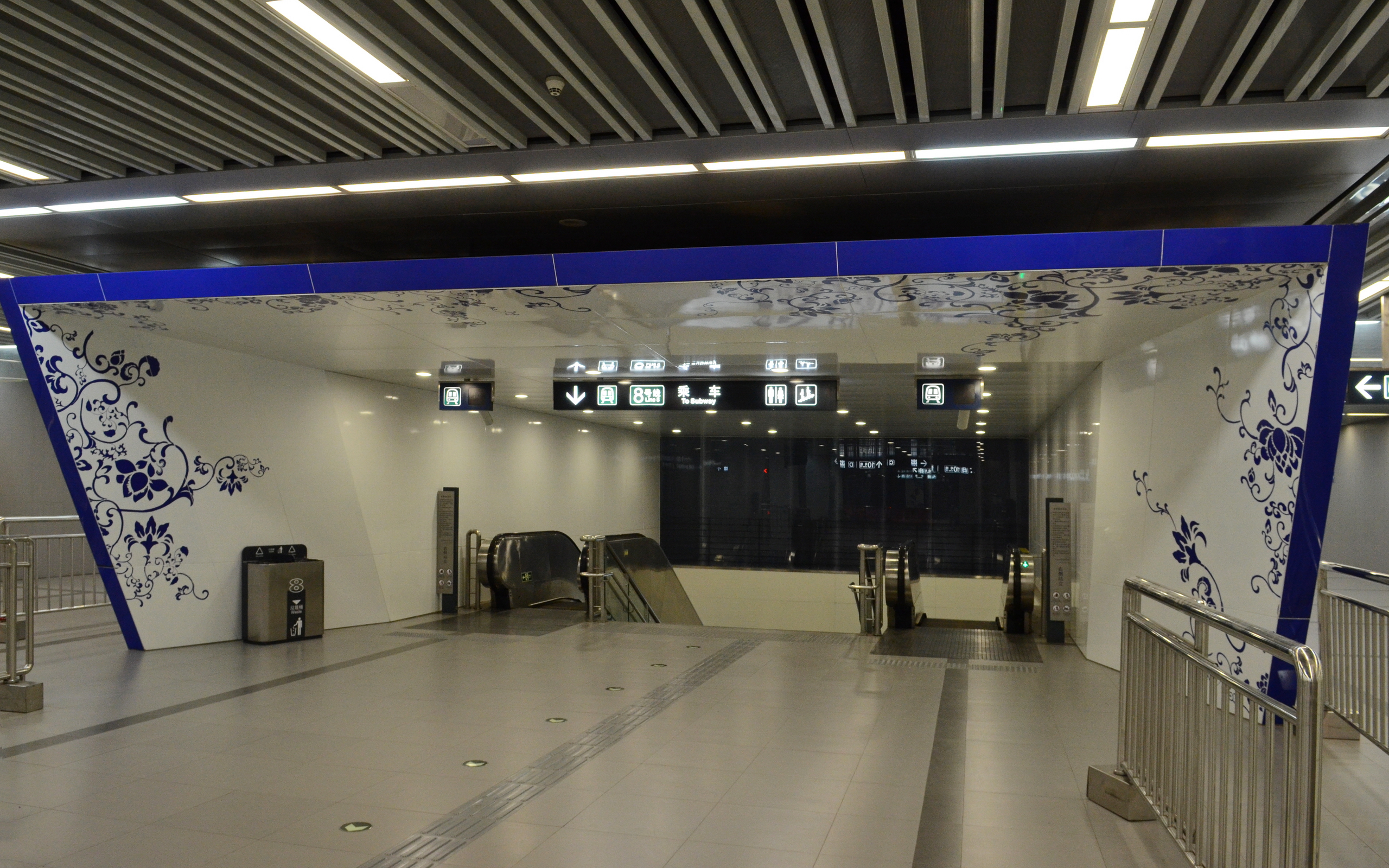
Line 8 platform entrance and exit

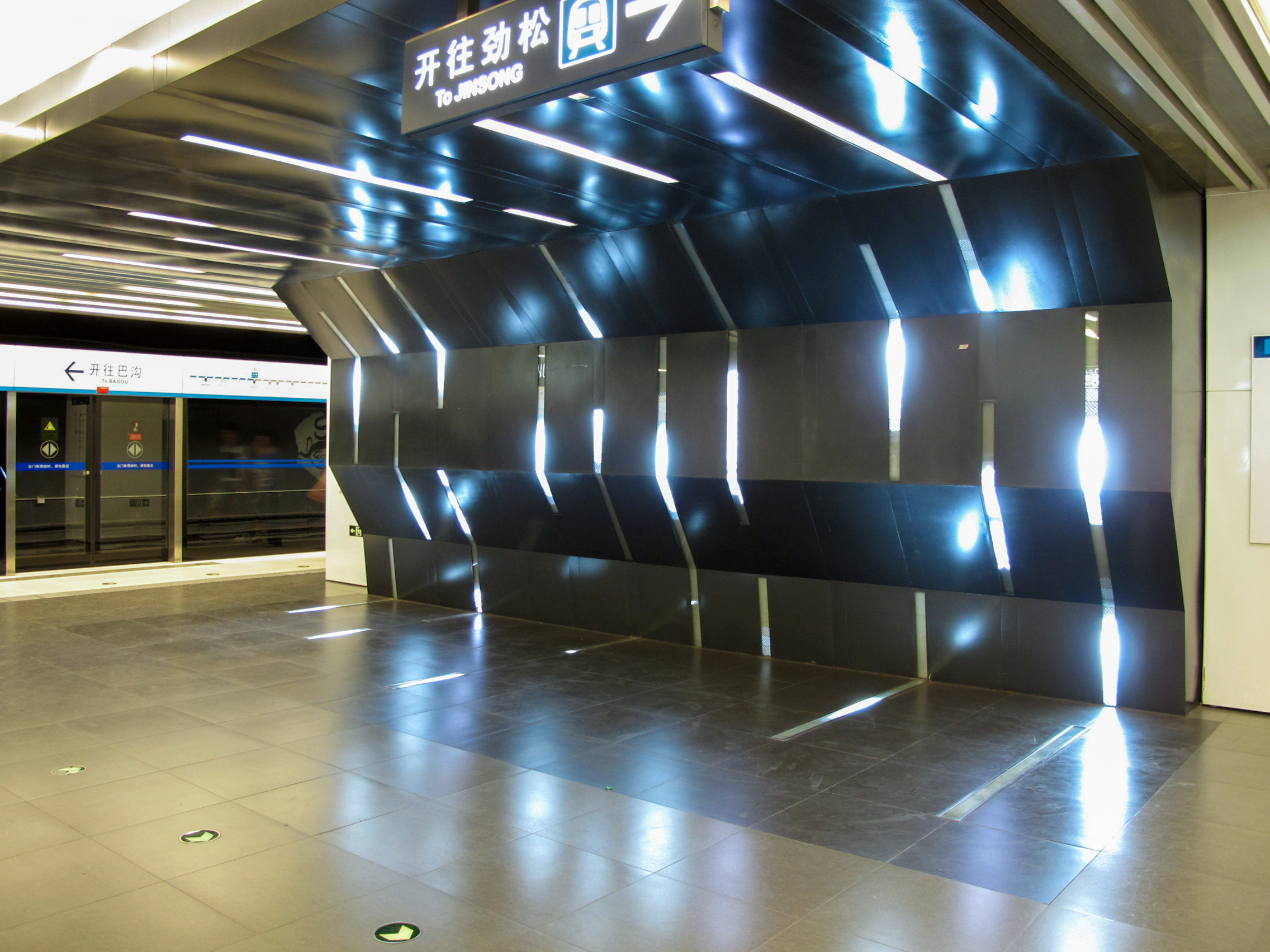
Line 10 platform LED display

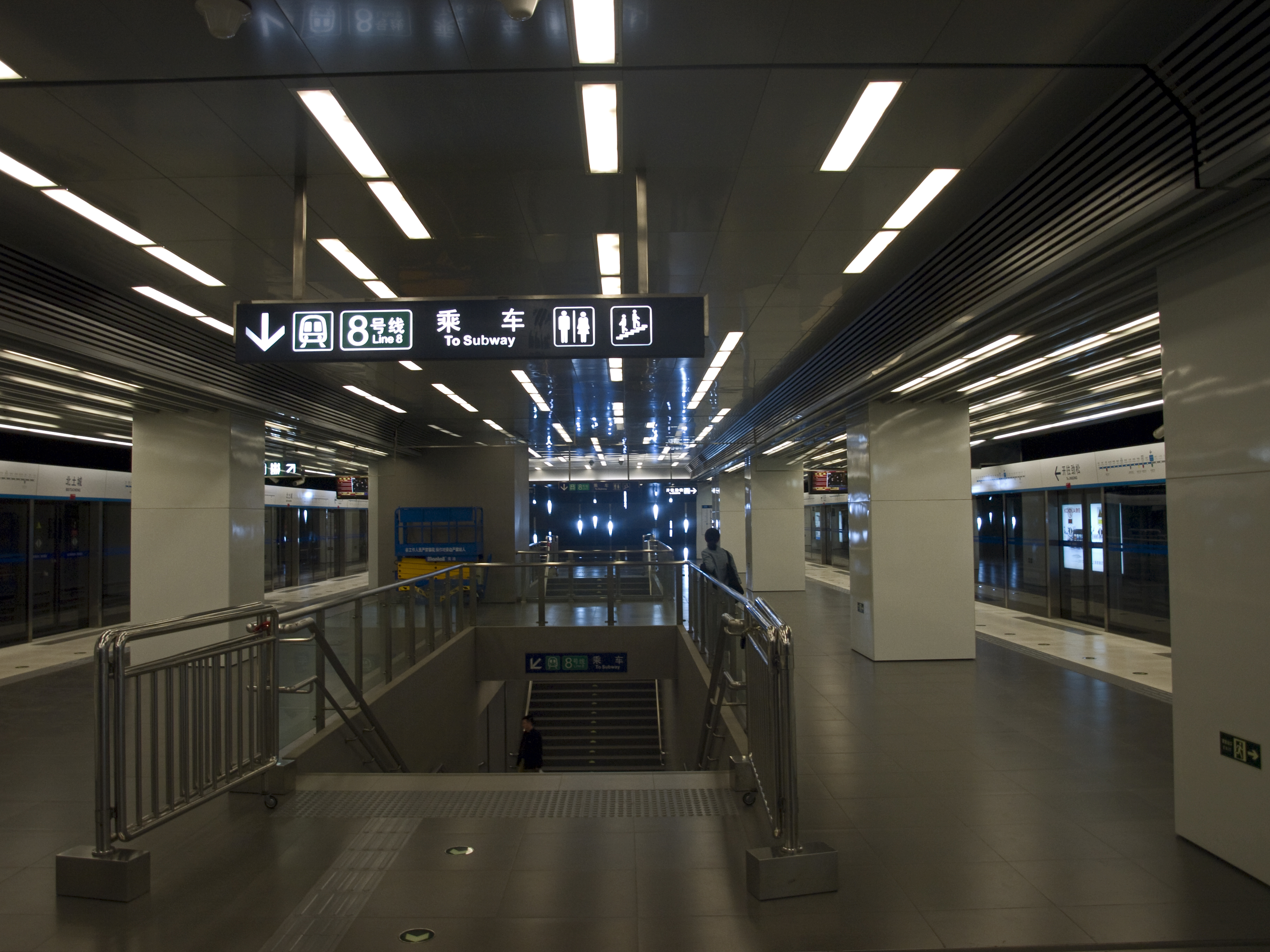
Line 10 to Line 8 transfer node

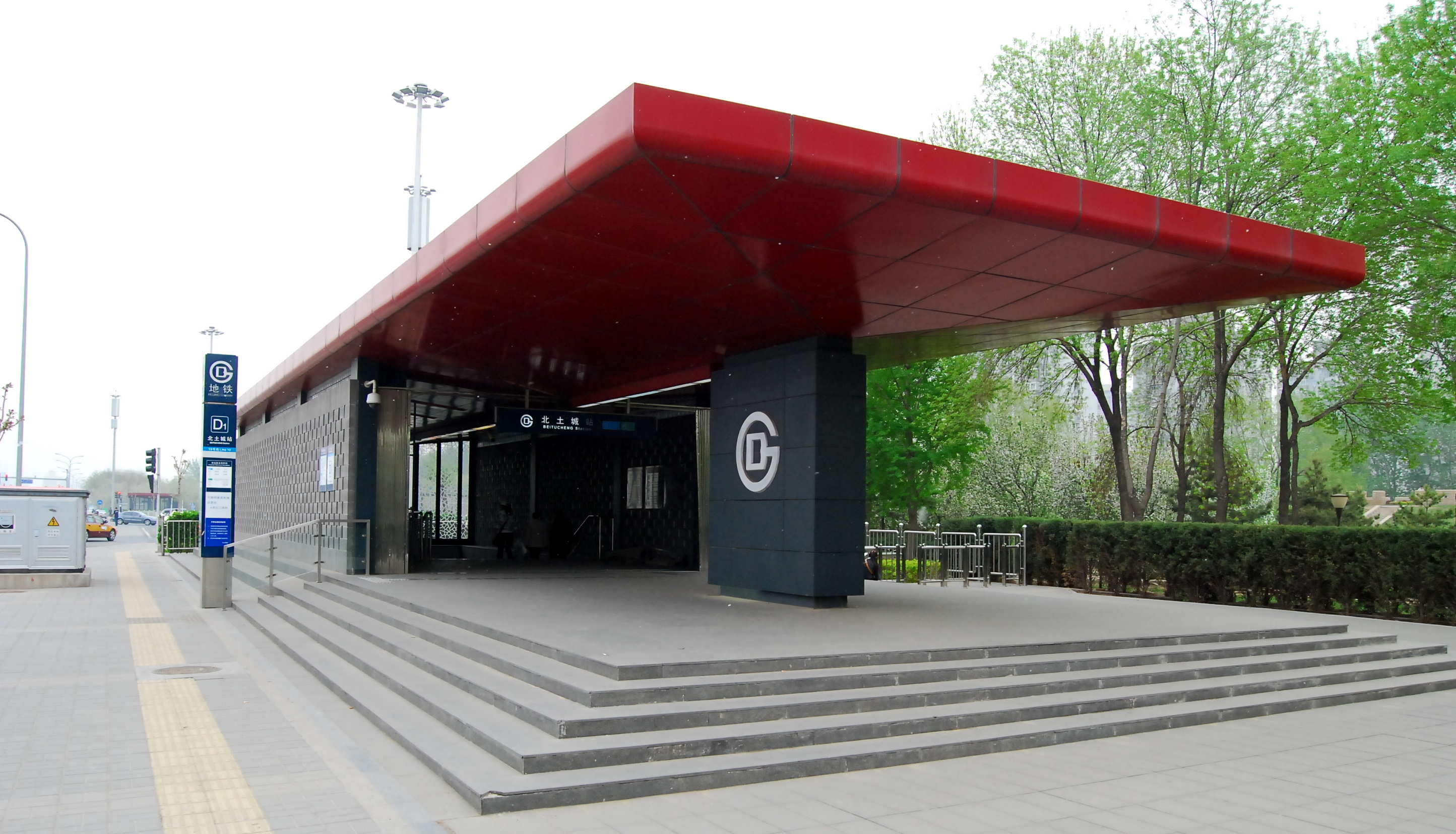
Exit D1
