= Olympic Forest Park =

Forest park in Chaoyang, Beijing, China

- 奥林匹克森林公园
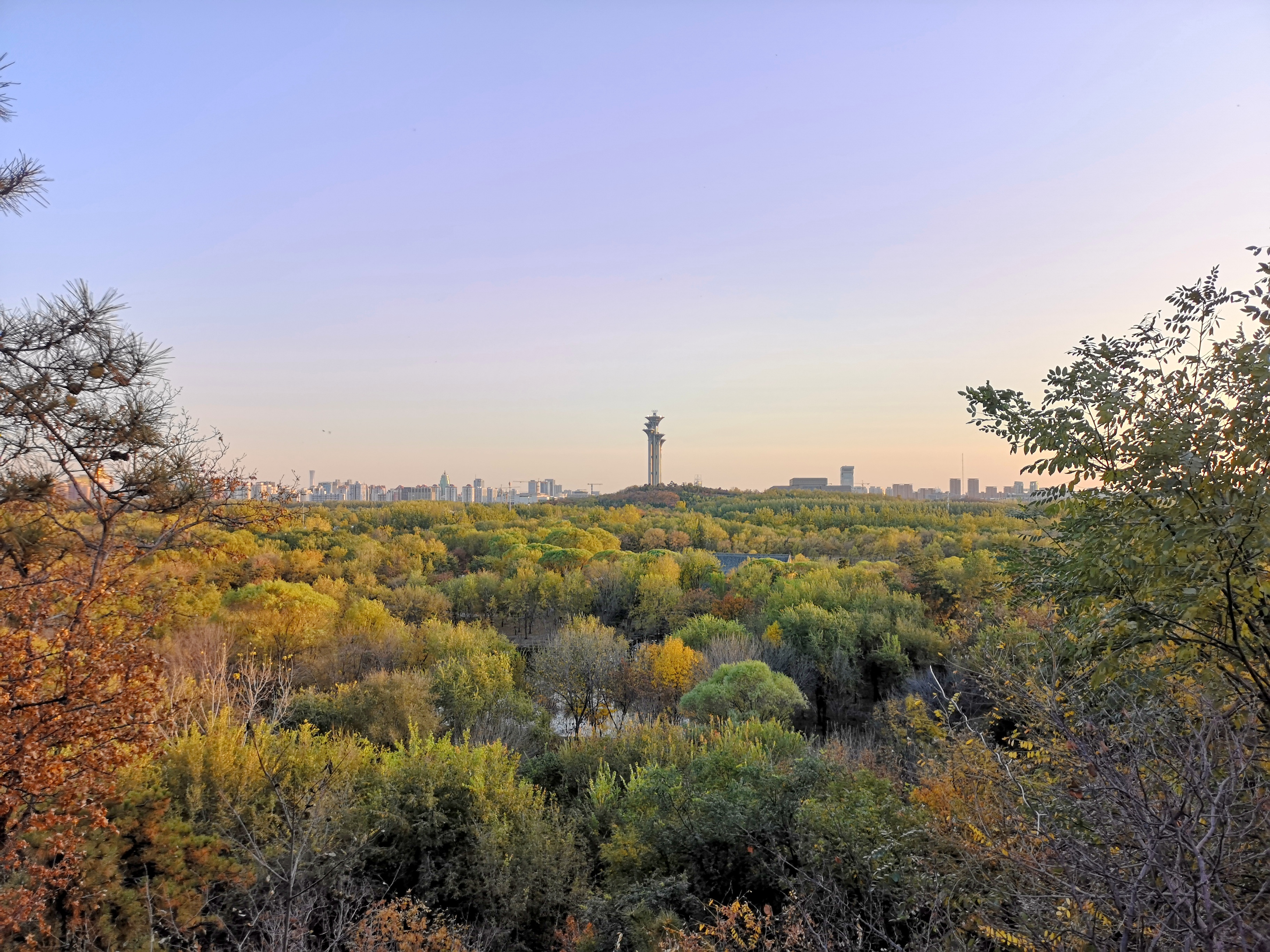
- View of the Olympic Forest Park from north

- Location within Beijing Location within China
- Type: Urban park, Forest park
- Location: Chaoyang District, Beijing, China
- Coordinates: 40°01′03.73″N 116°23′09.81″E
- Area: 680 hectares (1,700 acres)
- Created: 2008
- Status: Open all year
- Website: http://www.bjofp.cn

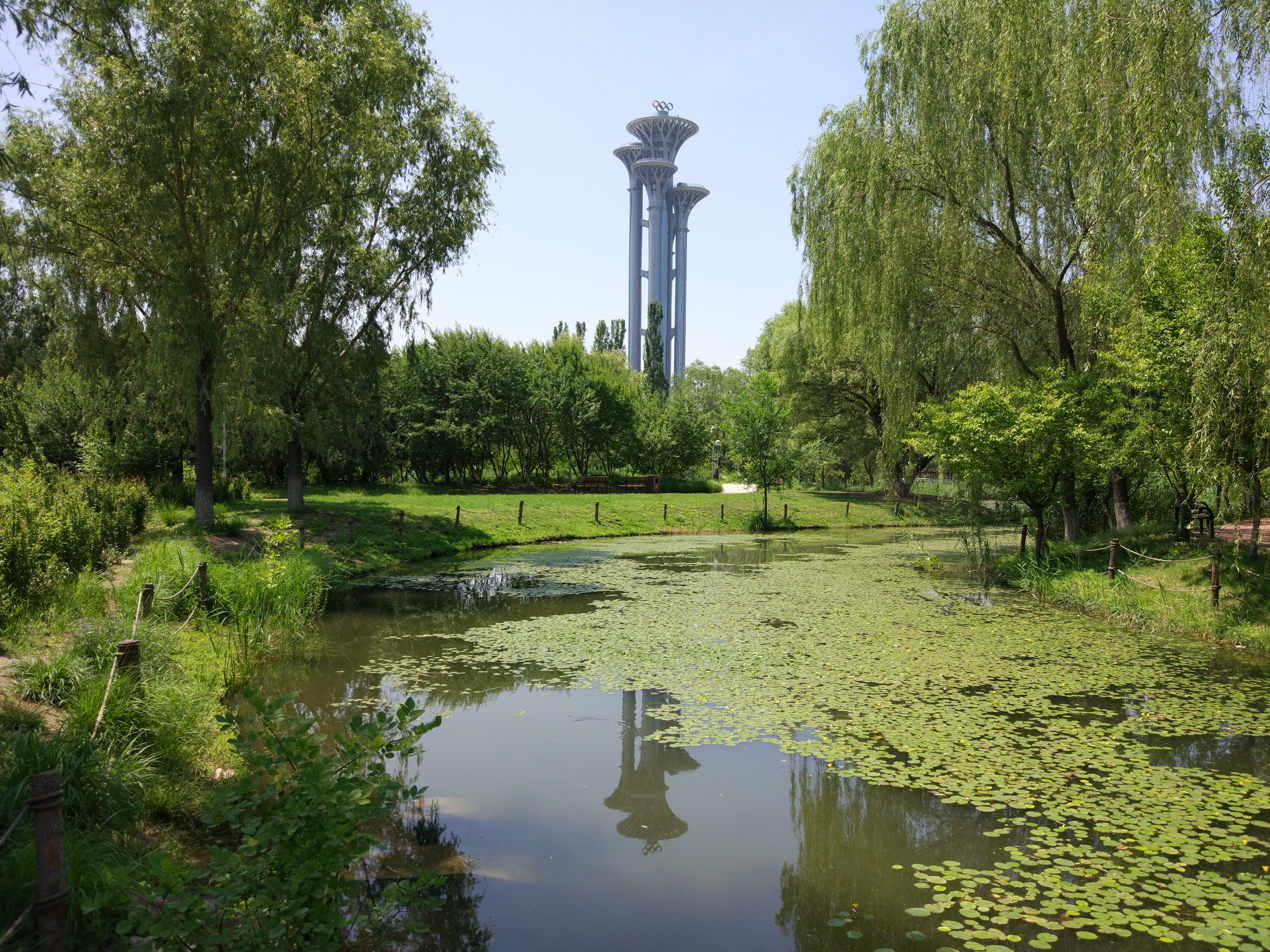
Olympic Forest Park and Beijing Olympic Tower in summer

The Olympic Forest Park (Chinese: 奥林匹克森林公园; pinyin: Àolínpǐkè Sēnlín Gōngyuán) is a large, man-made forest park situated at the north end of the Olympic Green in Beijing. Built for the 2008 Summer Olympics, the park has two parts: the southern part is oval in shape and features Aohai lake in the center, and the northern side has a mountain that gives an excellent view of this part of the city. The northern part is outside of the 5th Ring Road. The park was designed by Sasaki and implemented by the Tsinghua Landscape Design Institute.

The park features many walking paths and a jogging path. Several small islands in the lake are linked by bridges. The south-east end of the lake has a handful of carnival rides for children.

== Layout ==
The Beijing Olympic Forest Park is located on the northern end of the city's north–south central meridian, where the Forbidden City palace is also situated and is divided by the North Fifth Ring Road. The park is composed of a Northern Garden and a Southern Garden which is connected by an ecological bridge that extends over the Beijing's expressway. Within these two garden sections are various features such as the Yangshan Mountain, Aohai Sea, large-scale flower fields, and artificial wetland. The park also contains large sports fields like the National Tennis Center, football field, and hockey field.

=== Southern Garden ===
The Southern Garden is an area of around 1.5 square miles (3.9 square kilometers) and is well known for the Yangshan Mountain and Aohai Sea. In addition to these two sites, there is a man-made wetland in the northwest area of the Southern Gardens which has a transparent underwater corridor; to the west of the corridor is a small waterfall that cascades down in tiers. Also, during the 2008 Olympic Games, tennis, shooting, and hockey competitions were held in the west of the Southern Garden in three large stadiums adjacent to each other. As of today, only the National Tennis Center remains for its original purpose; there is a large-scale green field in place of the shooting range while the hockey field was reconstructed for football. There are other fields for various sports in the northwest corner of the Southern Garden such as football, basketball, and badminton.

==== Aohai Sea ====
From the entry in the southern gate, visitors can see a large patch of water which is the Aohai Sea. The Grand Music Fountain performance is also able to be seen from bleachers of the wide open-air square at the south bank. The fountain's highest spout can reach 262 feet (80 meters) in height and is able to change the water into different shapes that correspond to the music's' rhythm.

==== Yangshan Mountain ====
The Yangshan Mountain is an artificial landscape on the north bank of the Aohai Sea. At the top of the man-made mountain is a viewing platform called Tianjing with two vantage points, Zhaohua (朝花) and Xishi (夕拾), at the west and east sides.

==== National Tennis Center ====
The National Tennis Center is an area of 200,000 square yards (167,225 square meters) and holds 10 competition courts and six practice courts with a total of 17,400 guests' seats. The stadium is constructed from reinforced concrete with no decoration and pale-grey concrete walls; there is a central court and two main courts that are designed in a dodecagon formation with 12 bleachers on each edge. During the China Open, the top tennis players gather from all over the world to compete at the tennis center.

=== Northern Garden ===
The Northern Garden is a space dedicated to plants and animals as well as a place for people to be able to immerse themselves in nature. In the center of the Northern Garden, there is a lake, while to the southwest, there are large flower fields that showcases sunflowers, marigolds, and maidenhairs.

== Design and Sustainability ==
To lessen the ecological pressure on Beijing and its limited water resources, a self-sustaining and self-regulating water body was in great need; however, the construction provided to be a large technical challenge of the Olympic Forest Park due to the dry climate and high evaporation rate of the area. The Olympic Forest Park utilizes reclaimed water as a main source of water for the landscape, which is a first for China's urban parks; this is done through a system that incorporates existing water bodies to create a dynamic water reclamation and reuse system that uses purified greywater, surface runoff, rain and floodwater as a source. In the dry seas, water can be restored to Beijing using two alternative water circulation systems; in the rainy season, the water systems can also help the city discharge floodwater. In addition, an early warning system and dynamic water quality simulation was built to predict pattern changes in water quality and give forewarnings.

The main water features of the Olympic Forest Park are a lake (20.3ha) and wetland (4.15ha). The wetland design emphasized education throughout the landscape; a boardwalk is implemented around and through the wetland so that visitors have the opportunity to learn about the process on glass walls. There is a greenhouse that refines 600 cubic meters of water each day to explain the water purification systems by having an interactive exhibition.

For the Olympic Forest Park design to generate habitats that facilitate and maintain local biodiversity, the choice and placement of plant species mandated research of many different native plants; such as their communities and conditions as well as to the recognition of patterns of plant species, frequency, dimensions, seasonal features, and application conditions. Indigenous plant species' seed that had genetic advantages were chosen for the landscape in order to benefit the environment in a way such as encouraging biodiverse and creating primary habitats for mammals; this resulted in more than 300 plant flames being selected to use in the Olympic Forest Park.

Analyses of plants and their growth on the site were mapped during field surveys; many of the plants were kept in their original location and became new features in the landscape such as isolated and preserved islands. The topsoil and earth which was excavated from the park's bodies of water and other parts of the park ground was used in the construction of landforms and creation of the main mountain. To connect the Southern Garden and Northern Garden together, an ecological corridor bridge is planned over the Fifth Ring Road; the bridge allows the park to maintain the network of the urban ecological system, facilitate migration and disruption of plant species, protect biodiversity, and connect forest patches.

The park incorporates over 90 buildings which were designed as prototypes for various energy-saving and reuse ideas, technologies, and materials. The building all featured exterior walls that implemented geothermal pump systems, thermal insulation materials, and central ventilation systems which had independent temperature controls as well as humidity and tubular skylight materials. The roofs of the pergolas installed solar panels while the decking, railing, and accessories used new recyclable wood and plastic composites. The fertilizer created by the life and waste of the garden through a recycling and reuse system of solid waste is applied throughout the park.

== Landscape Performance Benefits ==
=== Environmental ===
There have been many proven environmental benefits from the landscape performance of the Olympic Forest Park. The trees in the Olympic Forest Park sequester around 3,962 metric tons (8,735,000 lbs) of carbon dioxide annually which is equivalent to removing 777 passenger vehicles off the road. The park decreased the annual consumption of potable water by 950,000 cubic meters (250 million gallons), which is comparable to 380 Olympic-sized swimming pools, for irrigation and to recharge the park's bodies of water through using reclaimed water from the Qinghe Waste Water Treatment Plant. In addition, the Olympic Forest Park creates 83,000 kWh of electricity per year from solar photovoltaic panels that are installed on the top of the trellis structure at the park's south gate. By doing so, the energy created by the panels is enough to meet the energy needs of 227 China residents for a year as well as lower the consumption of coal by 30 metric tons (66,000 lbs). The decline of coal use has an added benefit of reducing carbon dioxide emissions by 8 metric tons (172,000 lbs), sulfur dioxide by 720 kg (1,590 lb), nitric oxide by 210 kg (460 lb), smoke by 81 kg (179 lb), and dust by 45 kg (99 lb) per year.

=== Social ===
A social benefit that has occurred from the Olympic Forest Park is that the park has drastically improved the quality of life for 96% of 373 visitors who were surveyed. For the visitors who were interviewed, they stated that the park is a very nice place because it provided ample recreation and exercise opportunities. In 2011, the park was able to provide an outdoor classroom for around 2,000 children from elementary schools within 2 km.

=== Economic ===
As for the economic benefits, 1,563 new jobs were produced, such as landscape, security, and cleaning services, from the construction of the Olympic Forest Park.

=== Transport ===
Senlin Gongyuan Nanmen (Forest Park South Gate) station on Line 8, Beijing Subway is located at the south entrance to the park. Lincuiqiao station on Line 8 is located near the west entrance to the park, National Tennis Center and National Speed Skating Oval.
