= Zhongguo Meishuguan (National Art Museum) station =

Beijing Subway station

Zhongguo Meishuguan (National Art Museum) 中国美术馆
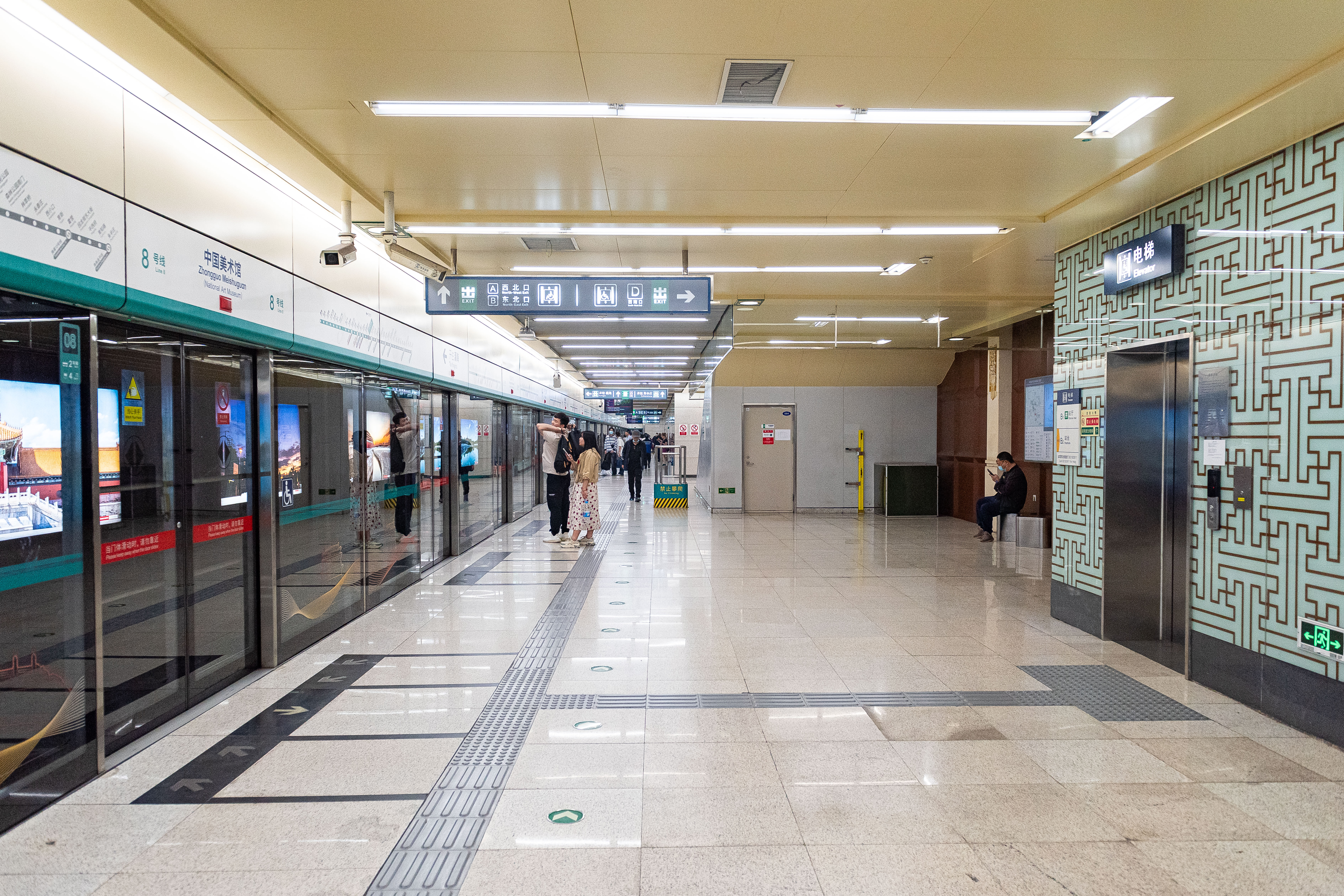
- Southbound platform

General information
- Location: Meishuguan East Street (美术馆东街) and Wusi Avenue; Dongcheng District, Beijing; China
- Coordinates: 39.925274°N 116.410835°E
- Operator: Beijing Mass Transit Railway Operation Corporation Limited
- Line: Line 8
- Platforms: 2 (1 split island platform)
- Tracks: 2

Construction
- Structure type: Underground
- Accessible: Yes

History
- Opened: December 30, 2018

Services
Preceding station	Beijing Subway	Following station
Nanluogu Xiang towards Zhuxinzhuang	Line 8	Jinyu Hutong towards Yinghai
Location
- Location within Beijing

Zhongguo Meishuguan (National Art Museum) station (simplified Chinese: 中国美术馆站; traditional Chinese: 中國美術館站; pinyin: Zhōngguó Měishùguǎn zhàn) is a station on Line 8 of the Beijing Subway. It was opened on December 30, 2018. This station served as the terminus of the North section of Line 8 until December 31, 2021.

The station is named after the National Art Museum of China.

== Station layout ==
The station has an underground island platform.

== Exits ==
There are 3 exits, lettered A, B, and D. Exits A and D are accessible.
