= Line 8 (Beijing Subway) =

Rapid transit line in Beijing

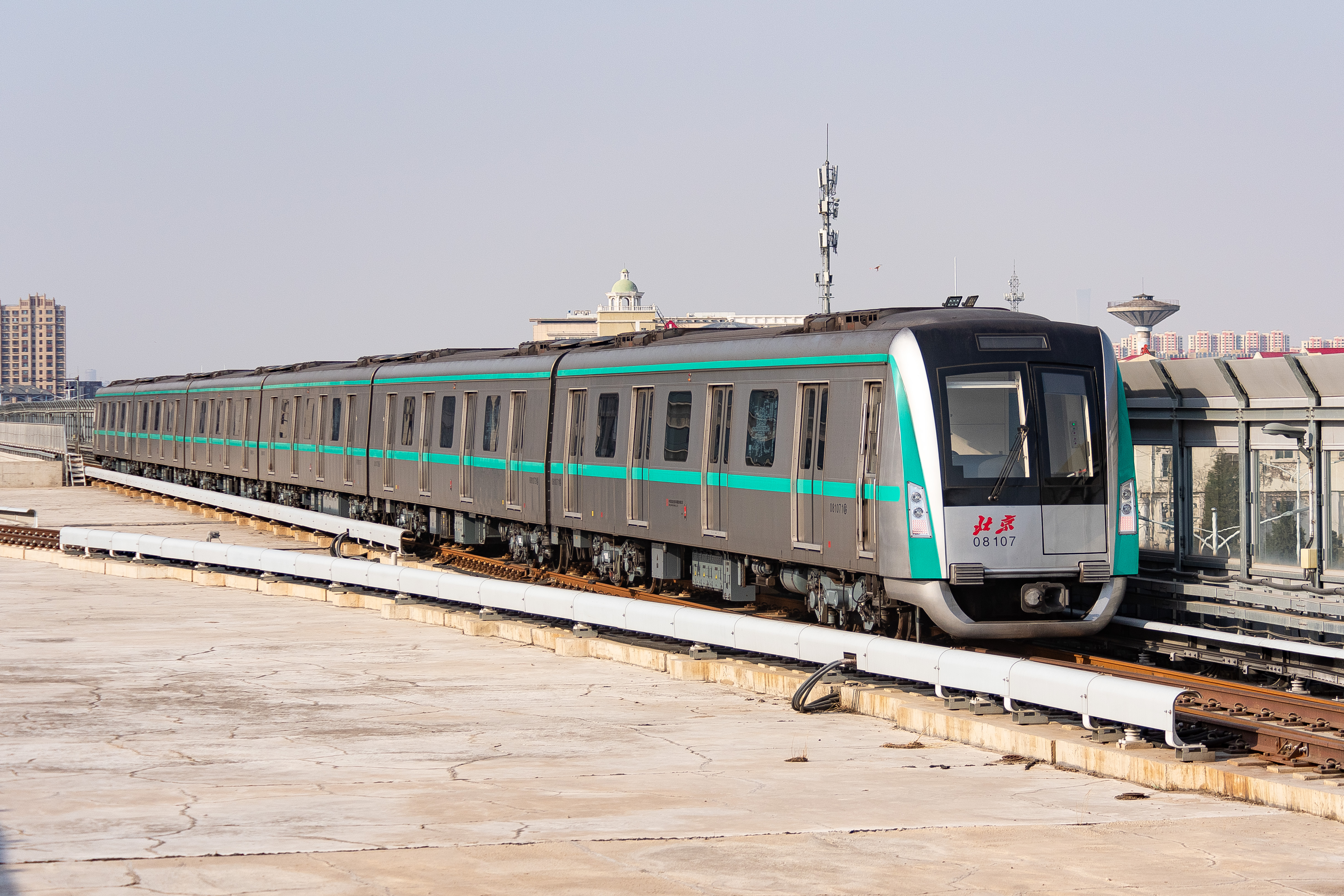
- Line 8 train at Yinghai station

Overview
- Other name(s): M8 (planned name); Olympic Branch Line (Chinese: 奥运支线) (for Beitucheng to Forest Park South Gate Section)
- Status: Operational
- Locale: Dongcheng, Chaoyang, Haidian, and Changping districts Beijing
- Termini: Zhuxinzhuang - Yinghai
- Stations: 35

Service
- Type: Rapid transit
- System: Beijing Subway
- Operator: Beijing Mass Transit Railway Operation Corp., Ltd
- Depot(s): Pingxifu, Yinghai
- Rolling stock: 6-car Type B (SFM12, SFM42)
- Daily ridership: 611,300 (2024 Avg.)

History
- Opened: July 19, 2008; 18 years ago

Technical
- Line length: 49.5 km (30.8 mi)
- Character: Underground & Elevated
- Track gauge: 1,435 mm (4 ft 8 1/2 in) standard gauge
- Electrification: 750 V DC third rail
- Operating speed: 80 km/h (50 mph)

Line 8 of the Beijing Subway (Chinese: 北京地铁8号线; pinyin: běijīng dìtiě bāhàoxiàn) is a rapid transit line in Beijing. It sits on the central axis of Beijing. Line 8's color is green on all official maps, signage, and station branding. It is 49.5 km (30.8 mi) in length with 35 stations (34 in operation). The most recent extension is the central section from National Art Museum to Zhushikou, which opened on 31 December 2021.

== Route ==
=== North Section ===
In the north, Line 8 begins at Zhuxinzhuang on the Changping Line and heads east to Huilongguan Residential Area and then south through the Line 13 arc at Huoying, to the Olympic Park station on Line 15. The line enters the Line 10 loop at Beitucheng and then the Line 2 loop at Gulou Dajie before reaching Nanluogu Xiang on Line 6, and then to National Art Museum.

Apart from the Zhuxinzhuang station and an 1.7 km (1.056 mi) section of elevated track leading therefrom, the entire line runs underground.

=== Central Section ===
Three stations (Jinyu Hutong, Wangfujing and Qianmen) on the central section opened on 31 December 2021.

=== South Section ===
The south section of Line 8, from Zhushikou to Yinghai, is 16.4 km (10.190 mi) long and has a 2.06 km (1.280 mi) elevated section. All stations are underground, except for Demao and Yinghai stations, which are elevated.

== Stations ==
Station Name		Connections	Nearby Bus Stops	Distance km		Location
English	Chinese	Connections	Nearby Bus Stops	Distance km		Location
Zhuxinzhuang	朱辛庄	Changping	417 463 560 871 880 880专 898 899 昌19 昌73 C122 C124 快速直达专线27 专49	0.000	0.000	Changping
Yuzhi Lu	育知路		460 462 463 560 昌19 快速直达专线202 专79 专80 专102	2.318	2.318	Changping
Pingxi Fu	平西府		344 428 460 996 快速直达专线202 专131 专192	1.985	4.303	Changping
Huilongguan Dongdajie	回龙观东大街	18	367 441 462 478 558 607 618 636 681 996 C113 快速直达专线203 夜38 专52 专101 专192 专193	2.056	6.359	Changping
Huoying	霍营	13 ( S2 via HKP)	371 462 478 551 558 606 607 681 专52 专192	1.114	7.473	Changping
Yuxin	育新		315 355 371 379 393 398 432 462 606 607 614 617 693 昌75 专89 专139	1.894	9.367	Changping / Haidian
Xixiao Kou	西小口		379 专89	1.543	10.910	Haidian
Yongtaizhuang	永泰庄		81 379 476 490 专89	1.041	11.951	Haidian
Lincuiqiao	林萃桥		81 379 478 510 专44	2.553	14.504	Chaoyang
Senlin Gongyuan Nanmen (Forest Park South Gate)	森林公园南门			2.555	17.059	Chaoyang
Aolinpike Gongyuan (Olympic Park)	奥林匹克公园	15	311 319 379 450 466 484 695	1.016	18.075	Chaoyang
Aoti Zhongxin (Olympic Sports Center)	奥体中心		607	1.667	19.742	Chaoyang
Beitucheng	北土城	10	5 21 81 82 92 113 142 300快 380 409 515 607 620 653 877 889 919 专8	0.900	20.642	Chaoyang
Anhua Qiao	安华桥	12	5 21 82 92 113 142 300 300快 302 328 361 368 380 387 409 515 601 604 607 671 921 944 快速直达专线178 夜30	1.018	21.660	Xicheng / Chaoyang
Andeli Beijie	安德里北街		60 82 142 380 409 夜36	1.274	22.934	Dongcheng
Gulou Dajie	鼓楼大街	2	27 44 60 82 200 380 409 夜20 夜36 专51	1.083	24.017	Dongcheng / Xicheng
Shichahai	什刹海		5 60 107 124 135 观光3	1.188	25.205	Dongcheng / Xicheng
Nanluogu Xiang	南锣鼓巷	6	3 4 13 60 82 118 612 夜2 夜3	0.902	26.107	Dongcheng
Zhongguo Meishuguan (National Art Museum)	中国美术馆		2 58 101 104 108 109 111 128 夜13	1.437	27.544	Dongcheng
Jinyu Hutong	金鱼胡同		103 141 观光2	0.873	28.417	Dongcheng
Wangfujing	王府井	1	1 1区 41 52 103 120 141 观光2 夜1 夜21	0.762	29.179	Dongcheng
Qianmen	前门	2	2 5 8 9 22 44 48 59 66 67 82 93 120 137 141 142 332 599 622 901快 观光1 观光2 夜2 夜5	1.857	31.036	Dongcheng
Zhushikou	珠市口	7	2 5 23 48 57 59 66 93 120 141 622 观光1 夜2 夜7	1.085	32.121	Dongcheng / Xicheng
Tianqiao	天桥		2 7 15 35 36 53 71 72 90 93 105 106 110 120 141 622 观光1 夜2 专155	0.881	33.002	Dongcheng / Xicheng
Yongdingmenwai	永定门外	14	2 7 24 25 40 71 72 93 120 622 849 997 BRT1(快速公交1) 夜2 专6 专202	1.800	34.802	Dongcheng
Muxi Yuan	木樨园		2 50 51 54 62 71 72 93 120 300 300快 324 368 497 622 665 678 679 687 820 827 839 848 849 943 954 957 973 997 BRT1(快速公交1) 夜2 夜23 夜24 夜30 专18 专130	0.741	35.543	Dongcheng
Haihutun	海户屯		54 71 622 678 687 827 BRT1(快速公交1) 夜2 专34	0.845	36.388	Fengtai
Dahong Men	大红门	10	54 343 622 687 827 BRT1(快速公交1) 快速直达专线16 专13 专34 专76 专163	0.853	37.241	Fengtai
Dahongmennan	大红门南		54 343 366 400 400快 485 501 511 602 622 685 687 825 827 829 990 BRT1(快速公交1) 夜2 专13 专163	0.825	38.066	Fengtai
Heyi	和义		54 366 485 501 622 685 827 BRT1(快速公交1) 夜2	2.446	40.512	Fengtai
Donggaodi	东高地		353 354 366 501 556 622 685 BRT1(快速公交1) 夜2	1.537	42.049	Fengtai
Huojian Wanyuan	火箭万源		576 680 BRT1(快速公交1)	1.215	43.264	Fengtai
Wufutang	五福堂		453 555 576 680 926 BRT1(快速公交1) 兴42 兴90	1.684	44.948	Daxing
Demao	德茂		453 555 926 兴29 专56	2.076	47.024	Daxing
Yinghai	瀛海		555 573 926 兴31 兴38 兴49区 兴63 兴72 兴74 兴75 兴80	1.510	48.534	Daxing

== History ==
Line 8 has been planned and built in several phases.

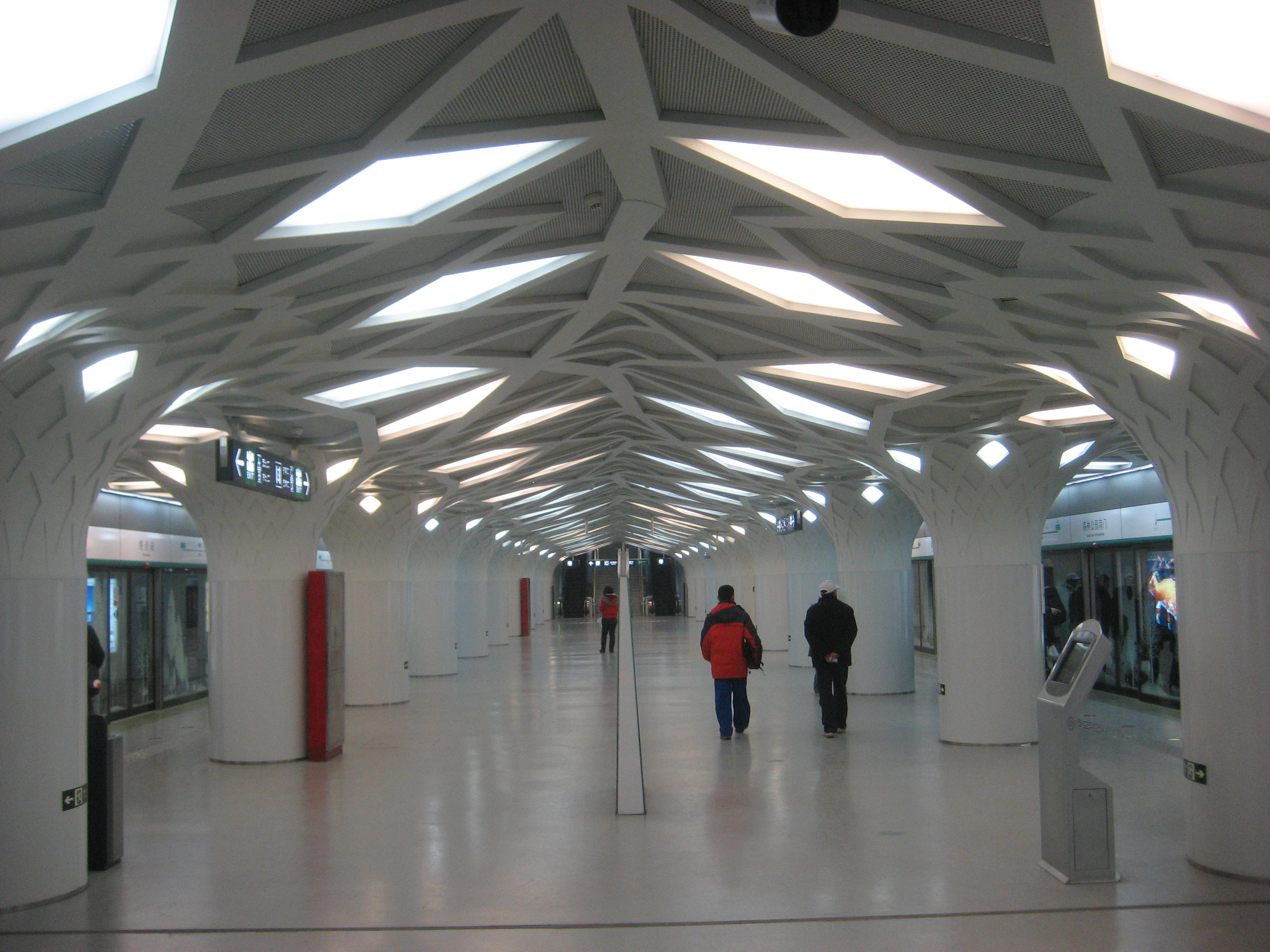
Forest motif inside the station

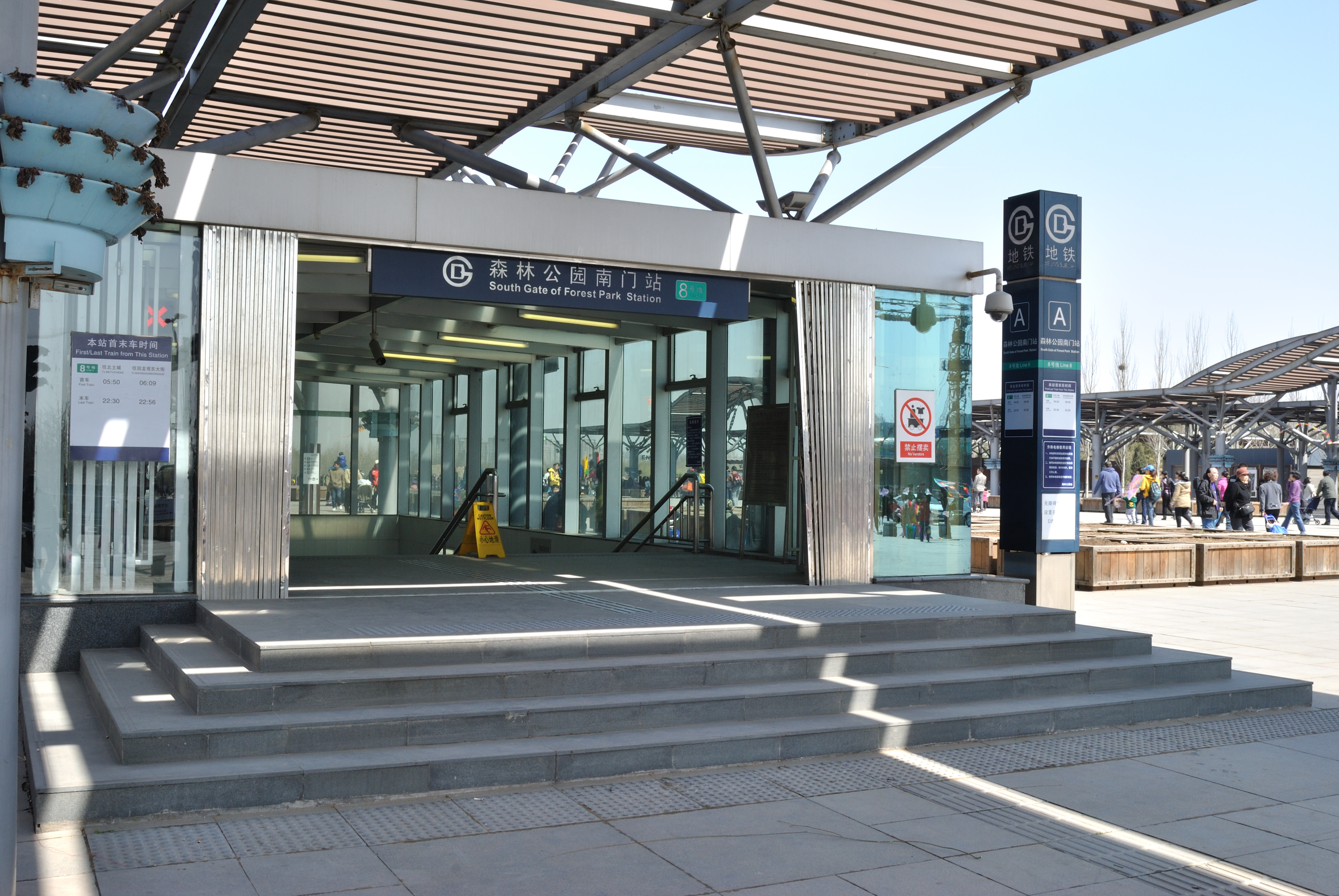
South Gate of Forest Park Station, Exit A

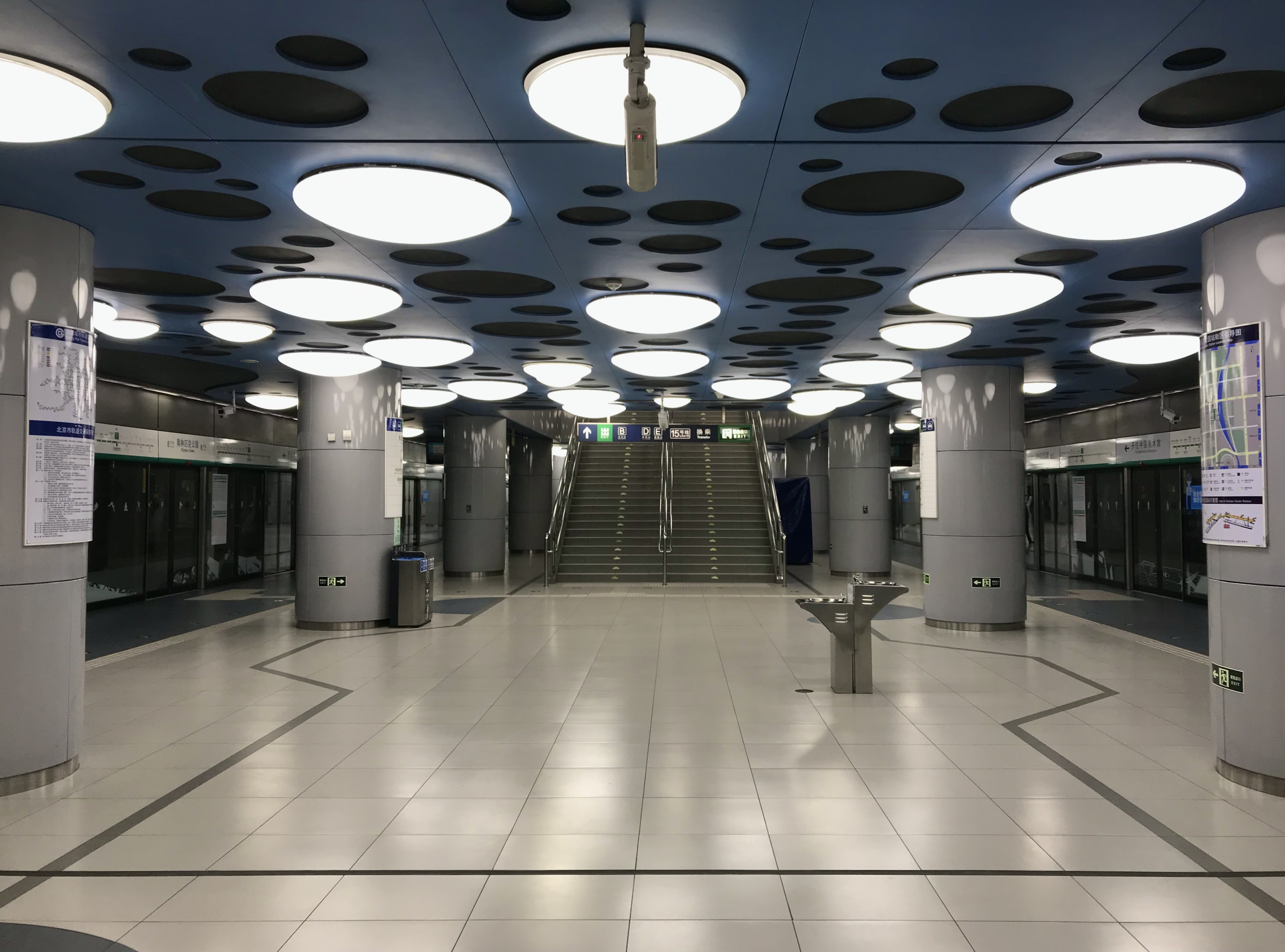
Olympic Green Station platform

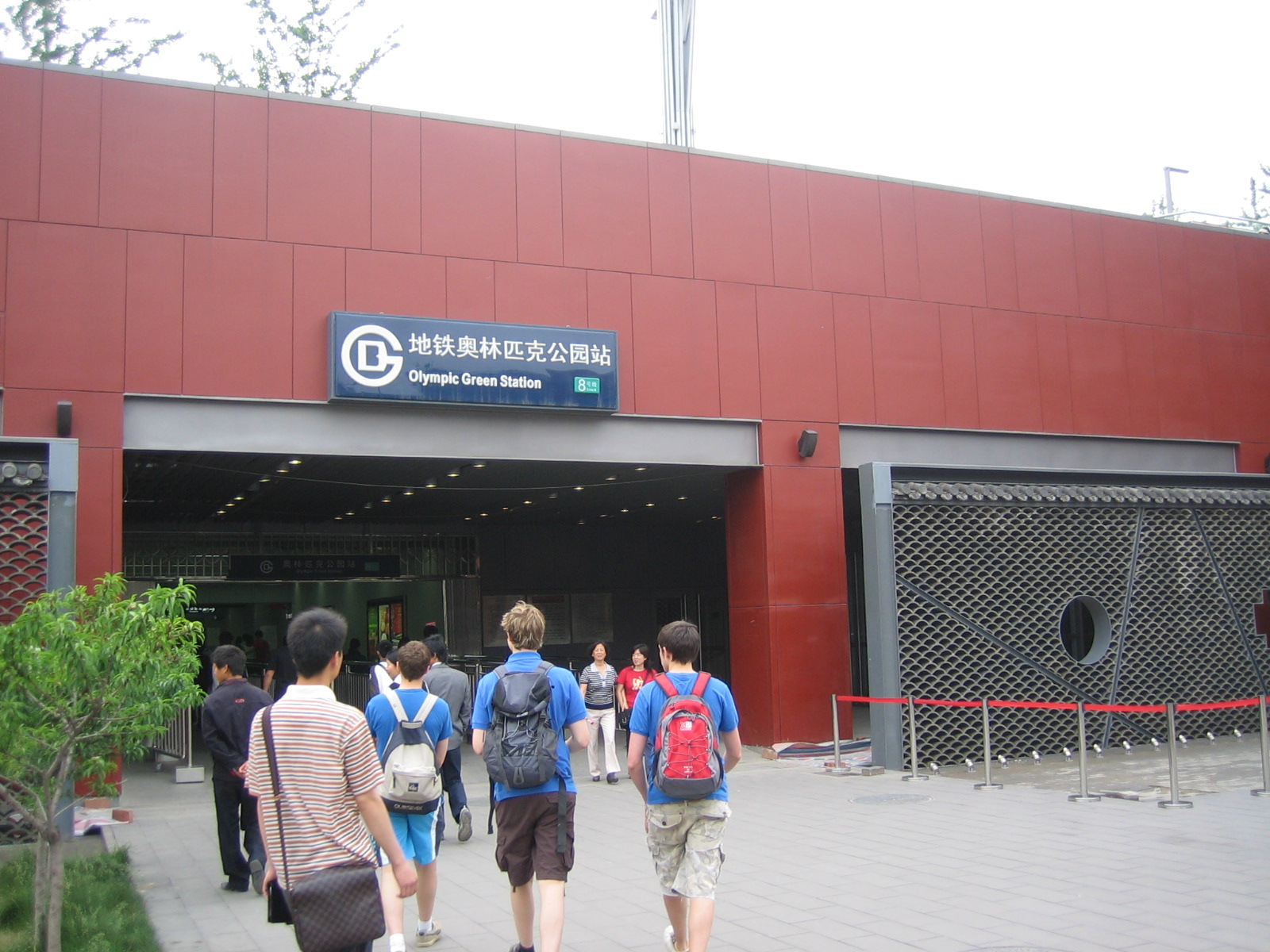
Olympic Green Station

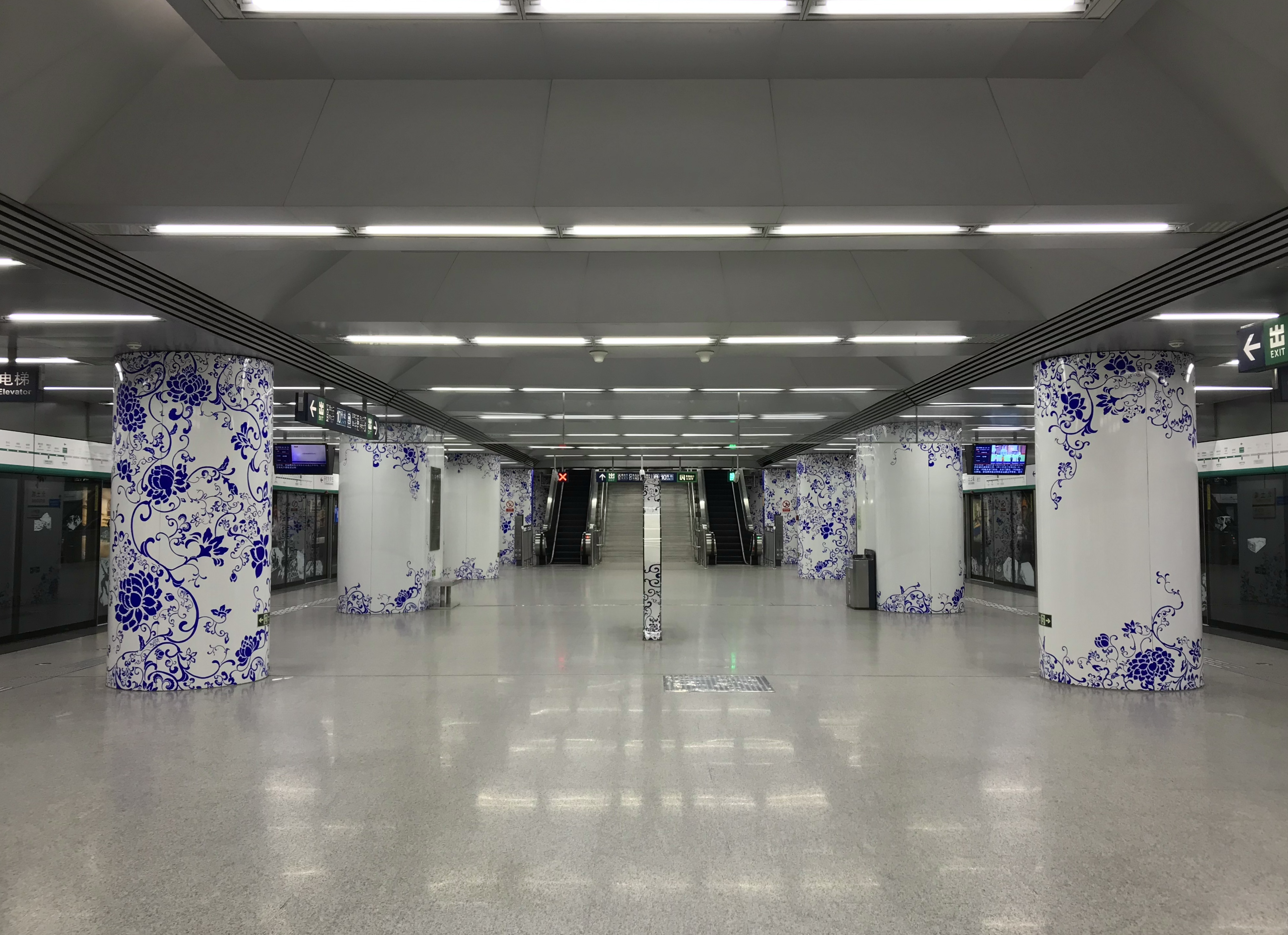
Beitucheng Station platform

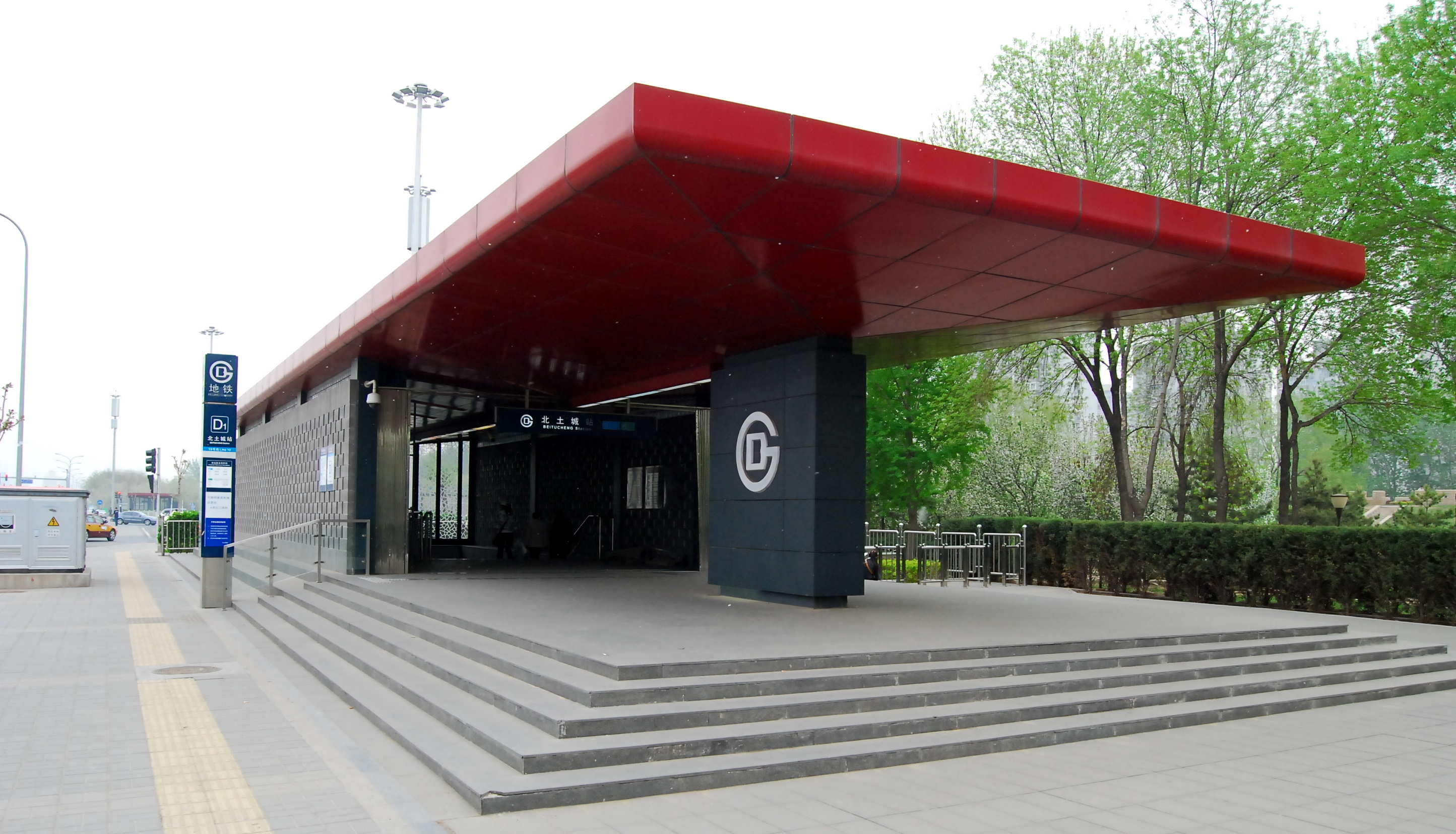
Beitucheng Station, Exit D1

=== Phase I (Olympic Branch Line) ===
Line 8 was planned as the subway line that follows Beijing's central north–south axis. The first section of Line 8 to be built was the four-station segment from Beitucheng to Forest Park South Gate, 4.35 km (2.703 mi) in length, that serves the Olympic Green. This section was included in Beijing's bid for the 2008 Summer Olympics, which was awarded to the city in 2001. Originally, Beijing's subway planners also considered building a subway extension line off of Line 13 or Line 5 to serve the Olympic Green but ultimately chose to build Line 8 as a branch off of Line 10. Construction began in 2004. With other Olympic venues also under construction, Phase I of Line 8 was built using the cut-and-cover method to reduce the difficulty of construction. The Olympic Branch Line, as Line 8 Phase I was known, entered into operation together with Line 10 on July 19, 2008. It serves the Olympic Green, located due north of the city centre, during the 2008 Summer Olympics. The Phase I only included 4 stations. Access was originally restricted to riders with an Olympic Register Card or a ticket to an event at the Olympic Games or Paralympic Games on the day of the event. In early October 2008, the line was fully opened to the public.

=== Phase II ===
On December 8, 2007, while Phase I of Line 8 was still under construction, work began on Phase II to extend Line 8 in both directions along the city's north–south central axis. Phase II was estimated to cost ¥10.1 billion and was scheduled to be completed by 2012.

==== Northern extension to Huilongguan Dongdajie ====
The northern extension to Huilongguan Dongdajie, 10.7 km (6.649 mi) in length with 6 stations, extended Line 8 from the South Gate of Forest Park to Huilongguan Dongdajie in Changping District beyond the Line 13 arc. Land clearing for Phase II began in December 2007. Tunnel boring machines began work on October 16, 2009. In the fall of 2011, the entire Line 8 shut down and the entire line including the Phase II northern extension reopened on December 31, 2011.

The Lincuiqiao station, just west of the Olympic Forest Park, was originally planned as an emergency stop, but was added at the behest of nearby residents and their municipal people's congress representative, Tian Yuan, who argued that the 5.1 km (3.169 mi) gap between South Gate of Forest Park and Yongtaizhuang made subway access inconvenient for residents along Lincui Road. Lincuiqiao was officially added as a station to Phase II plans in December 2008.

==== Southern extension to Guloudajie ====
The southern extension to Guloudajie, 3.28 km (2.04 mi) in length, opened on December 30, 2012. Travel time from Huilongguan to the Second Ring Road was reduced by a half-hour. Daily ridership reached 203,000 in March 2013.

=== Phase II sections opened at the end of 2013 ===
On December 28, 2013, Line 8 reached 26.614 km (16.537 mi) in length with the opening of the Changping-Line 8 Connector and the southern extension to Nanluoguxiang.

==== Changping-Line 8 Connector ====
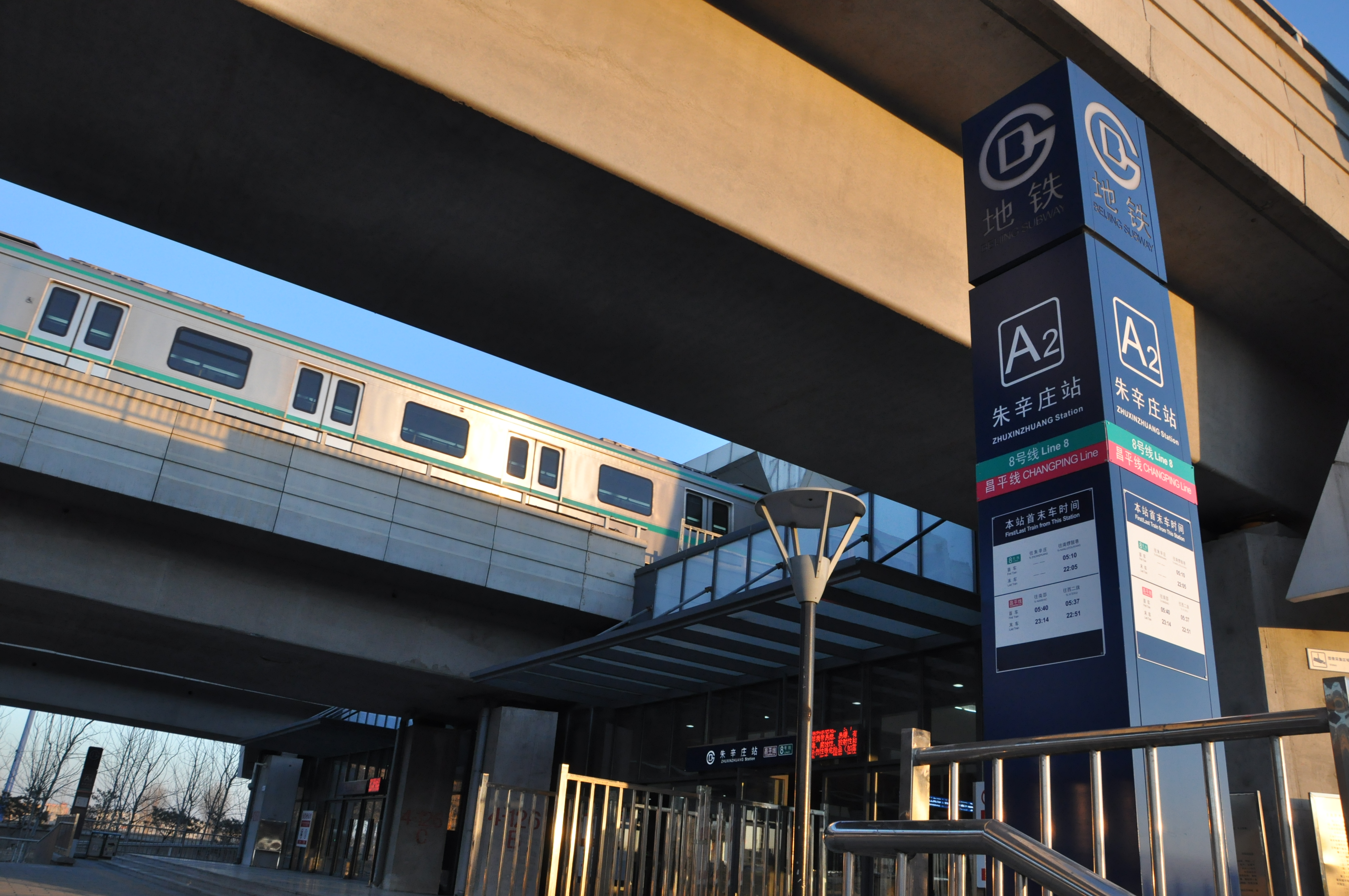
Line 8 train at the Zhuxinzhuang Station

The Changping-Line 8 Connector, also known as the Changba Connector Line (昌八联络线) or Changba Connector, is a 6.3-kilometre-long (3.9 mi) extension of Line 8 from Huilongguan Dongdajie to Zhuxinzhuang on the Changping Line. The Changba Connector contains three stations: Pingxifu, Yuzhilu and Zhuxinzhuang, and forms the northernmost section of Line 8. The Changba Connector was designed to alleviate passenger traffic on Line 13 by allowing Changping Line riders heading to destinations in eastern Beijing to switch to Line 8 at Zhuxinzhuang instead of transferring to Line 13 at Xi'erqi. The connector was built from April 2011 to September 2013 and entered operation at the end of 2013.

==== Southern extension to Nanluoguxiang ====
South of Guloudajie, Line 8 was extended a further 2.16 km (1.34 mi) through Shichahai station to Nanluogu Xiang station on December 28, 2013.

=== Phase II southern extension to National Art Museum ===
The one-station extension from Nanluoguxiang to National Art Museum was opened on 30 December 2018.

=== Phase III & IV ===
In Phase III & IV, Line 8 will be extended further south from the National Art Museum through Qianmen and Yongdingmen to beyond the southern 5th Ring Road. The line will veer to the east of the central axis to avoid passing under the Forbidden City and Tian'anmen Square, before returning to the central axis alignment at Qianmen.

Planning began in 2009. Plans of Line 8 in Phase III & IV showed 16 stations for 21.0 km (13.0 mi). Phase III includes 14 stations and Phase IV includes 2 stations, Demao and Yinghai. Phase III was scheduled to be built by 2015 but the commencement of construction was not set to begin until October 2013. The section from National Art Museum to Zhushikou started construction in November 2016.

On 30 December 2018, the southernmost section of Phase III, and Phase IV, from Zhushikou to Yinghai was opened (12 stations were opened, Dahong Men was not opened).

The section between National Art Museum and Zhushikou, which includes 3 stations (Jinyu Hutong, Wangfujing and Qianmen) opened on 31 December 2021.

On 8 November 2025, Dahong Men opened.

== Future Development ==
=== Through service with Changping line ===
Through service between Line 8 and Changping line via Zhuxinzhuang station is under planning.

=== Southern extension ===
A further southern extension from Yinghai to the China-Japan Innovation Cooperation Demonstration Zone is under planning. The extension is entirely in Daxing District of Beijing.

== Opening timeline ==
Segment	Commencement	Length	Station(s)	Name
Forest Park South Gate — Beitucheng	19 July 2008	3.583 km (2.23 mi)	3	Phase 1 (Olympic Branch line)
Olympic Sports Center	10 October 2008	Infill station	1	
Huilongguan Dongdajie — Forest Park South Gate	31 December 2011	10.700 km (6.65 mi)	6	Phase 2 (northern section)
Beitucheng — Gulou Dajie	30 December 2012	3.375 km (2.10 mi)	2	Phase 2 (1st southern section)
Gulou Dajie — Nanluogu Xiang	28 December 2013	2.090 km (1.30 mi)	2	Phase 2 (2nd southern section)
Zhuxinzhuang — Huilongguan Dongdajie	28 December 2013	6.359 km (3.95 mi)	3	Changping & Line 8 connector project
Andeli Beijie	26 December 2015	Infill station	1	
Nanluogu Xiang — National Art Museum	30 December 2018	1.88 km (1.17 mi)	1	Phase 2 (3rd southern section)
Zhushikou — Yinghai	30 December 2018	16.4 km (10.19 mi)	12	Phase 3 (southern section) & Phase 4
National Art Museum — Zhushikou	31 December 2021	4.3 km (2.67 mi)	3	Phase 3 (northern section)
Dahong Men	8 November 2025	Infill station	1	

== Rolling Stock ==
During the Olympics Line 8 borrowed DKZ15 trains from Line 10; after the opening of the first sections of Phase II new CSR Sifang Locomotive SFM12 trains dedicated to Line 8 were rolled out.

Model	Image	Manufacturer	Year built	Amount in service	Fleet numbers	Depot
SFM12		CRRC Qingdao Sifang; Beijing Subway Rolling Stock Equipment	2010	40	08 001–08 040	Pingxifu; Yinghai
SFM42		CRRC Qingdao Sifang; Beijing Subway Rolling Stock Equipment	2019	72	08 041–08 112	Pingxifu; Yinghai

== Sources ==
- 北京市城市轨道交通近期建设规划调整（2007～2016年）通过批准. 中华人民共和国国家发展和改革委员会 (in Chinese). 2012-11-16. Archived from the original on 2012-11-19.
- 地铁8号线三期拟年内开工. 京华时 (in Chinese). 2011-04-17. Archived from the original on 2013-10-31.
