= Yinghai station =

Beijing Subway station

Yinghai 瀛海
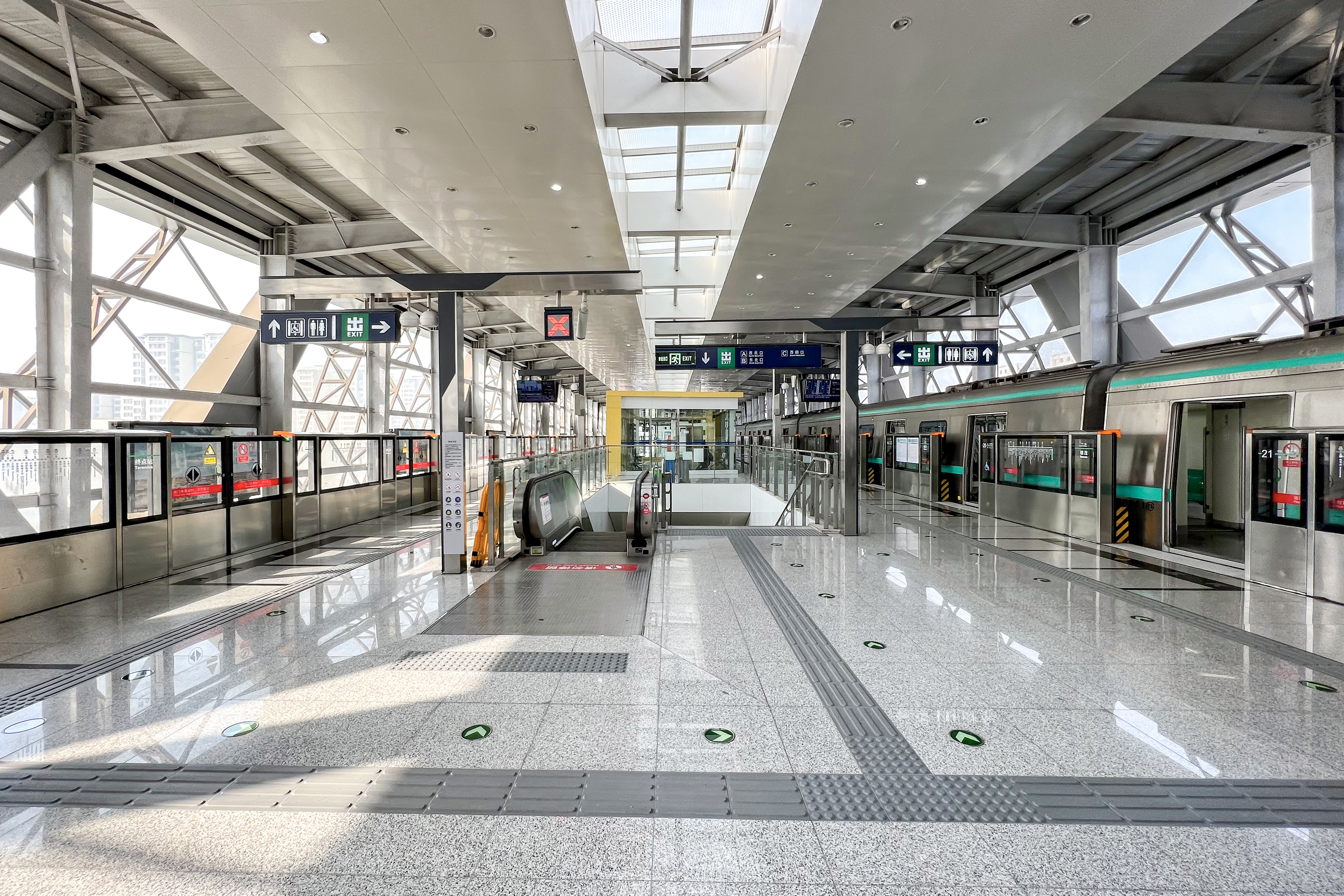
- Platform

General information
- Location: Yinghai, Daxing District, Beijing; China
- Coordinates: 39.759301°N 116.442778°E
- Operator: Beijing Mass Transit Railway Operation Corporation Limited
- Line: Line 8
- Platforms: 2 (1 island platform)
- Tracks: 2

Construction
- Structure type: Elevated
- Accessible: Yes

History
- Opened: December 30, 2018

Services
Preceding station	Beijing Subway	Following station
Demao towards Zhuxinzhuang	Line 8	Terminus
Location
- Location within Beijing

Yinghai station (Chinese: 瀛海站; pinyin: Yínghǎi zhàn) is a station on Line 8 of the Beijing Subway. It was opened on December 30, 2018.

== Station layout ==
The station has an elevated island platform.

== Exits ==
There are 4 exits, lettered A, B1, B2, and C. Exits A and B1 are accessible.
