= Panjiayuan =

Panjiayuan (Chinese: 潘家园) may refer to:

- Panjiayuan Subdistrict, Chaoyang, Beijing
- Panjiayuan Station on line 10 of the Beijing Subway
- Beijing Antique Market, Chaoyang, Beijing
