= Panjiayuanxi station =

Beijing Subway Line 17 station

Panjiayuanxi 潘家园西
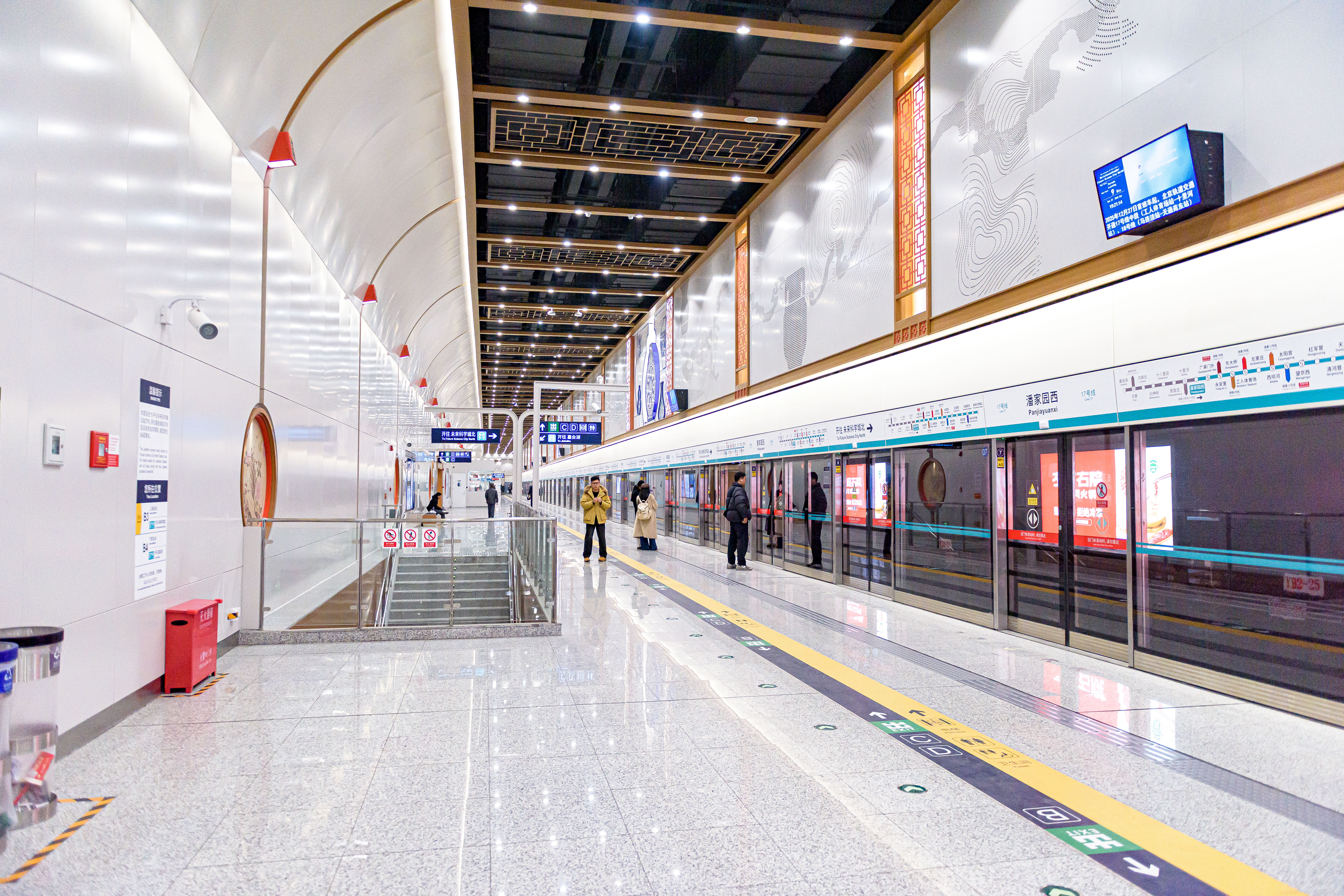
- Northbound (upper level) platform

Chinese name
- Simplified Chinese: 潘家园西站
- Traditional Chinese: 潘家園西站
Transcriptions
Standard Mandarin
- Hanyu Pinyin: Pānjiāyuánxī zhàn

General information
- Location: South side of the intersection of Panjiayuan Road (潘家园路) and Panjiayuan East Road (潘家园东路); Panjiayuan Subdistrict, Chaoyang District, Beijing; China
- Coordinates: 39°52′25.94″N 116°26′41″E
- Operator: Beijing MTR
- Line: Line 17
- Platforms: 2 (2 stacked side platforms)
- Tracks: 2

Construction
- Structure type: Underground
- Accessible: Yes

History
- Opened: December 27, 2025; 7 months ago

Services
Preceding station	Beijing Subway	Following station
Yong'an Li towards Weilaikexuechengbei (Future Science City North)	Line 17	Shilihe towards Jiahuihu
Future services
Guangqumen Wai towards Weilaikexuechengbei (Future Science City North)	Line 17	Shilihe towards Jiahuihu
Route map
Location
- Location within Beijing

Panjiayuanxi station (simplified Chinese: 潘家园西站; traditional Chinese: 潘家園西站; pinyin: Pānjiāyuánxī Zhàn) is a station on Line 17 of the Beijing Subway. It opened on December 27, 2025.

The station once temporarily suspended construction works due to concerns about the structural safety of nearby residential buildings, before resuming sometime after.

== Station features ==
The station has an underground set of two stacked side platforms. It also has a mural called "National Beauty and Elegance", which was installed above the screen doors of the upper platform in the direction of Weilaikexuechengbei (Future Science City North).

Exit B of the station has an integrated design with the Panjiayuan community comprehensive service room.

=== Exits ===
There are 3 exits, lettered B, C, and D. All exits lead to Panjiayuan East Road. Exit D is accessible via elevator.

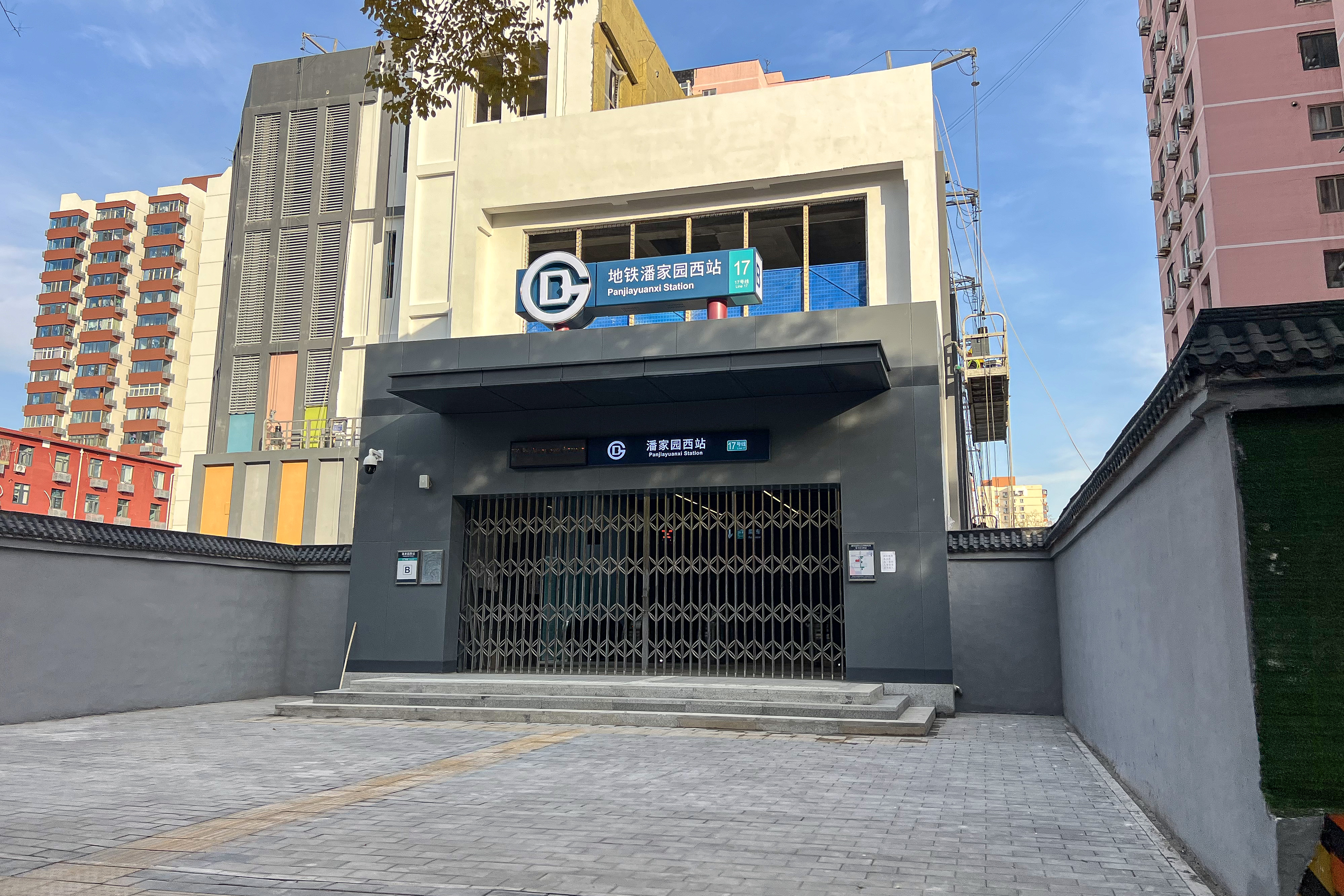
Exit B

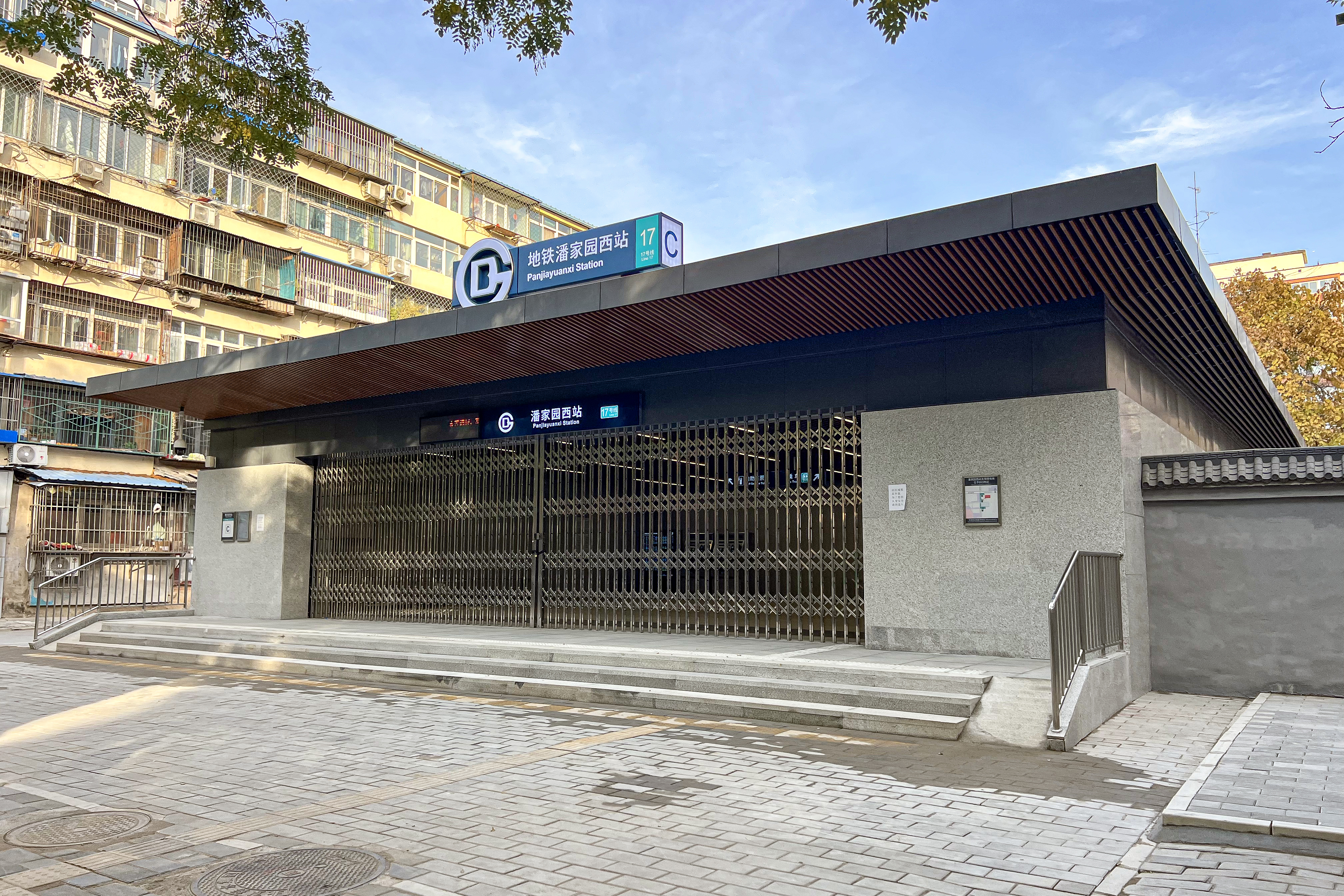
Exit C

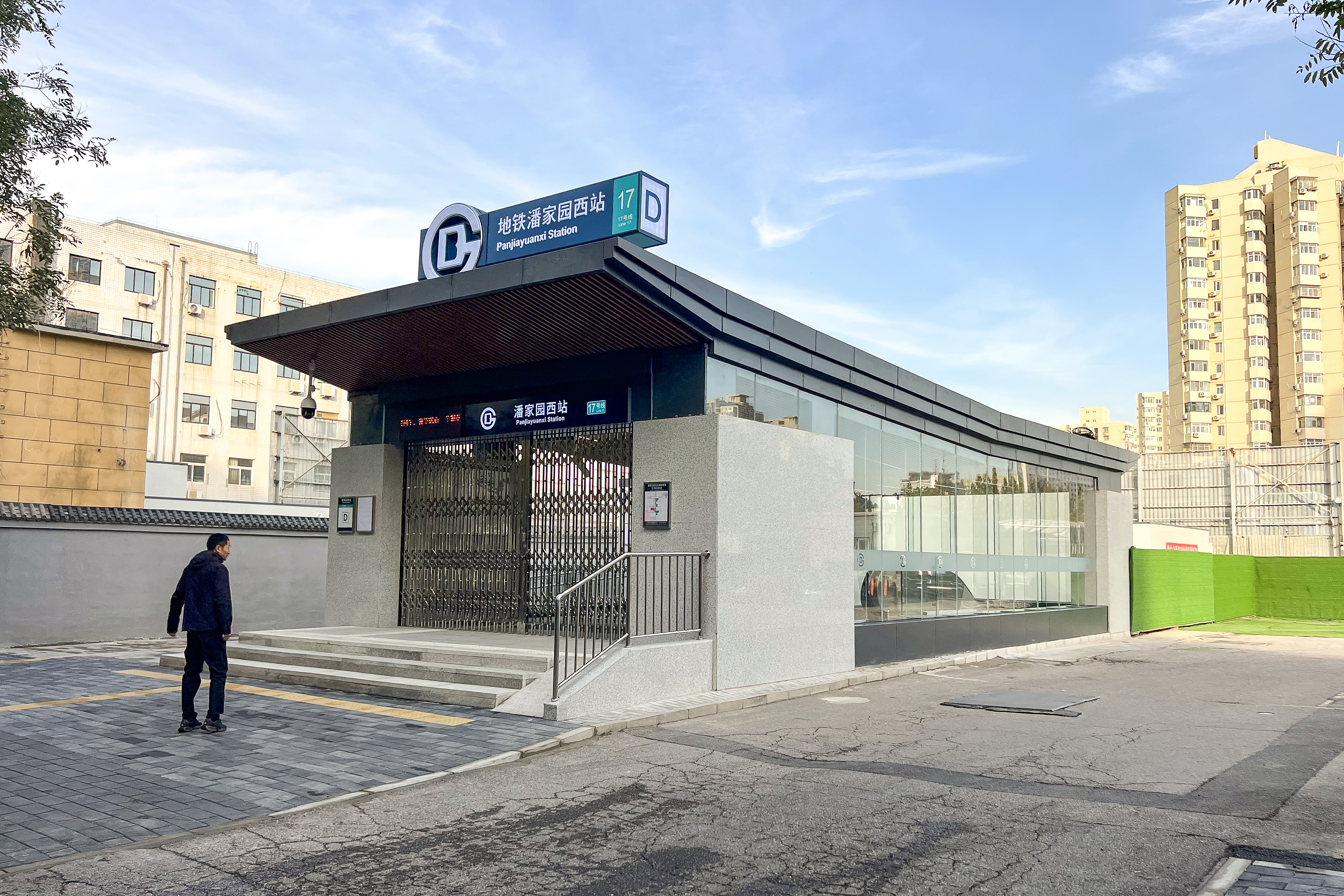
Exit D

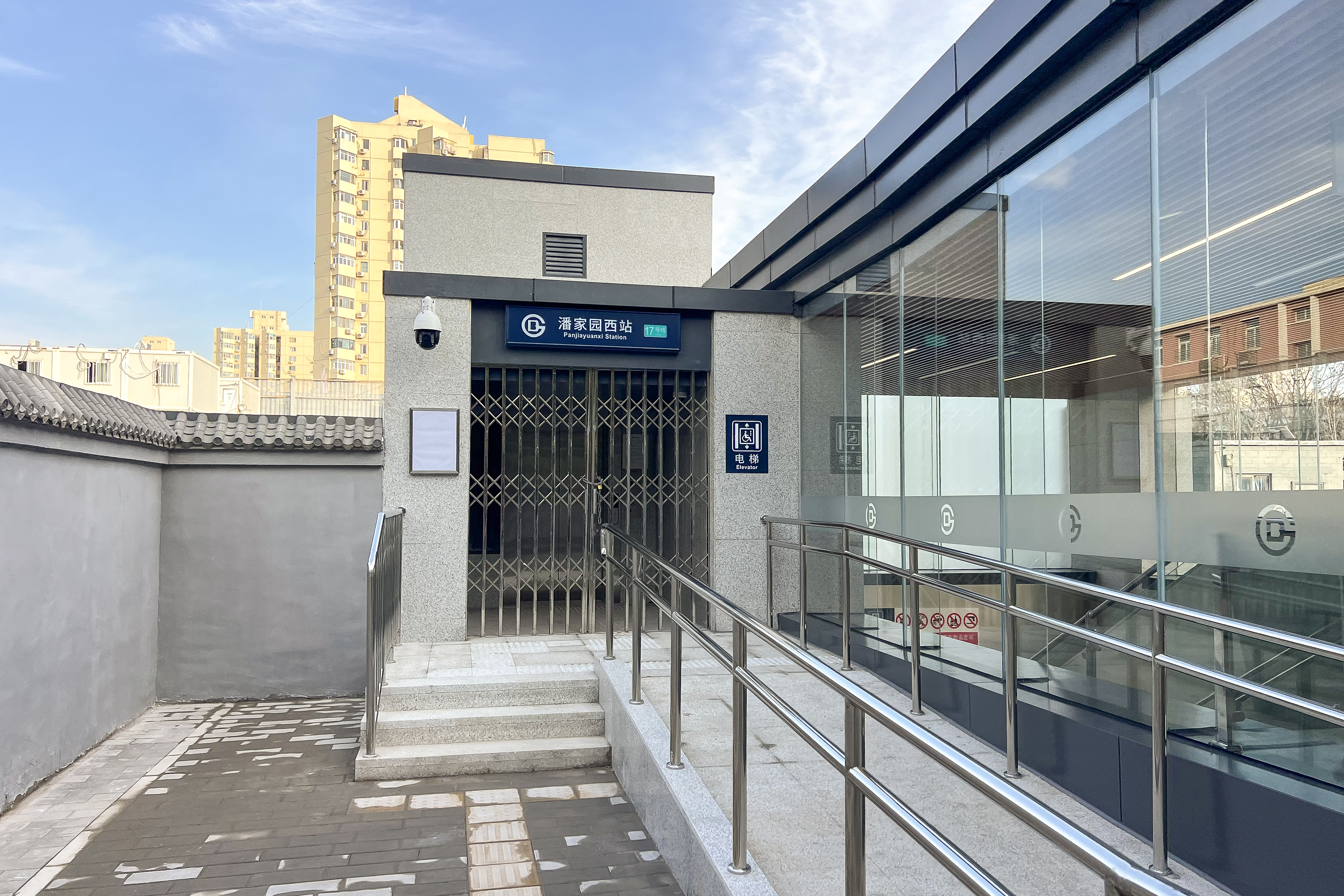
Elevator of Exit D
