= Guangqumen Nei station =

Beijing Subway station

Guangqumen Nei 广渠门内
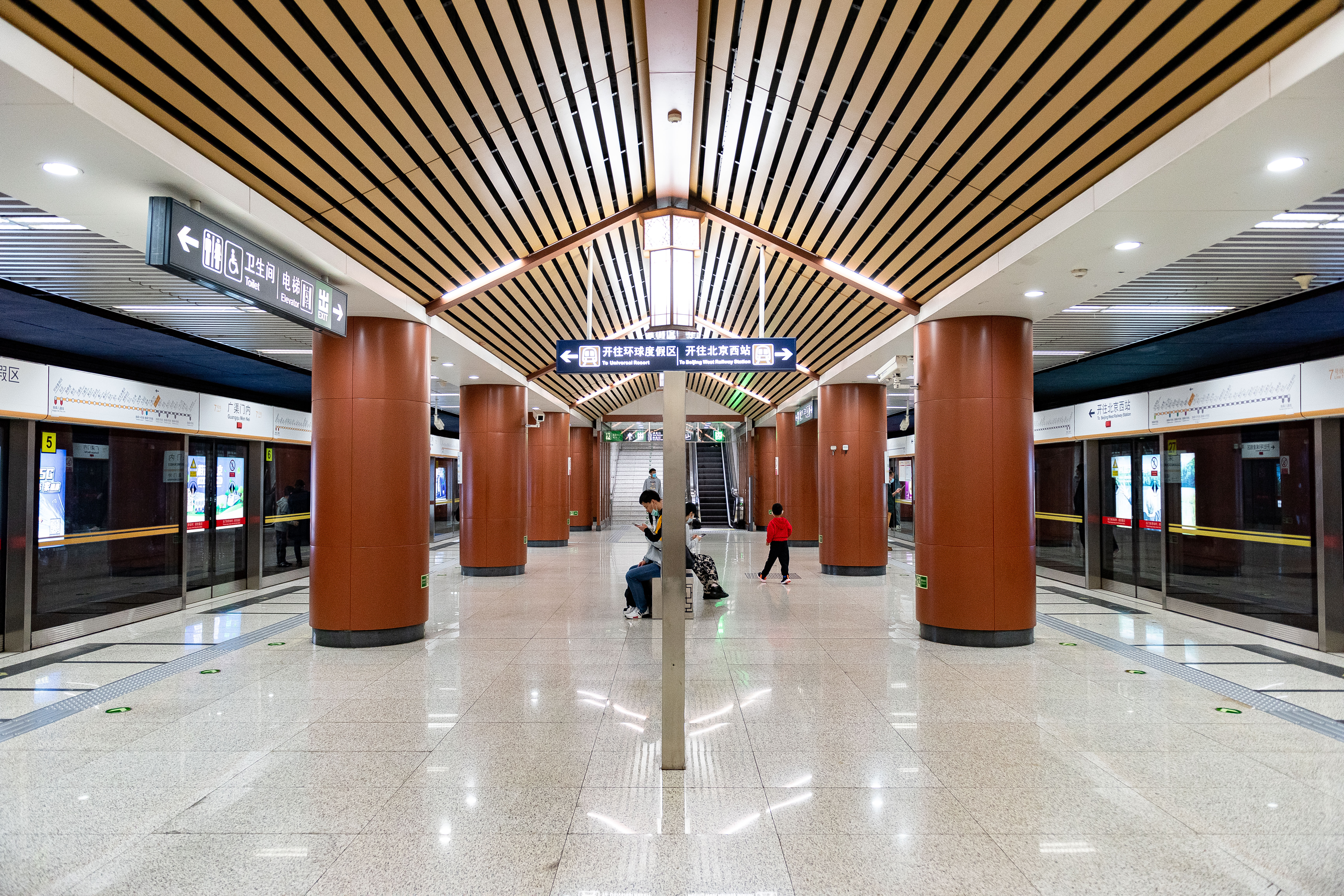
- Platform

General information
- Location: Guangqumen Inner Street; Donghuashi Subdistrict, Dongcheng District, Beijing; China
- Coordinates: 39.892140°N 116.427299°E
- Operator: Beijing Mass Transit Railway Operation Corporation Limited
- Line: Line 7
- Platforms: 2 (1 island platform)
- Tracks: 2

Construction
- Structure type: Underground
- Accessible: Yes

History
- Opened: December 28, 2014; 11 years ago

Services
Preceding station	Beijing Subway	Following station
Ciqi Kou towards Beijing West railway station	Line 7	Guangqumenwai towards Universal Resort
Location
- Location within Beijing

Guangqumen Nei Station (simplified Chinese: 广渠门内站; traditional Chinese: 廣渠門內站; pinyin: Guǎngqúmén Nèi Zhàn) is a station on Line 7 of the Beijing Subway. It was opened on December 28, 2014 as a part of the stretch between Beijing West railway station and Jiaohuachang and is located between Ciqikou and Guangqumenwai.

== Station layout ==
The station has an underground island platform.

== Exits ==
There are 3 exits, lettered A, B, and D. Exits A and D are accessible.
