= Guangqumen Wai station =

Beijing Subway Line 7 and Line 17 station

Guangqumen Wai 广渠门外
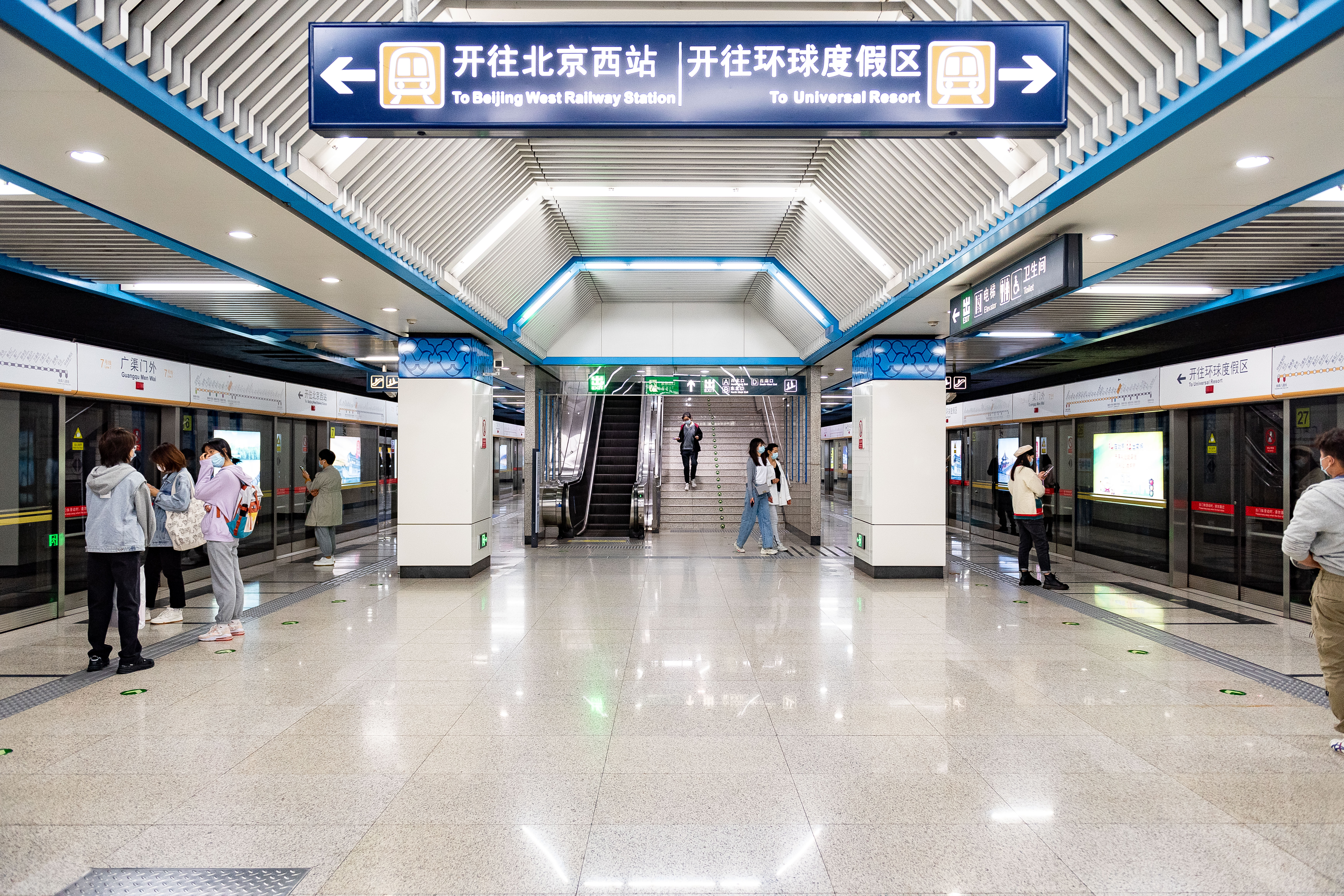
- Platform

General information
- Location: Guangqumen Outer Street and Guangheli Middle Street (广和里中街) / Guangqumenbei 4th Alley (广渠门北四巷); Dongcheng District / Chaoyang District border, Beijing; China
- Coordinates: 39.8934°N 116.4472°E
- Operator: Beijing Mass Transit Railway Operation Corporation Limited (Line 7); Beijing MTR (Line 17)
- Lines: Line 7; Line 17 (future)
- Platforms: 4 (2 island platforms)
- Tracks: 4

Construction
- Structure type: Underground
- Accessible: Yes

History
- Opened: Line 7: December 28, 2014; 11 years ago; Line 17: To be determined

Services
Preceding station	Beijing Subway	Following station
Guangqumen Nei towards Beijing West railway station	Line 7	Shuangjing towards Universal Resort
Line 17 does not stop here
Future services
Yong'an Li towards Weilaikexuechengbei (Future Science City North)	Line 17	Panjiayuanxi towards Jiahuihu
Location
- Location within Beijing

Guangqumen Wai station (simplified Chinese: 广渠门外站; traditional Chinese: 廣渠門外站; pinyin: Guǎngqúmén Wài Zhàn) is an interchange station between Line 7 and Line 17 of the Beijing Subway. The Line 7 station opened on December 28, 2014. The Line 17 station is expected to open in tandem with the Majuan Public Transport Hub (Chinese: 马圈交通枢纽).

== Timetable ==
- Beijing West Railway Station — Universal Resort
  - The first train 5:50
  - The last train 23:35
- Universal Resort — Beijing West Railway Station
  - The first train 5:33
  - The last train 22:48

== Station layout ==
The station has underground island platforms for both Line 7 and Line 17.

== History ==
=== Line 7 ===
The Line 7 station opened on December 28, 2014 as a part of the stretch between Beijing West railway station and Jiaohuachang and is located between Guangqumen Nei to the west and Shuangjing to the east.

=== Line 17 ===
The Line 17 station and the Majuan Public Transport Hub (Chinese: 马圈交通枢纽) will be completed in 2029. In the initial opening of the Line 17 middle section on December 27, 2025, trains will not stop at this station until the transport hub is complete.

== Exits ==
=== Line 7 ===
There are 3 exits, lettered A, B, and D. Exit B is accessible via a stairlift.

=== Line 17 ===
There are 3 exits, lettered F1, F2, and G.

== Gallery ==
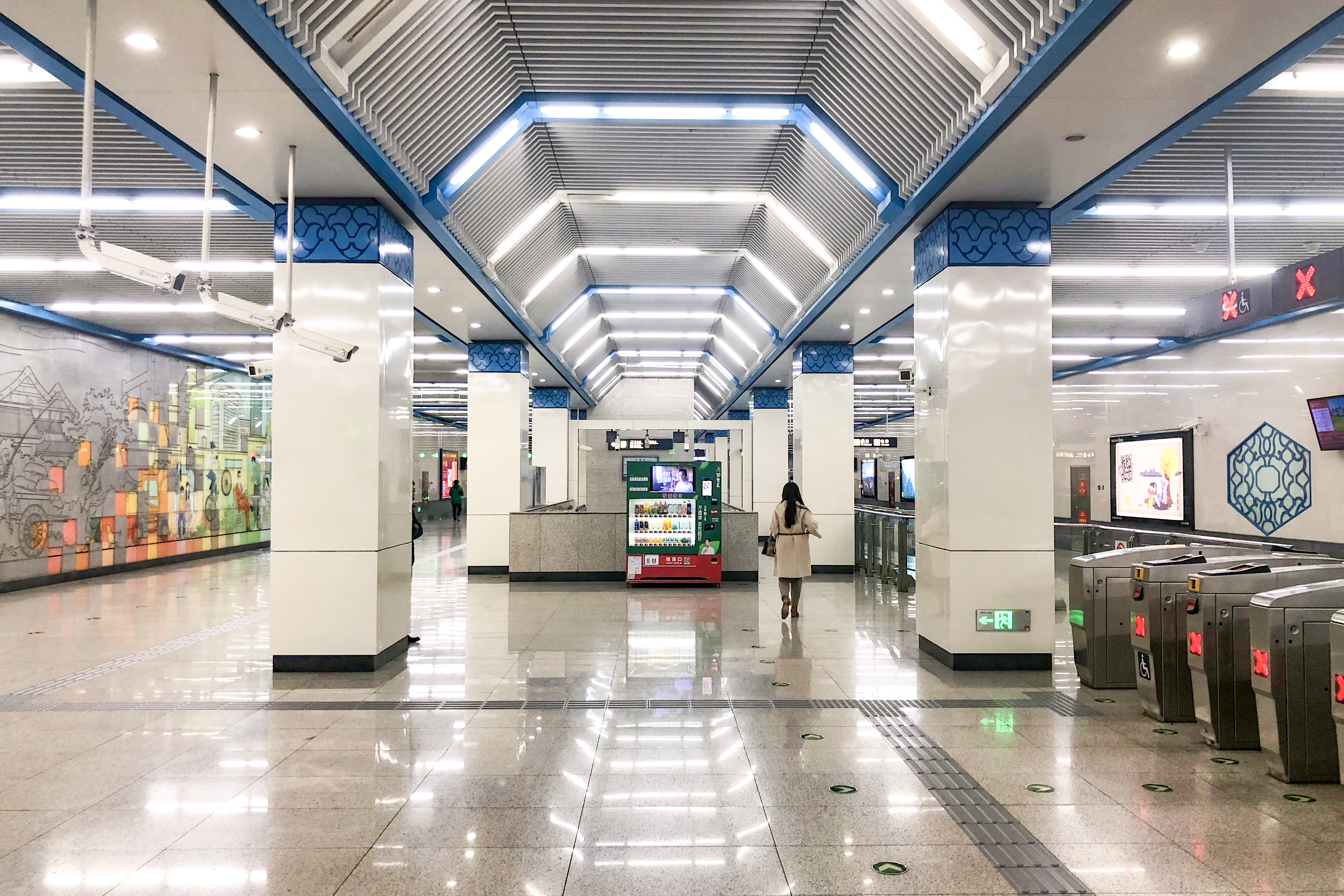
Concourse
