= Xinfadi Market =

Wholesale market in Fengtai, Beijing

Coordinates: 39°48′42″N 116°20′04″E

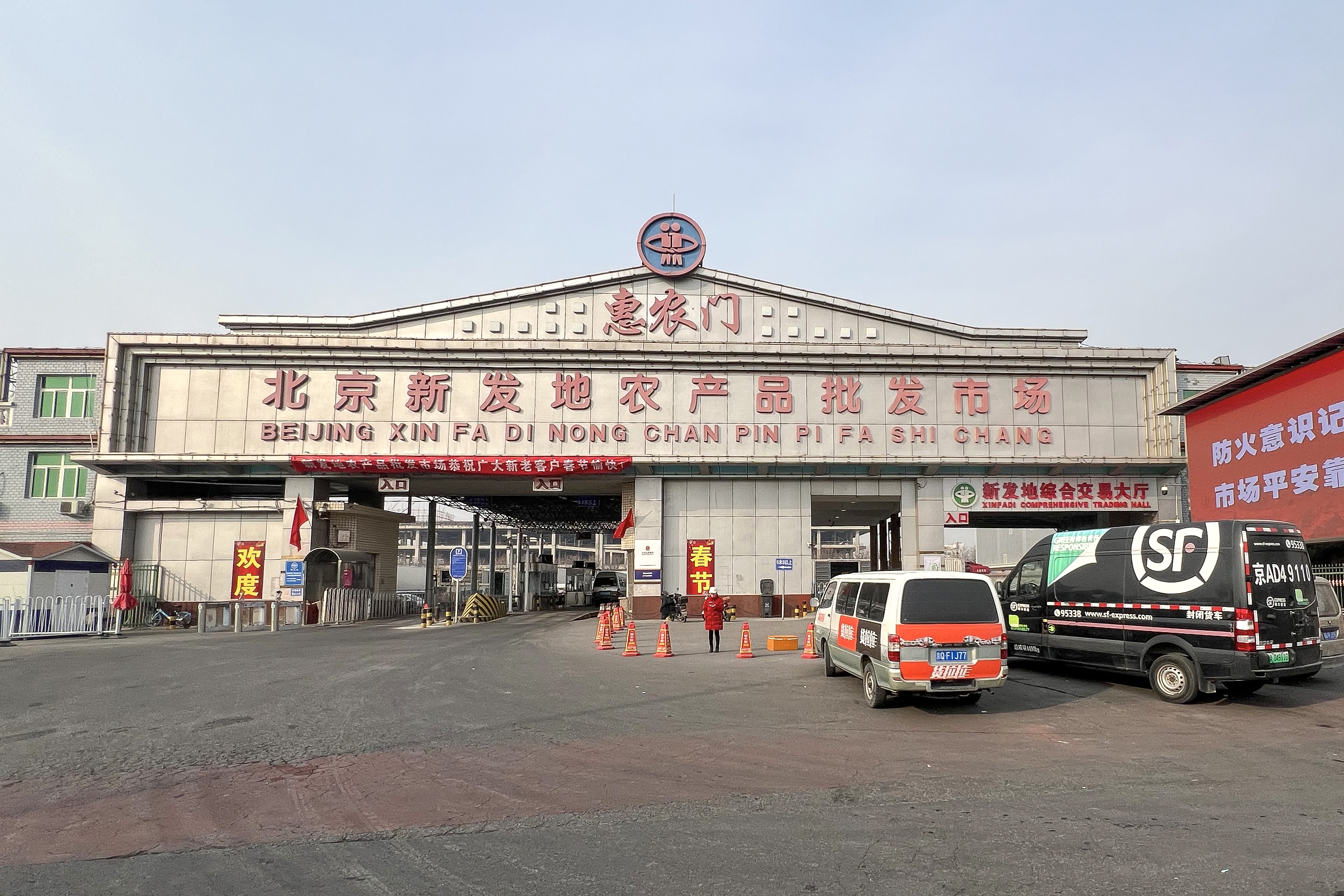
- Front entrance to the Xinfadi market as it appeared in February 2024
- Simplified Chinese: 北京新发地农产品批发市场
- Traditional Chinese: 北京新發地農產品批發市場
Transcriptions
Standard Mandarin
- Hanyu Pinyin: Běijīng Xīnfādì Nóngchǎnpǐn Pīfā Shìchǎng

Xinfadi Market (Chinese: 北京新发地农产品批发市场, Beijing Xinfadi Agricultural Products Wholesale Market) is a covered wholesale food market in the southern Beijing district of Fengtai. As of 2020, the market provides more than 90% of Beijing's fruits and vegetables according to state media. Seafood and meat are also sold at the market. Vendors distribute produce from Xinfadi to many smaller markets in Beijing. It is nicknamed the "vegetable basket" and "fruit bowl" of the city.

Xinfadi Market opened on May 16, 1988. It has been renovated at least once in its lifetime. In 2017, it covered an area of 112 hectares. It is the largest wholesale food market in Beijing, with three floors above ground and two underground in 2018. It was the largest wholesale food market in Asia, with as of 2020 more than 10,000 workers including 1,500 managers and over 4,000 tenants. According to the official site in 2020, more than 20,000 tons of fruit, 18,000 tons of vegetables, and 1,500 tons of seafood are sold at the market each day. There is a "beef and lamb trading hall", and poultry meat is also sold on the premises. "The Xinfadi Market is more of a one-stop-shop where wholesalers in the city would purchase vegetables, meat and seafood hall after hall."

The market was responsible in 2016 for 70% of Beijing's fresh vegetables, more than 80% of Beijing's fresh food and drinks, and all of the city's imported fruit. Every year, 14 million tons of products are sold at the market for an estimated 50 billion RMB.

== History ==
In the last years of the 20th century, Beijing was home to four major food markets: Xinfadi, Yuegezhuang Market (1986), Dazhongsi Market (1986) and Sidaokou Market. Tongxian County latterly set up a market as part of a "new national network of Central wholesale markets", after the 1985 liberalization of trade.

=== Background and establishment ===
Xinfadi Village, where the market is located, was originally named "Xinfendi" (simplified Chinese: 新坟地; traditional Chinese: 新墳地; pinyin: Xīnféndì, literally "new grave land"), because in 1958 a graveyard located there was leveled to create farmland. The area gradually turned into a settlement, and the name was changed to "Xinfadi" (roughly "newly developed land"). The village mainly contains sandy, loamy, brown soil, suitable for planting vegetables.

On May 10, 1985, the Beijing Bureau of Commodity Prices decided to relax control of the prices of seven key agricultural products: pork, beef, mutton, eggs, poultry, marine fish, and vegetables. On May 30, the municipal Party committee and city government convened a vegetable work conference and decided to "revitalize buying and selling" and "allow food from other parts of the country to come into Beijing". As a result, after farmers from near Xinfadi Village handed over the required quantity of vegetables to the government, they began to set up roadside stands to sell the remainder. These stands gradually turned into a street market.

Over time, many farmers from outside Beijing joined the street market, resulting in disorganized commerce and traffic jams. Local officials repeatedly tried to drive them out, without success, so a member of the Fengtai District Bureau of Industry and Commerce recommended that a wholesale market be established in the village, welcoming the farmers instead of trying to remove them. Xinfadi Village Vegetable Company manager Zhang Yuxi (Chinese: 张玉玺; pinyin: Zhāng Yùxǐ) decided to build a market. On May 16, 1988, 15 villagers, led by Zhang, used wire netting to enclose one hectare in Xinfadi Village. They used 150,000 yuan of funding (50,000 each from the district, township, and village) to establish a farmers' market. In the early days of the market, Zhang, who lacked experience setting up a marketplace, personally sold vegetables in Jining, Zhangjiakou, Luohe, and other places.

=== Growth ===
By 1989, the area used by Xinfadi Market grew to 1.7 hectares; in 1992, it grew to nearly 7 ha; and in 1999, it grew to close to 70 ha. During this continual growth, Xinfadi Market used low fees and simple procedures to attract customers, and on holidays they did not charge administrative fees. The number of transactions gradually grew, and in 1996 the market's vegetable sales exceeded 1.1 billion kilograms, representing 40% of vegetable sales in Beijing. The market's scope also expanded to include eight categories: vegetables, fruits, grains, oil, meat, seafood, eggs, and condiments. In 2003 the market accounted for 60% of Beijing's vegetable trade. In 2003, Xinfadi Village established 19 residential buildings, dubbed "Xinfadi Executive Paradise" (Chinese: 新发地经营者乐园), to provide housing for managers at Xinfadi Market who were from other places. In 2004, non-market businesses started to move in.

In 2006, 50 individual butcher stallholders sold roughly 200 kilograms of meat each per day. An independent observer said that he saw health inspection certifications on both the stalls and the displayed carcasses.

In 2010, Xinfadi Market occupied 100 hectares, with transactions worth 36 billion RMB.

As of 2016, the market covered 121 hectares (230 hectares including the "service area" with hotels, restaurants, and other establishments that serve the market).

The 2017 renovation plan, which was budgeted for $220 million, planned for the market's area to be reduced to 68 hectares.

=== COVID-19 outbreak ===
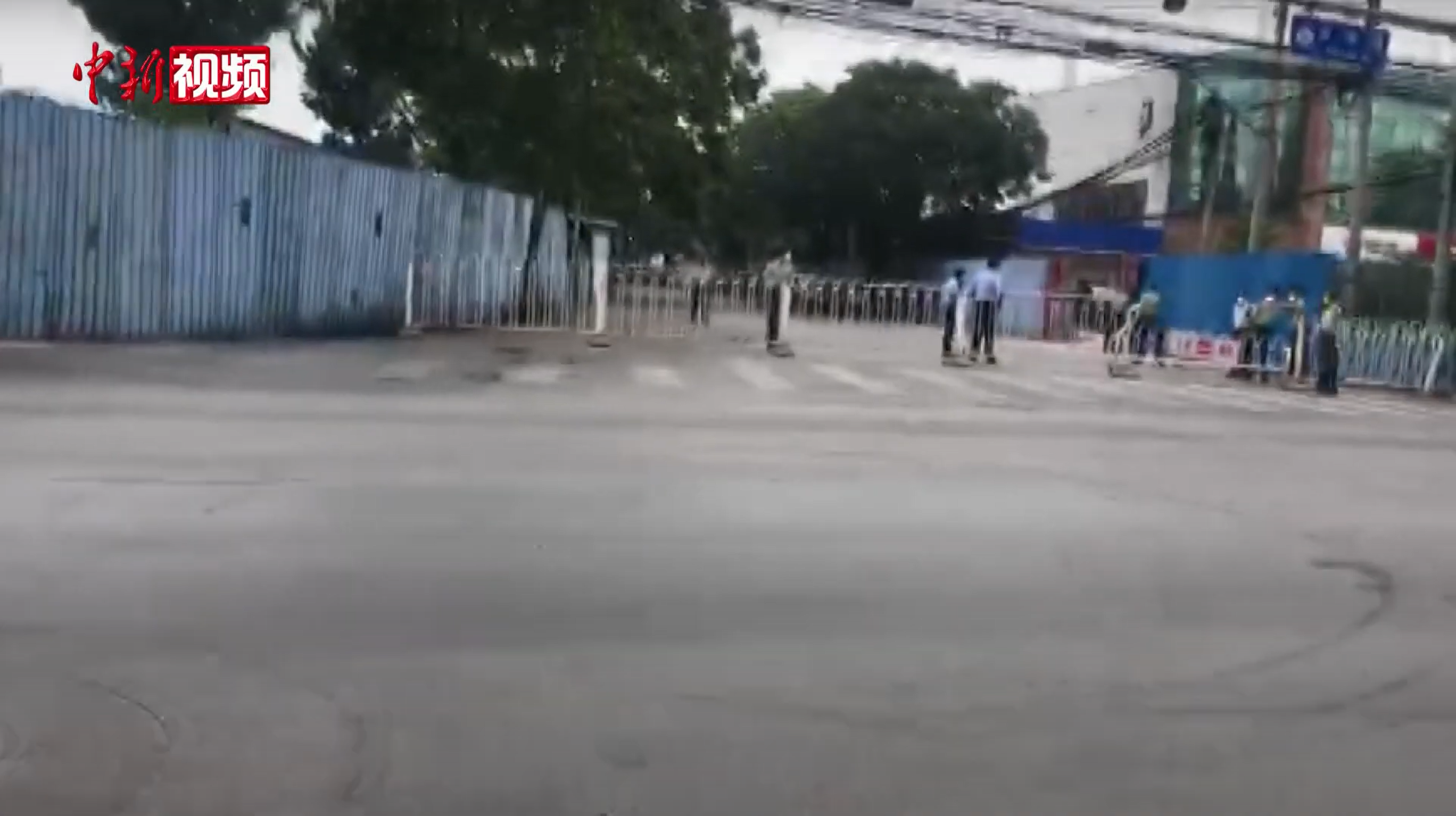
Lockdown near Xinfadi market, 13 June 2020

On June 13, 2020 at 03:00, the public health authority temporarily closed the Xinfadi market due to a COVID-19 outbreak. A "wartime mechanism" was put in place. Beijing CCP Party Secretary Cai Qi, city leaders Zhang Yankun, Du Feijin, Chen Yong, Wei Xiaodong, Cui Shuqiang, Wang Ning, Lu Yan, Yang Jinbai, Qi Yanjun, and secretary general of the municipal government Jin Wei participated in this decision.

Mass popular testing at the market in week 20 "detected more than 50 new infections". Tourism to the capital has been curtailed as a result, as well as sporting events. Cai said on 13 June that "We must ponder our pains, draw lessons from it, and always tighten the string of epidemic prevention and control." The authorities, who had been urged by the CCP "to act decisively", had found over the previous two days "confirmed cases and positive infections via nucleic acid testing for two consecutive days" as of the morning of 13 June. Analysis from 40 environmental samples also tested positive for COVID-19. It was reported that workers in the market and local residents were required to undergo PCR testing. People who had been to the market since 30 May were required to receive COVID-19 tests. During the weekend of 13 June, soldiers were seen in full uniform trooping in lock step to control the marketplace.

Eleven neighbourhoods near the market were put under lockdown to control the outbreak. Officials announced that they would arrange temporary stands to sell fruits and vegetables, so that produce would still be available in Beijing while the market was closed.

On 15 June, 27 new cases were reported in Beijing, bringing the city's total to 106 since the previous Friday. Lockdowns were declared in residential communities surrounding the market. Authorities barred residents of high-risk areas from leaving Beijing. Taxi services were barred from bringing Beijing residents out of the city.

On 16 June, the government closed all schools in Beijing, as Cai described as "extremely grave". On 17 June, government cancelled 1,000 airplane flights, although the Civil Aviation Administration of China had yet to declare public notice.

On 19 June an official said that "the majority of samples collected from the aquatic and soybean product areas at the market have tested positive for COVID19". As of 20 June, the authorities had sealed off 40 communities in Beijing, and told residents "not to leave their homes to avoid cross infection". Dayanglu Market halted its retail business on 21 June. There are 3,061 vendors in Dayanglu, "whose meat, poultry and egg transactions account 50% of the city's total."
