= Dayanglu Market =

Market in Beijing, China

Dayanglu Market (simplified Chinese: 大洋路市场; traditional Chinese: 大洋路市場; pinyin: Dàyáng Lù Shìchǎng) is a wholesale and retail food market in Beijing. In June 2020, there were 3,061 vendors in the market, "whose meat, poultry and egg transactions account 50% of the city's total", according to one report. As of June 2020, the market had a meat hall, a poultry hall, a fruit hall and a seafood hall.

The market is located in Panjiayuan (South East Third Ring Road) at Zhouzhuanglu (East of Shilihe bridge on East Third Ring Road), Shibalidian, Chaoyang District, Beijing. The market has a 45,000 cubic meter cold storage just for bananas.

== History ==
On one day in November 2003, Dayanglu's inventory numbered 109 varieties of vegetable.

On 21 June 2020, the retail business in Dayanglu was halted amid the Xinfadi Market outbreak of COVID-19.
