= Yong'an Li station =

Beijing Subway Line 1 and Line 17 station

Yong'an Li 永安里
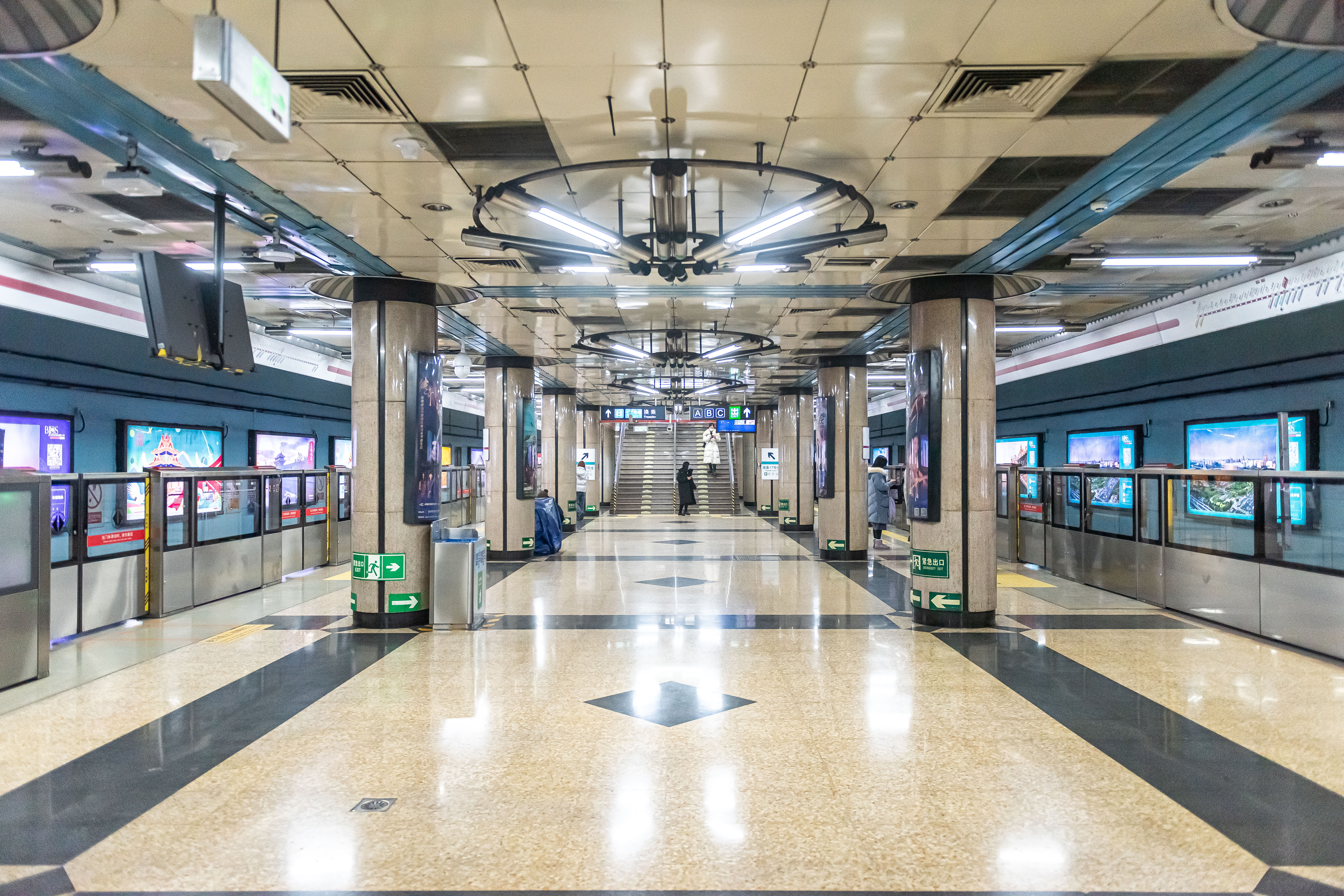
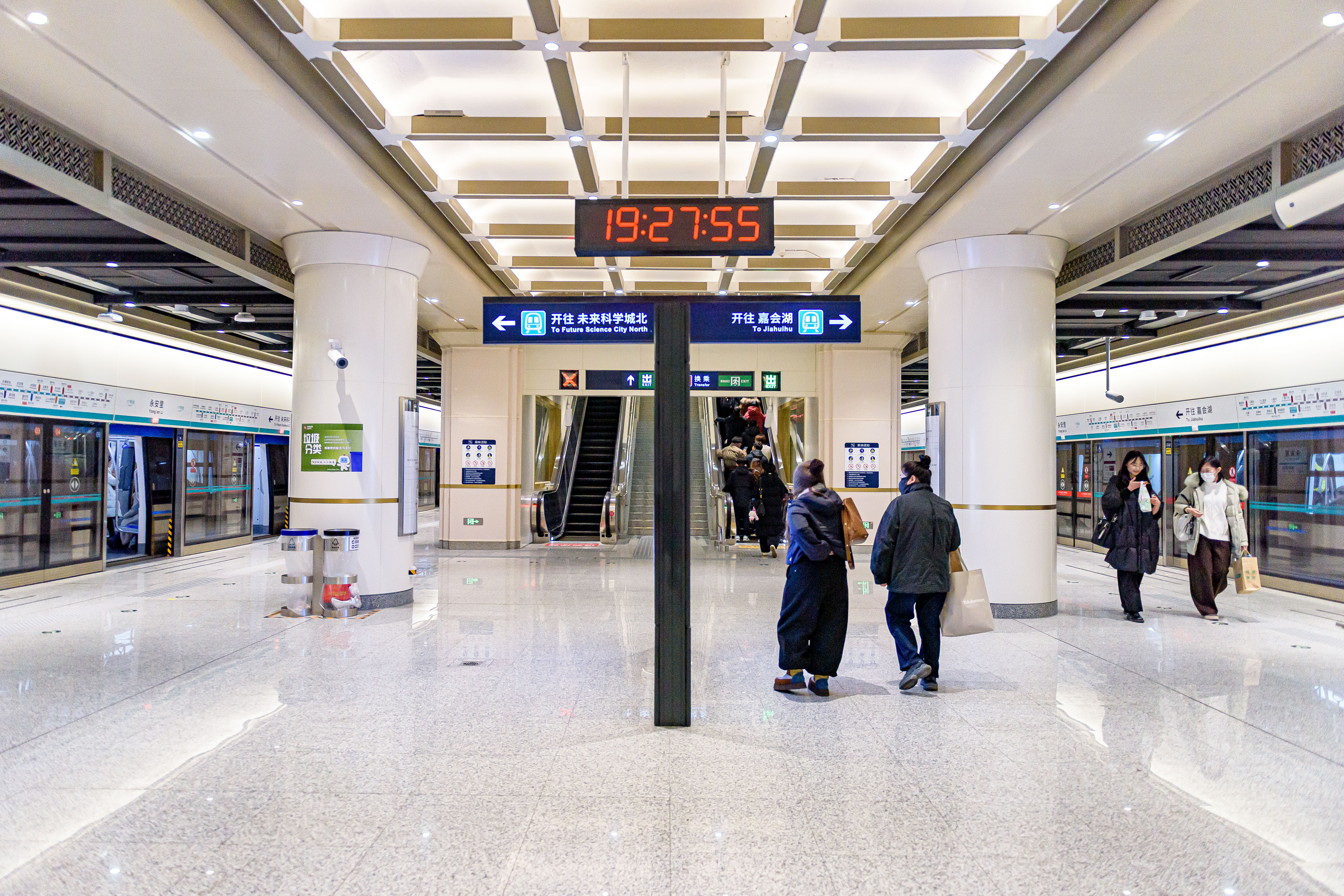
- Line 1 platform Line 17 platform

General information
- Location: Jianguomen Outer Street and Dongdaqiao Road (东大桥路); Jianwai Subdistrict, Chaoyang District, Beijing; China
- Coordinates: 39°54′30″N 116°27′02″E
- Operator: Beijing Mass Transit Railway Operation Corporation Limited (Line 1); Beijing MTR (Line 17)
- Lines: Line 1; Line 17
- Platforms: 4 (2 island platforms)
- Tracks: 4

Construction
- Structure type: Underground
- Accessible: Yes

Other information
- Station code: 121

History
- Opened: Line 1: September 28, 1999; 27 years ago; Line 17: December 27, 2025; 9 months ago

Services
Preceding station	Beijing Subway	Following station
Jianguomen towards Pingguoyuan	Line 1	Guomao towards Universal Resort
Dongdaqiao towards Weilaikexuechengbei (Future Science City North)	Line 17	Panjiayuanxi towards Jiahuihu
Future services
Dongdaqiao towards Weilaikexuechengbei (Future Science City North)	Line 17	Guangqumen Wai towards Jiahuihu
Location
- Location within Beijing

Yong'an Li station (Chinese: 永安里站; pinyin: Yǒng'ān Lǐ zhàn) is an interchange station between Line 1 and Line 17 of the Beijing Subway. The Line 1 station opened on September 28, 1999, and the Line 17 station opened on December 27, 2025. Automatic platform gates were installed on the Line 1 platforms on July 18, 2016, making it the first station on Line 1 to install platform gates.

== Station layout ==
The station has underground island platforms for both Line 1 and Line 17.

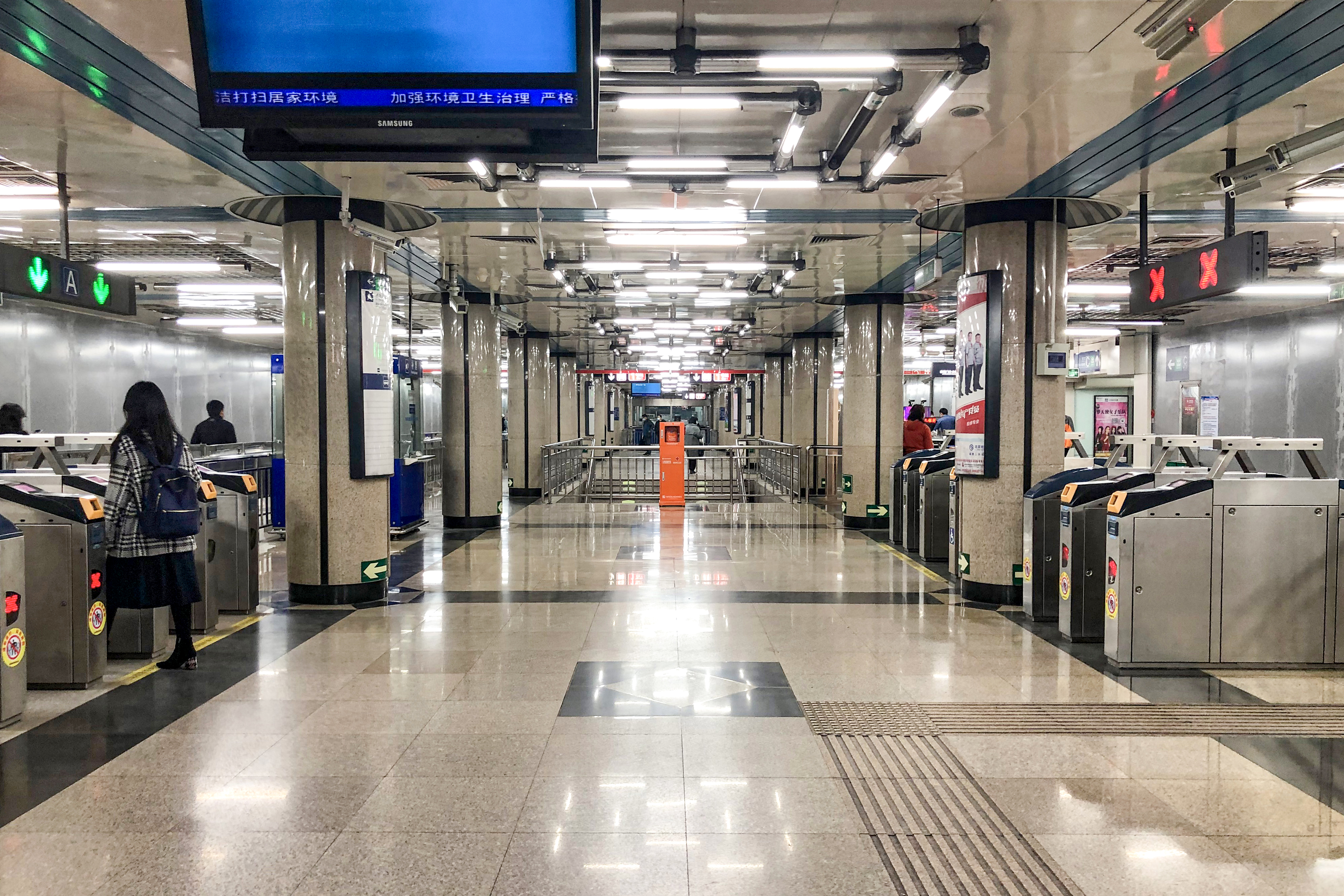
Concourse in November 2020

=== Entrances/exits ===
There are 7 exits, lettered A, B, C, E, F and G. Exit C is accessible via a stairlift and Exits E and F are accessible via elevators. There is also an unlettered exit that leads to The Exchange Twin Towers. (Chinese: 汇京双子座大厦)

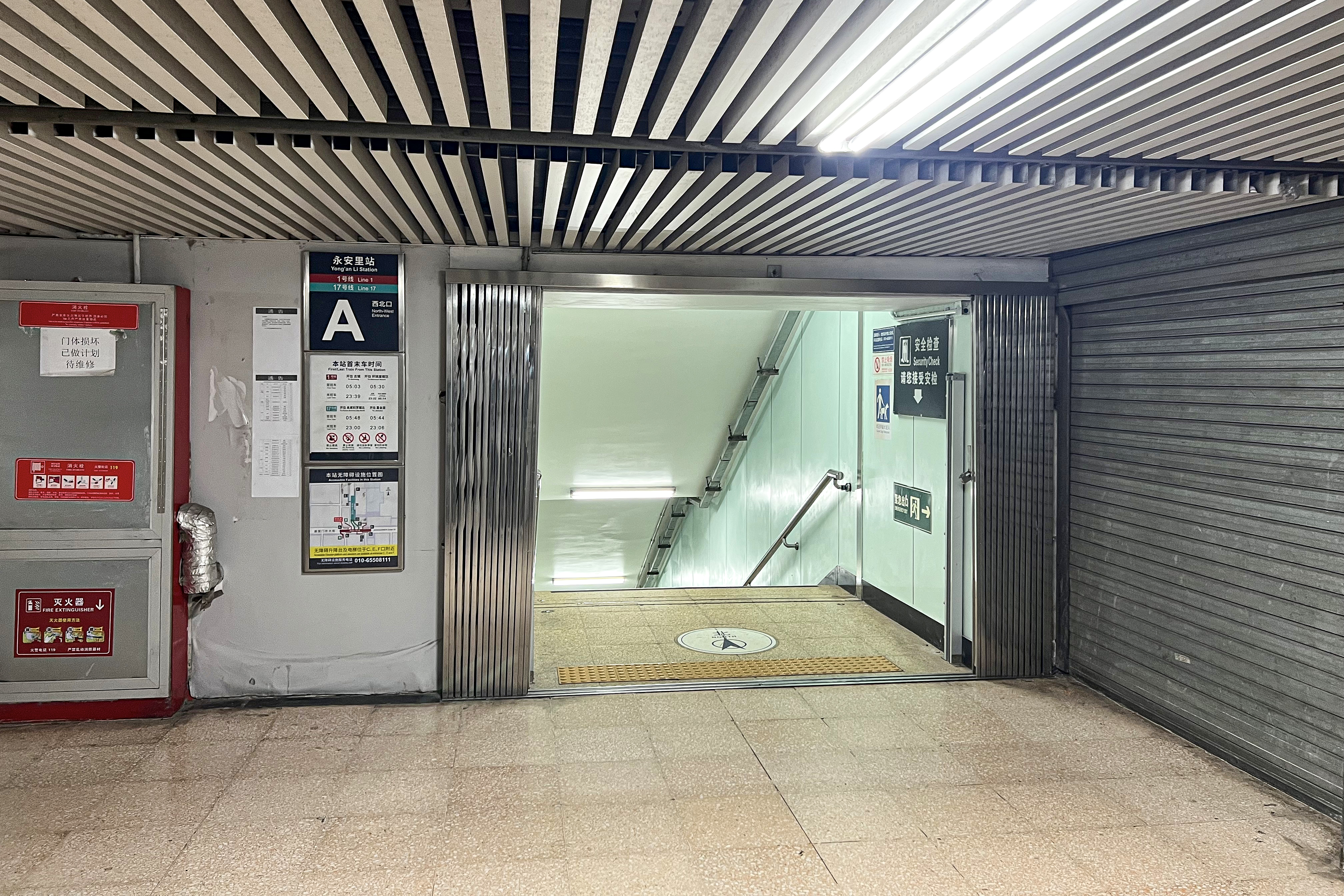
Exit A

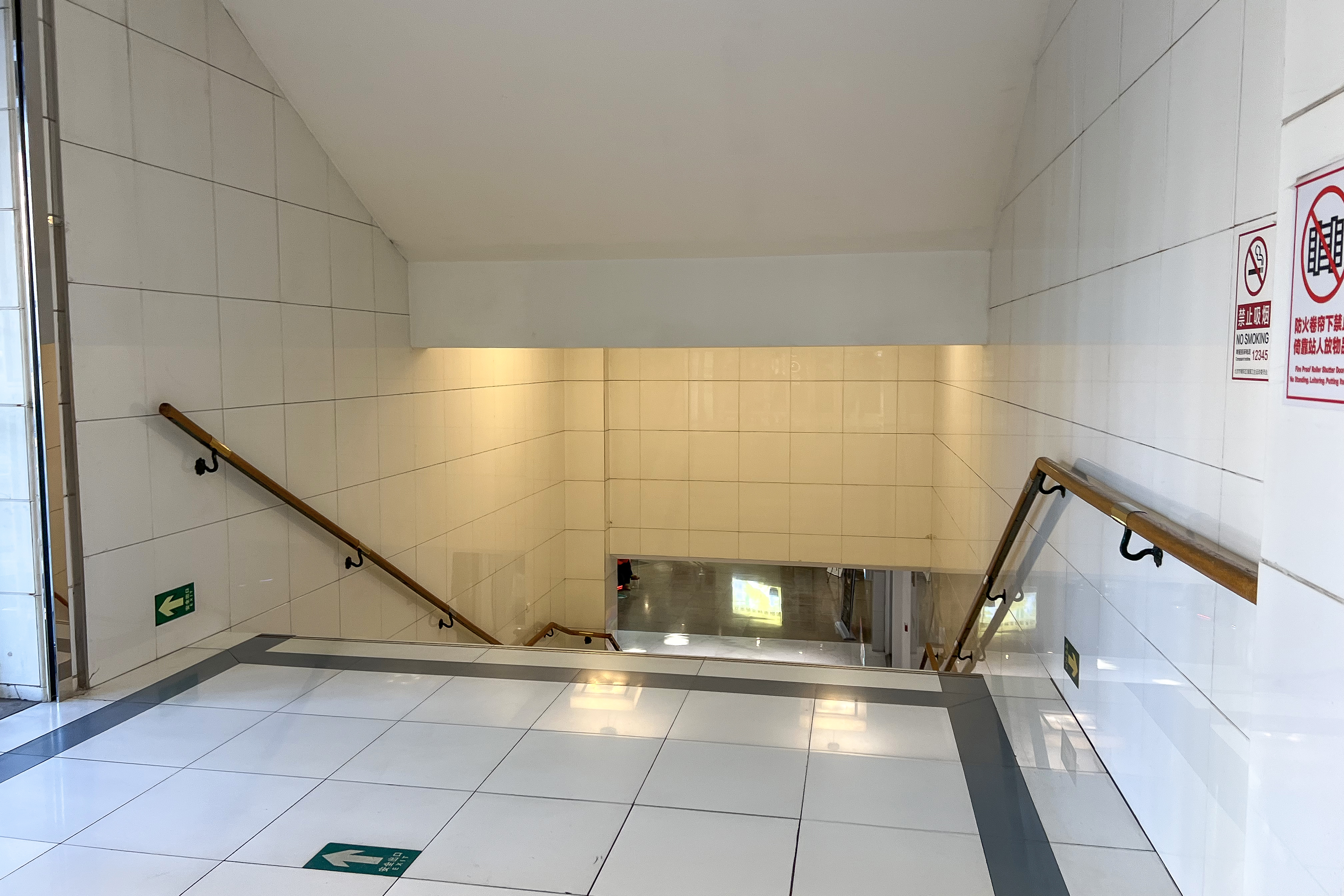
Exit A (Silk Street)

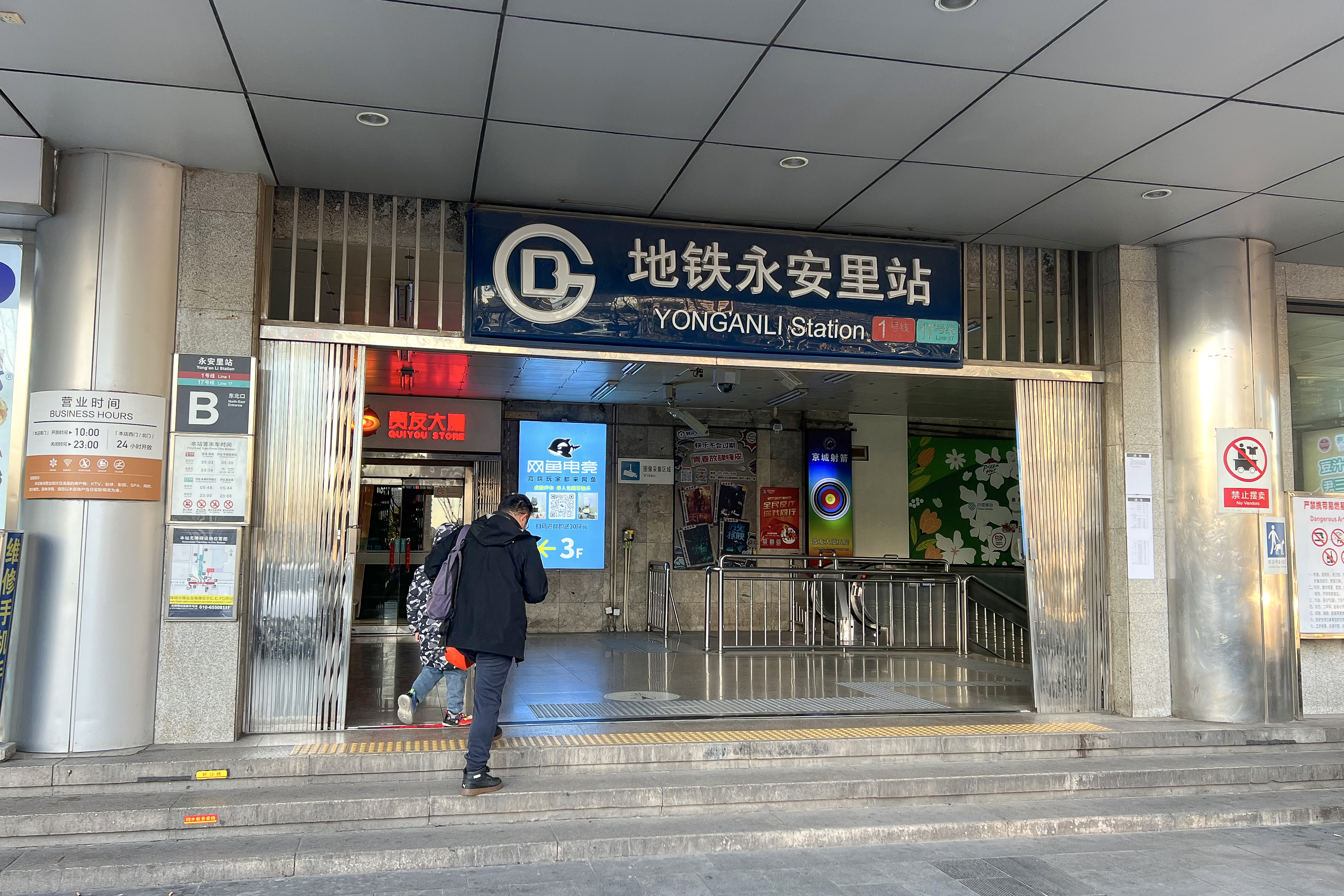
Exit B

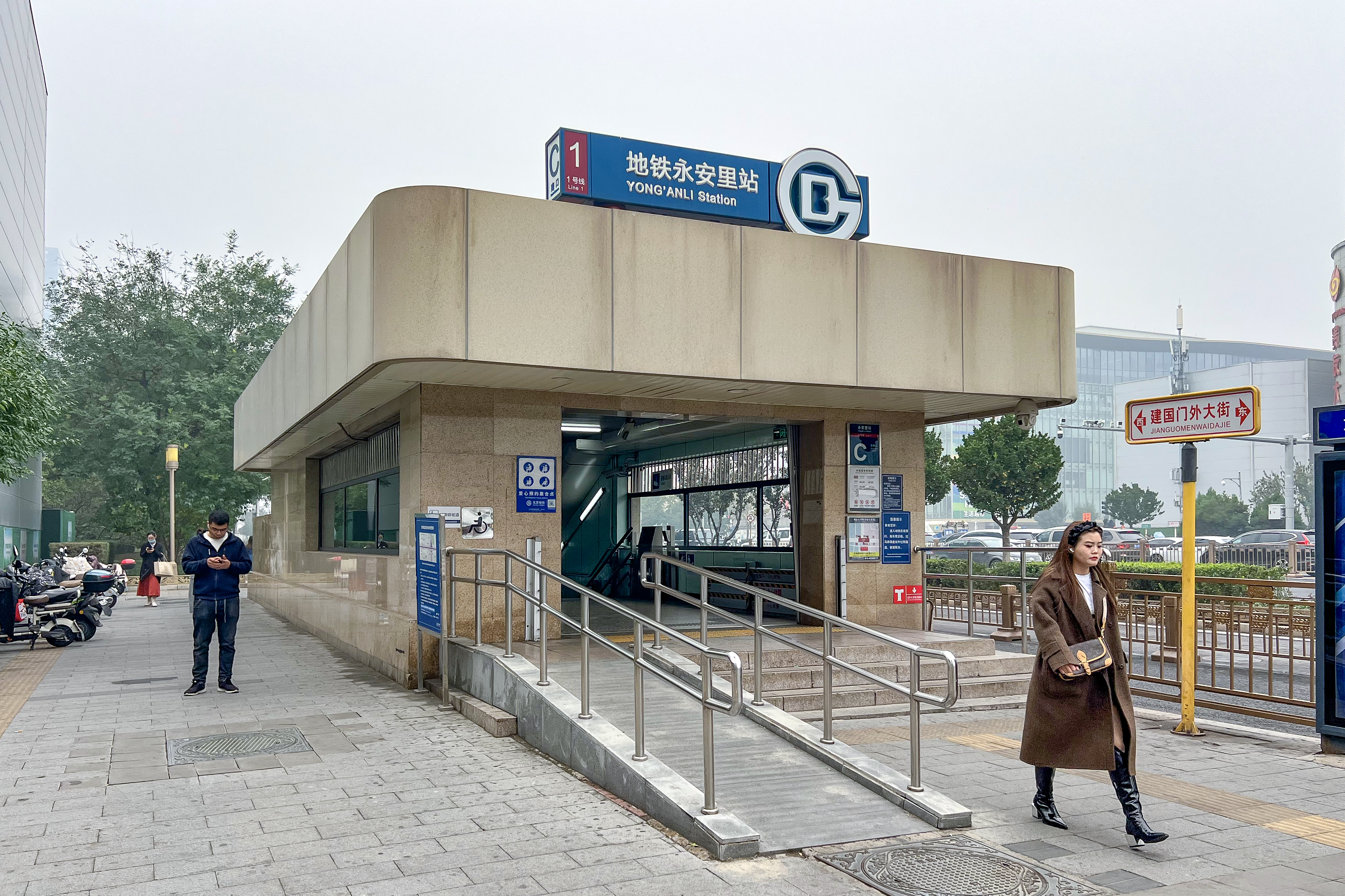
Exit C

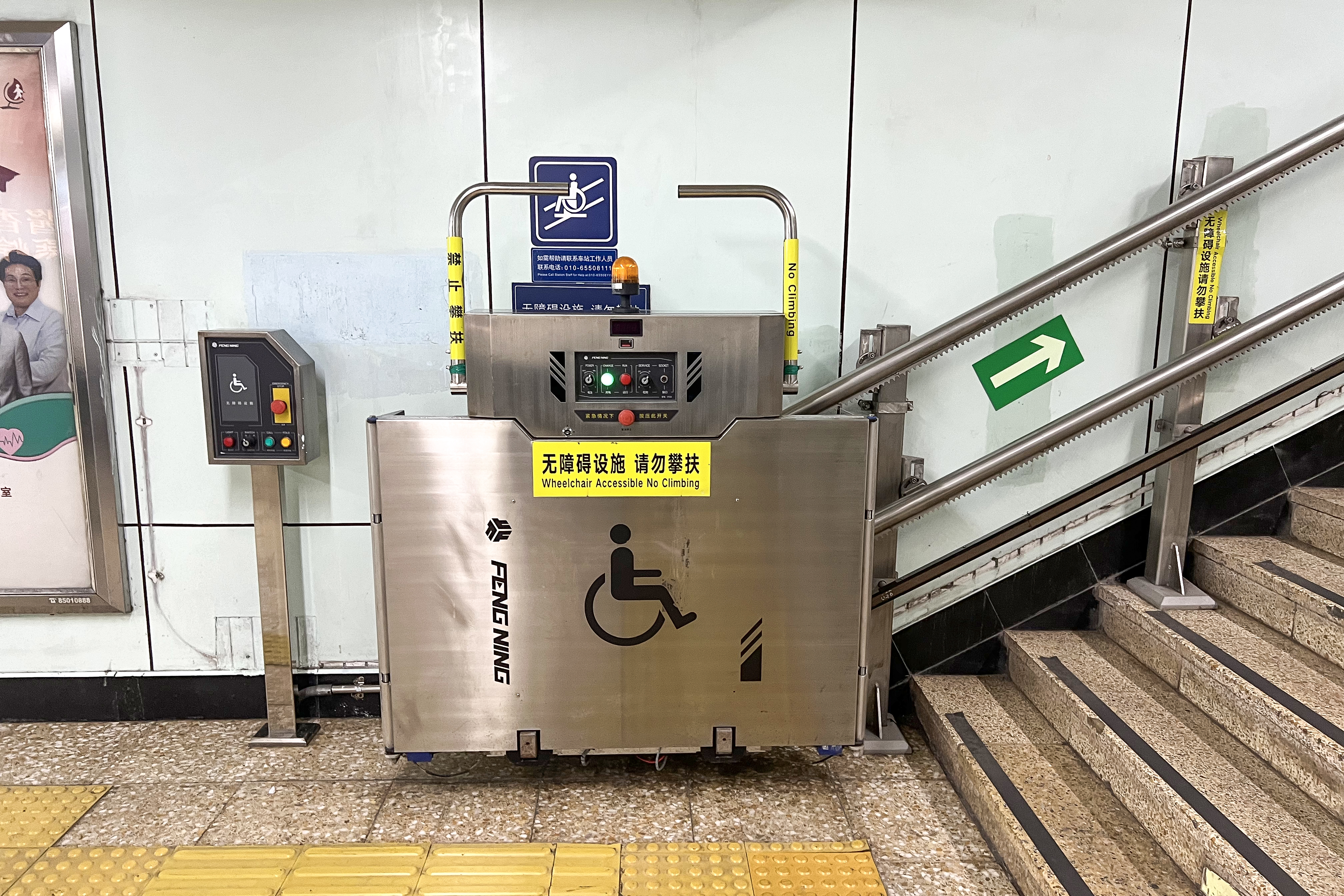
Stairlift of Exit C

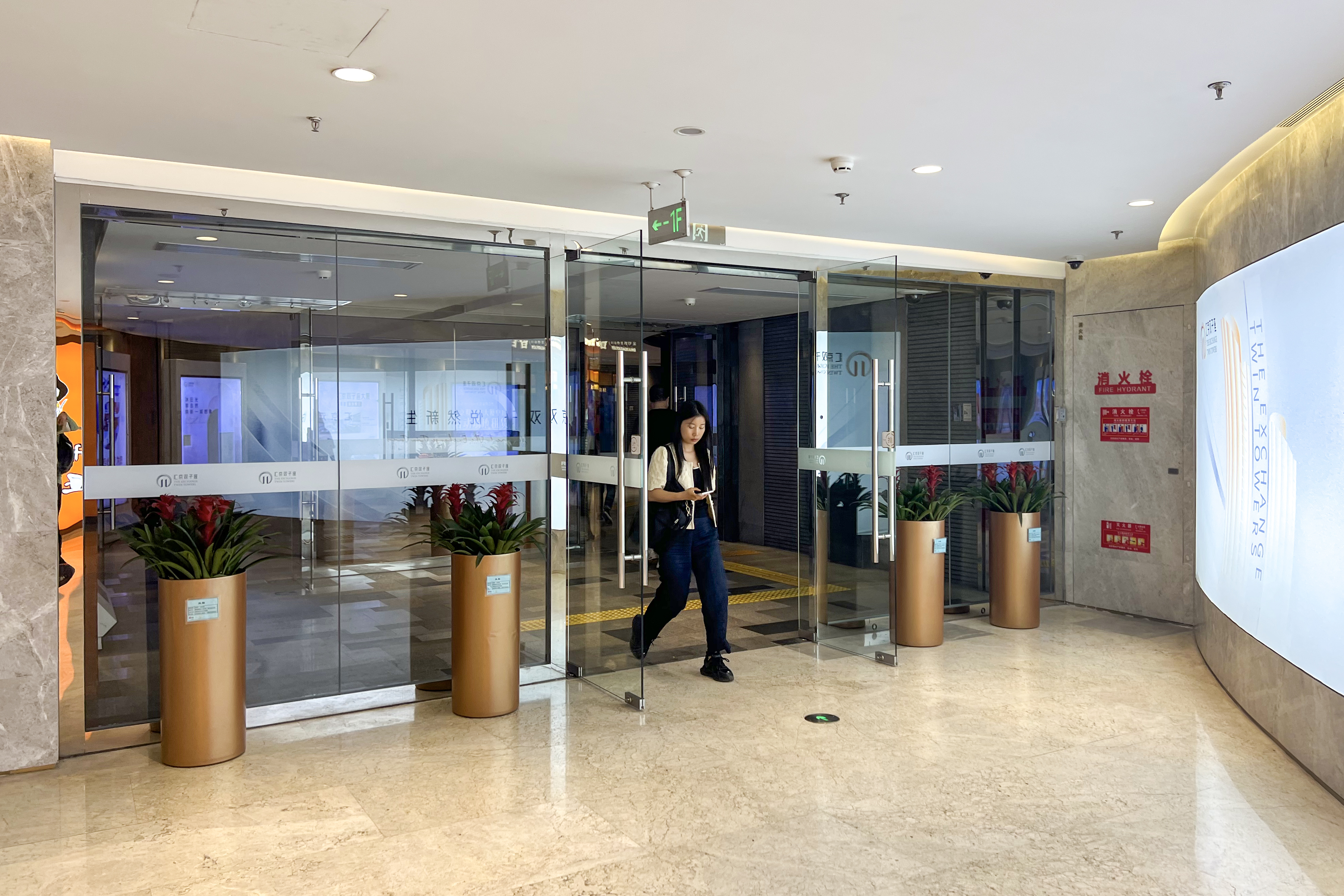
The Exchange Twin Towers Exit

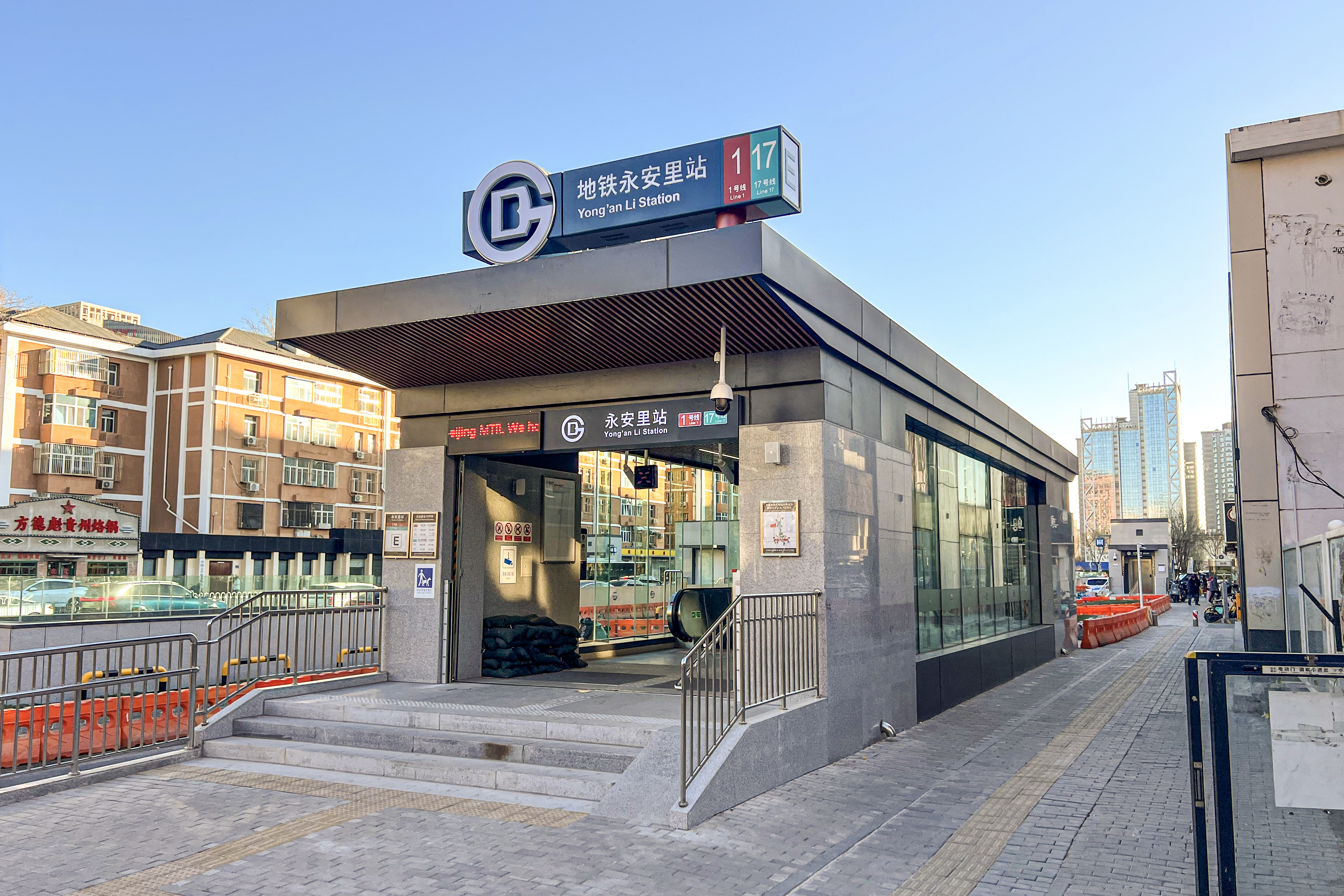
Exit E

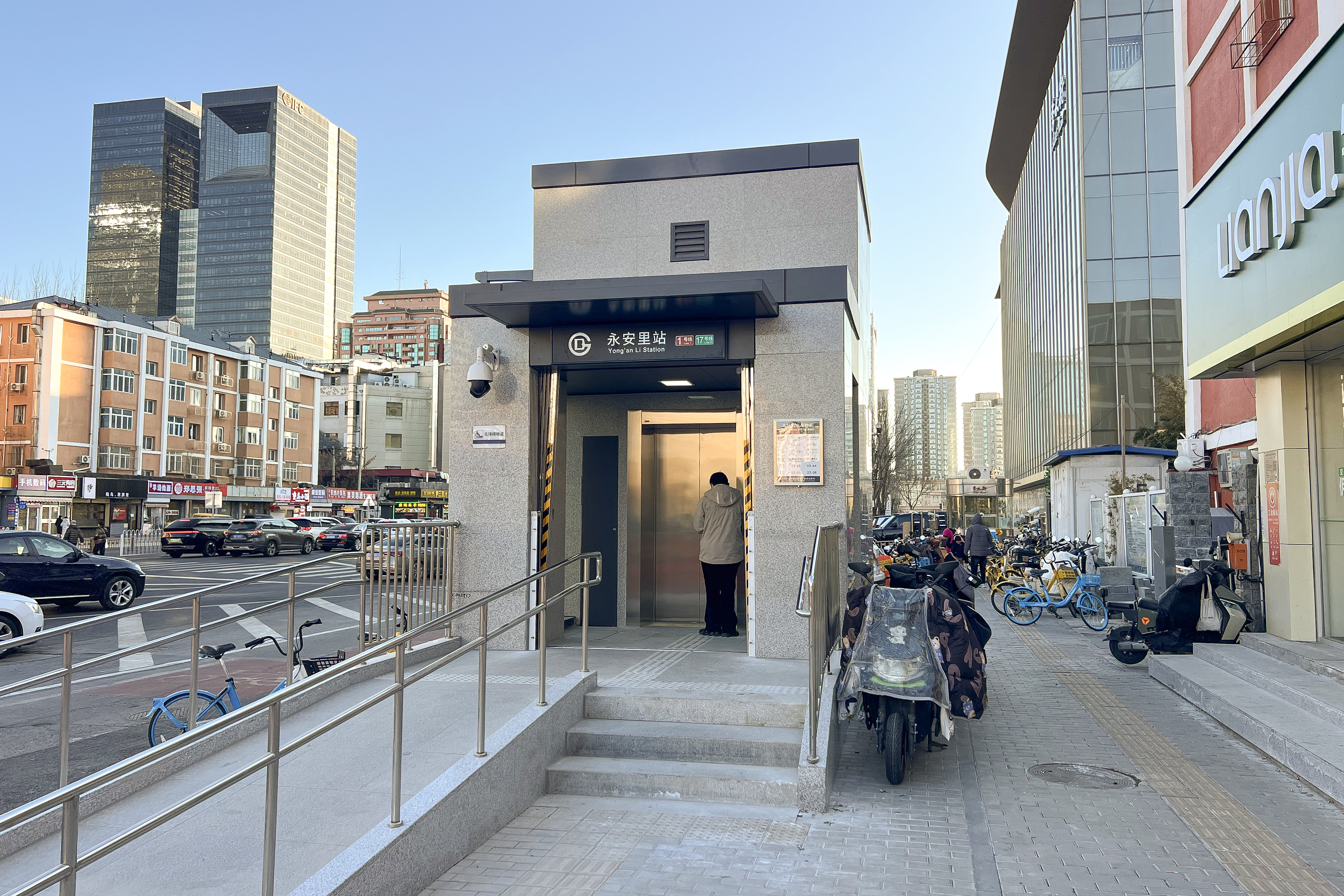
Elevator of Exit E

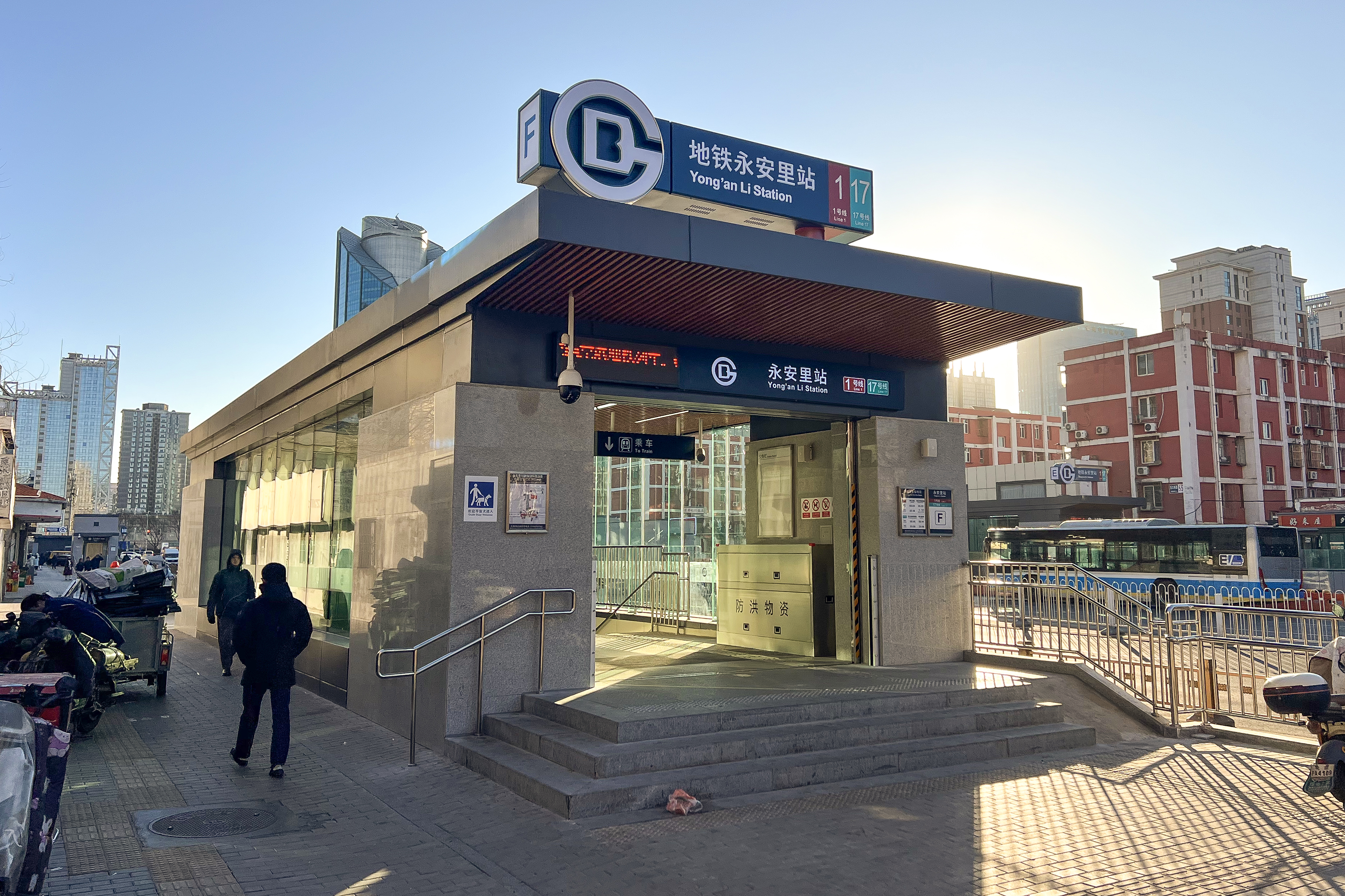
Exit F

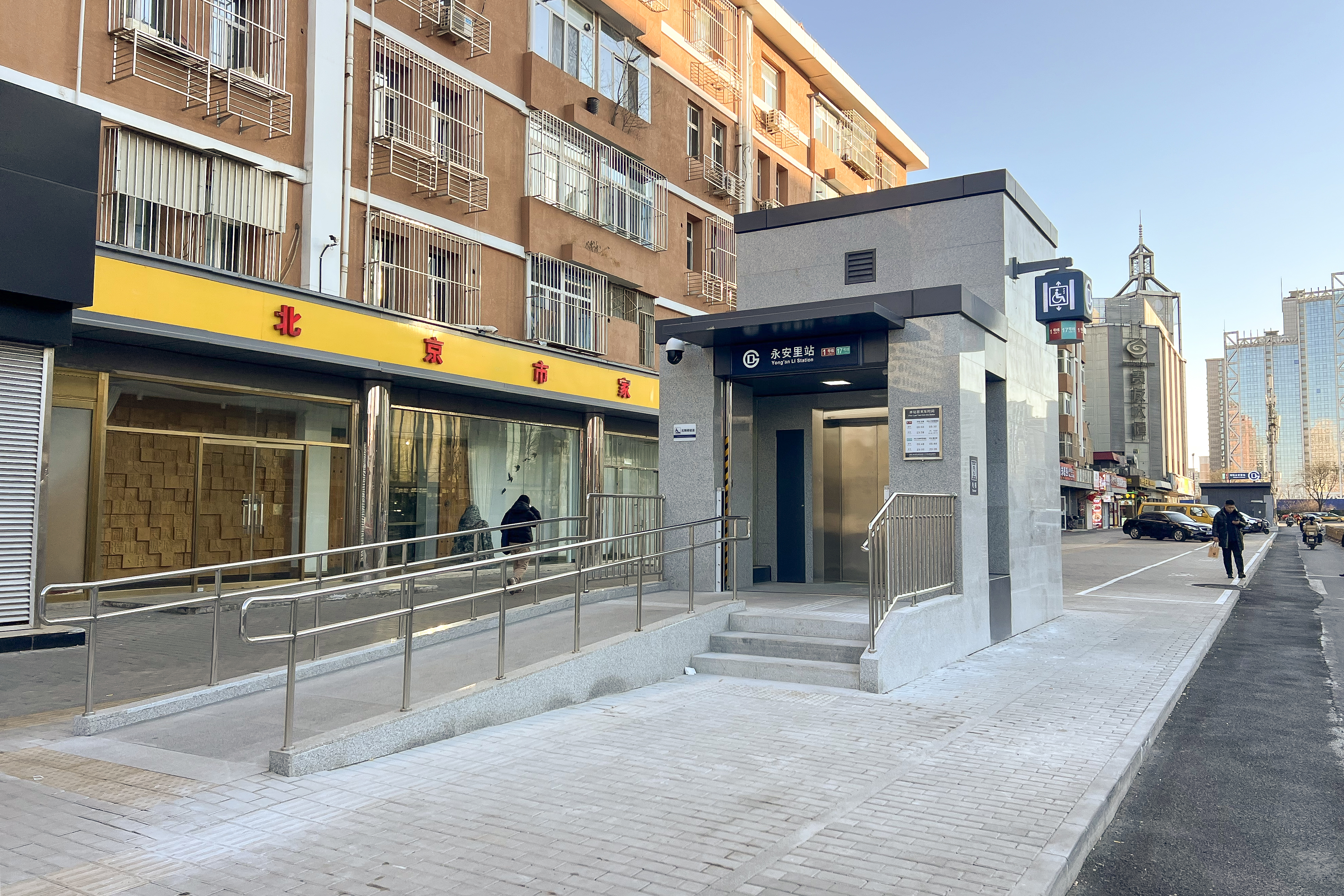
Elevator of Exit F

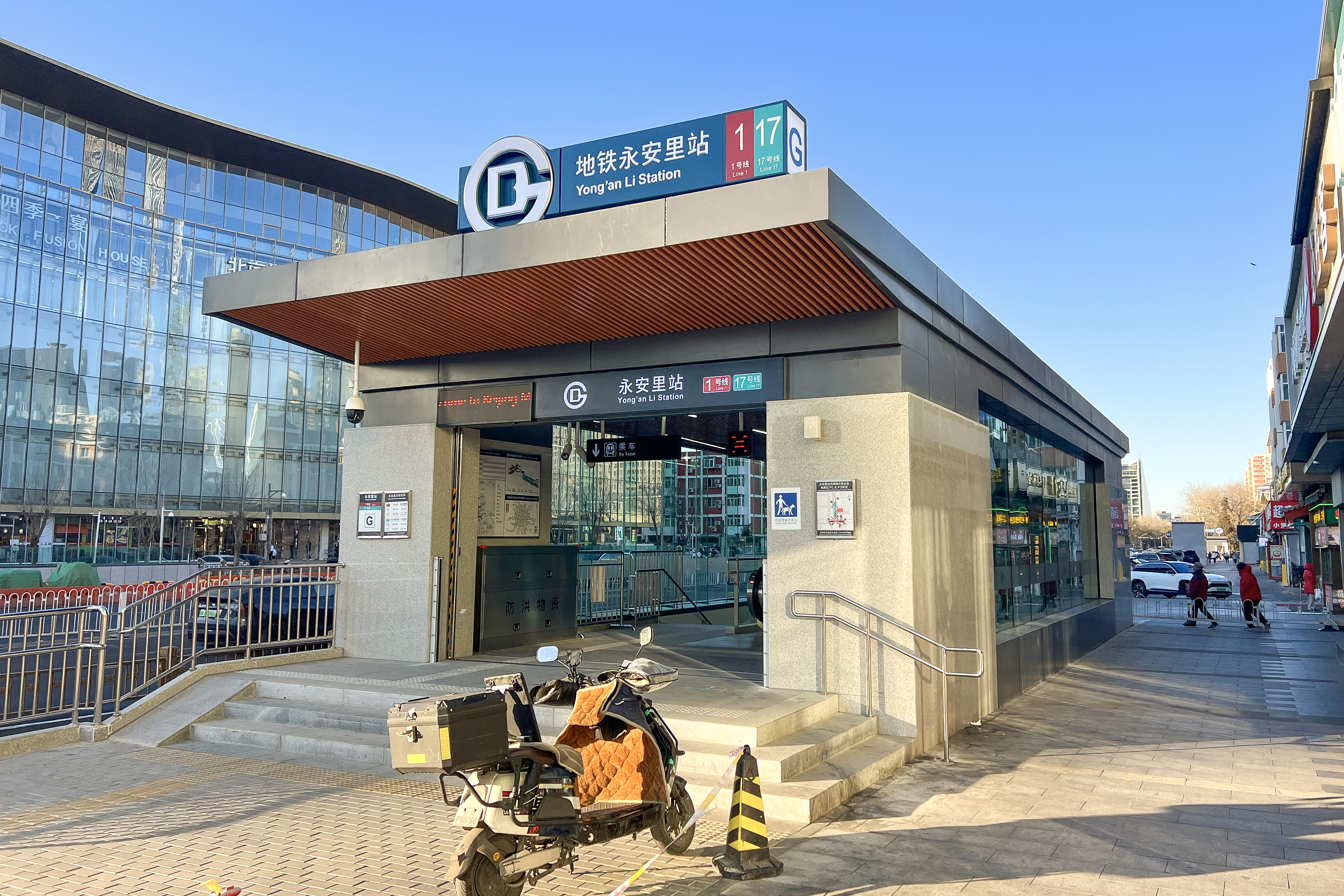
Exit G

== Future plan ==
In long-term planning, Line 20 will stop at this station.

== Nearby attractions ==
- Silk Street
- Taiwan Strait Tourism Association Beijing Office
