= Panjiayuan antique market =

Antiques market in Beijing, China

Coordinates: 39.874°N 116.452°E

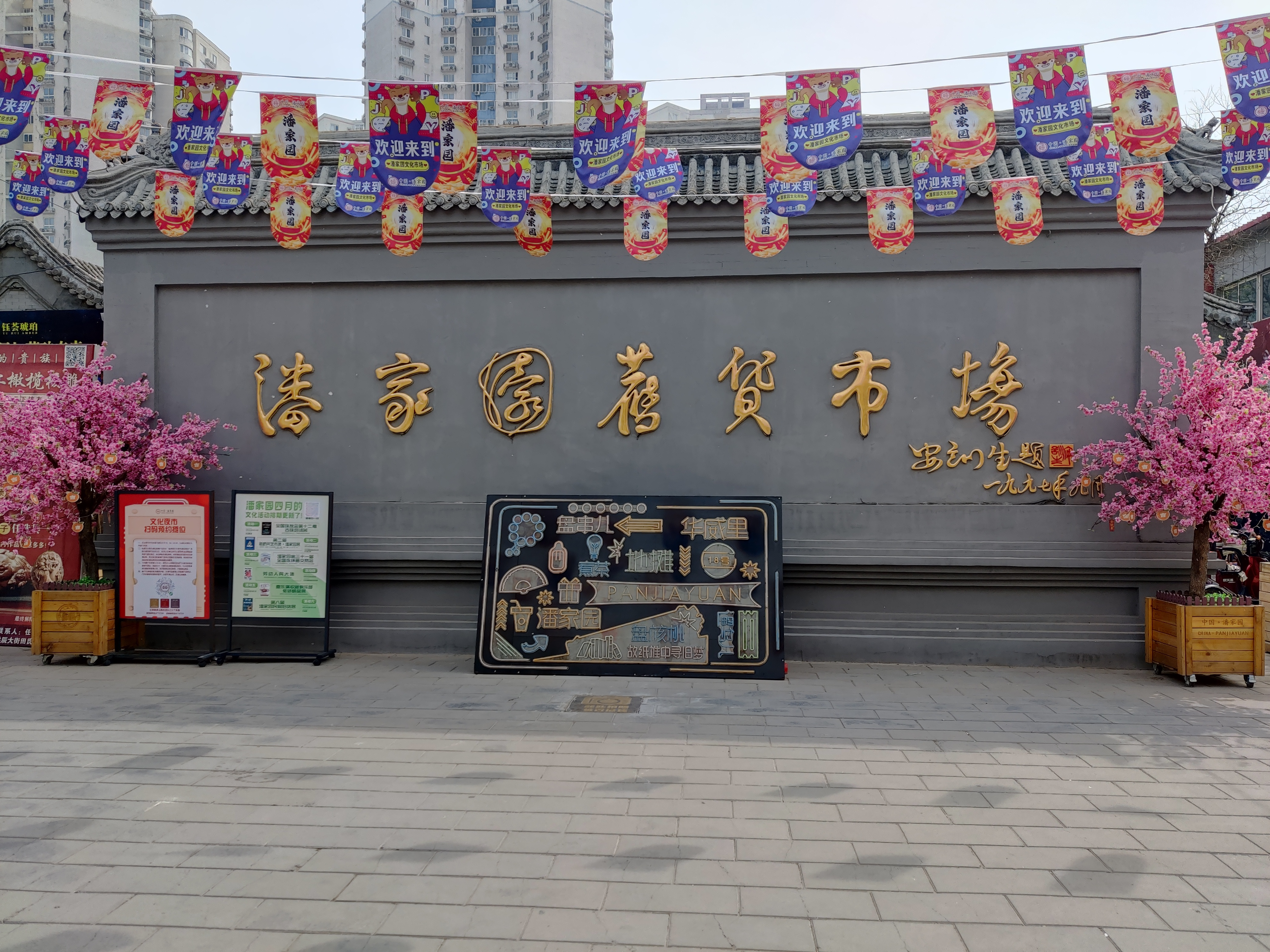
Panjiayuan market

The Panjiayuan antique market (Chinese: 潘家园旧货市场), sometimes known as the dirt market, is an open-air market in Panjiayuan Subdistrict, Beijing. It is the largest flea market in Beijing, and one of the largest in China. Vendors sell objects such as books, paintings, and handicrafts, many of which are antiques.

== Location ==
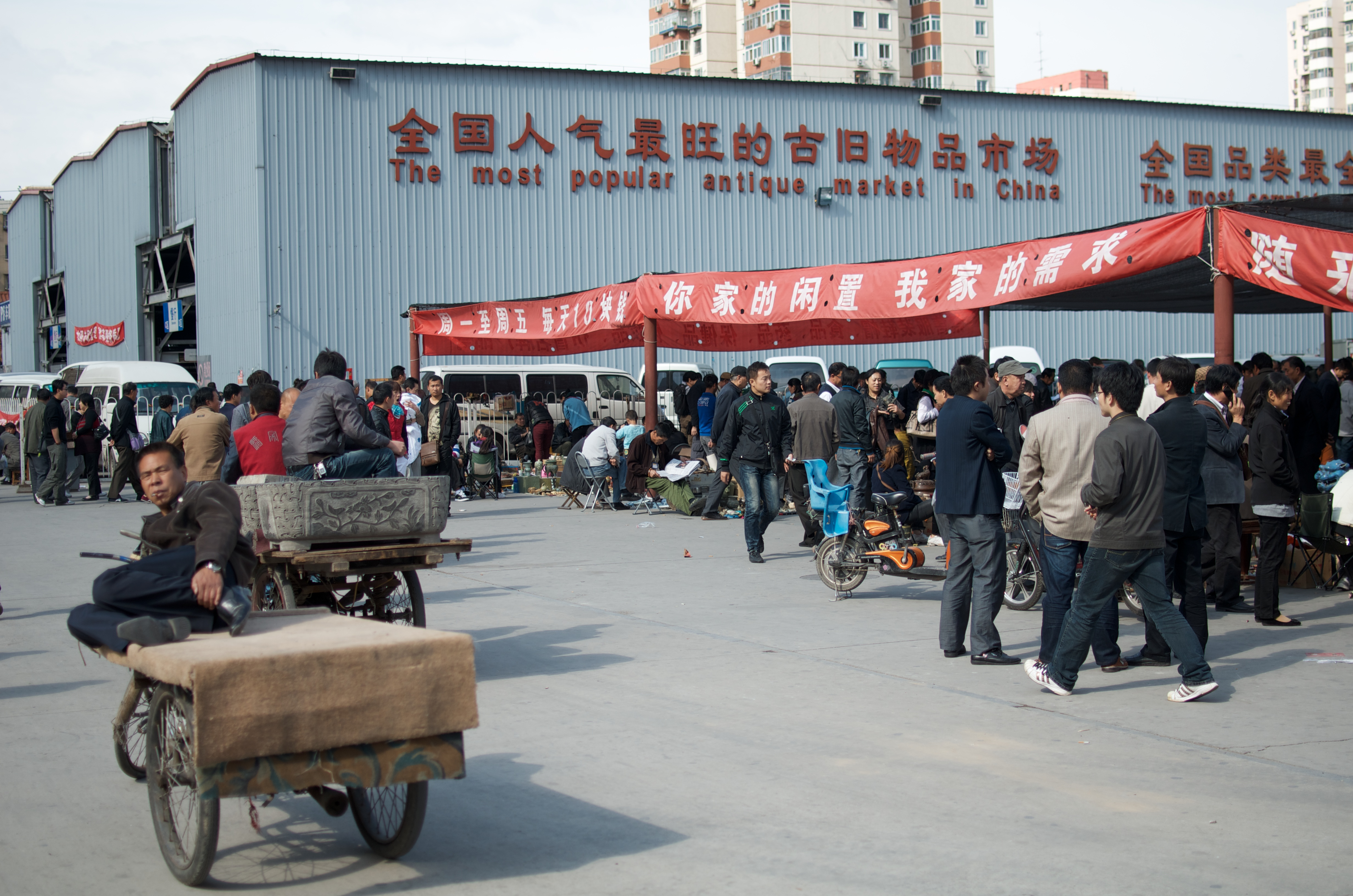
Panjiayuan market, 2011

It is located in southeast Beijing, near the Panjiayuan Bridge, East 3rd Ring Road South, Chaoyang District. It covers an area of 48,500 square metres (522,000 sq ft), of which 26,000 square metres (280,000 sq ft) are for business. There are about 4,000 stalls in the market.

== Layout ==
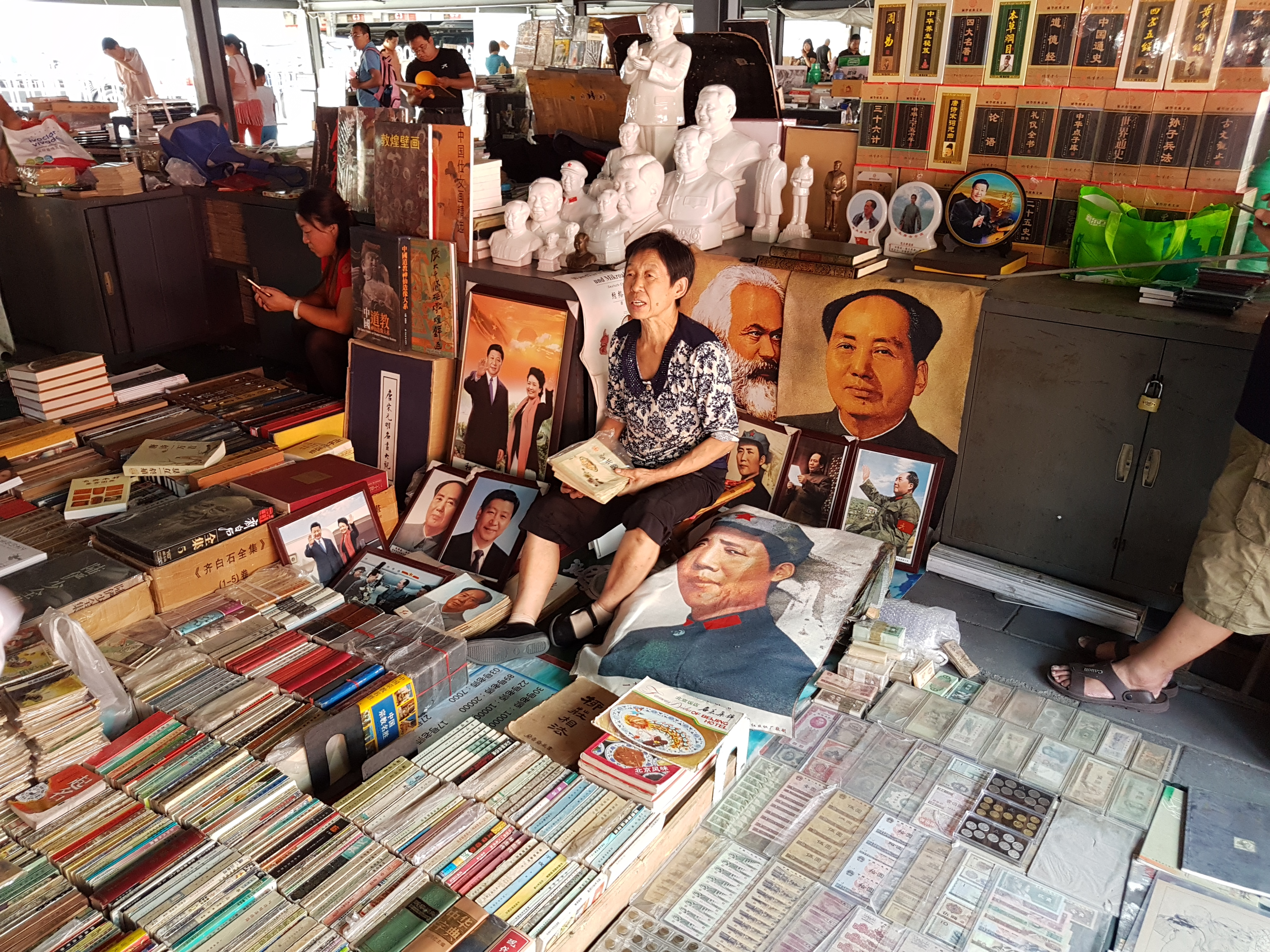
Artwork depicting Mao Zedong is sold at the market, 2016

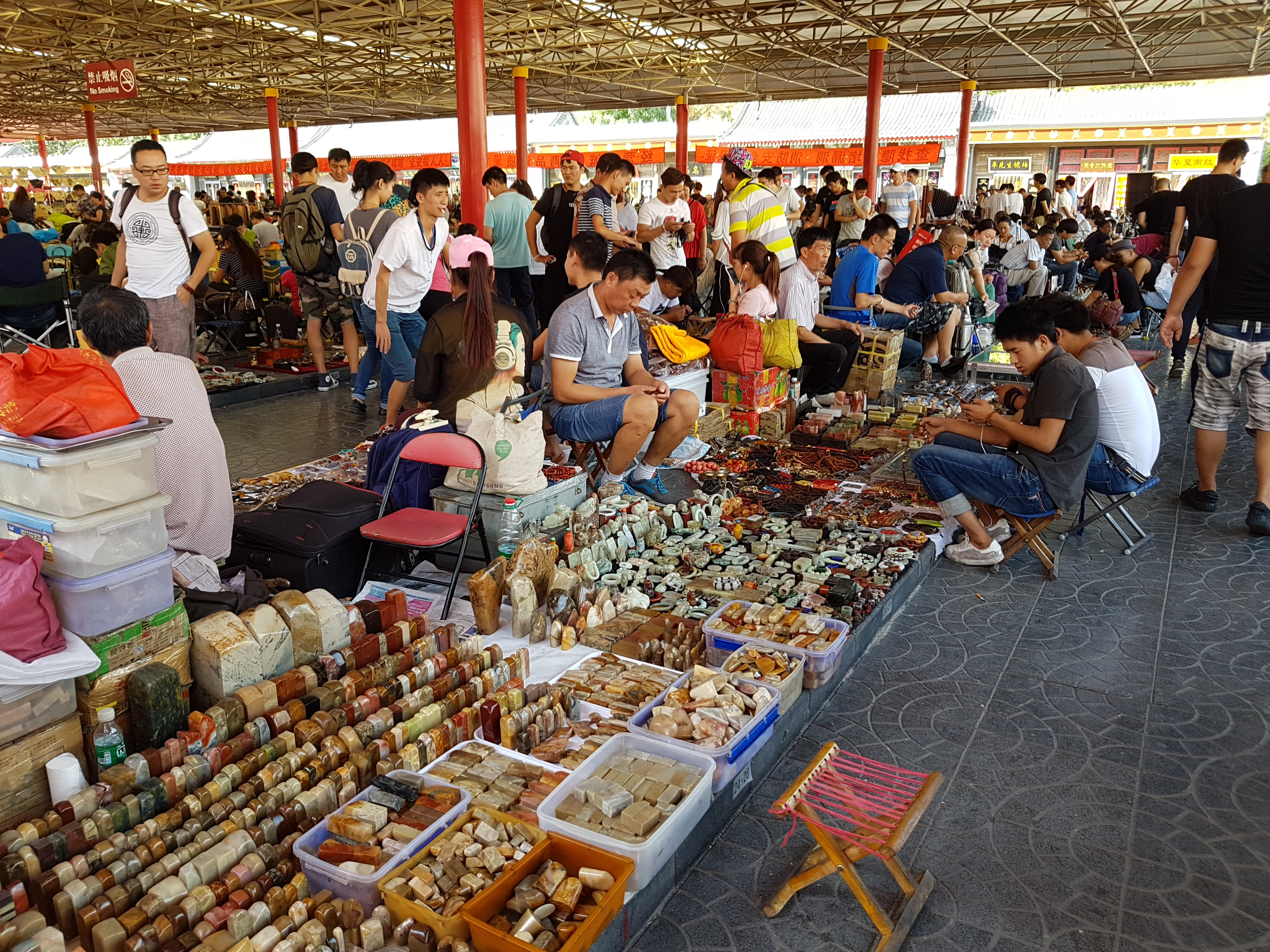
Vendors sell stones and beads, 2016

The market is large and open-air. Markets like the Panjiayuan market are often visited by historians and collectors seeking Mao–era art and literature. Many objects at the market are counterfeits or replicas, though older documents are often authentic.

The market is divided into five parts:

- Buddhism Statues Area. in the western part of the market, it is an open-air area where large stone sculptures are sold out of trucks.
- Antique Furniture Area. Next to the Buddhism Statues Area, two-storied building that houses traditional furniture and Cultural Revolution articles.
- "High-rank" Antique Store Area.
- Books and Scrolls Area. a narrow lane in the south where secondhand books and ancient scrolls are sold.
- Middle Area. a semi-covered area that forms the main part of the market. This is open only at the weekends.

Middle Area has four zones:

- Zone One. Chinese paintings, calligraphic works as well as beads and jade.
- Zone Two. beads, bronze vessels, ceramic vases and small wooden furniture.
- Zone Three. Chinese ethnic minority arts and crafts, trinkets, antiques and apparel. Many of these traders are from Tibet.
- Zone Four. Chinese ceramics

Products sold at the market include: snuff bottles made in Hengshui, Yangliuqing New Year paintings, embroidery made in Jiangsu, wood carvings from Dongyang, stone carvings from Quyang, shadow play paraphernalia from Shandong, porcelain and crystal ornaments from Jiangxi, boccaro wares from Yixing, bronze wares from Shaanxi, costumes from Yunnan, Tibetan Buddhist articles, white jade from Xinjiang, and Jiaozhi pottery from Taiwan. These folk handicrafts are gathered in the market before being distributed all over the world.

== History ==
The market was officially established in 1992, having begun informally as an early-morning "ghost market" in the early 1980s. Over time, it became more popular than Liulichang shops.

In preparation for the 2008 Summer Olympics, the market was redeveloped in the mid-2000s.

As trade in folk antiques and handiwork grew, it had become a large antique and handiwork market spreading folk culture in 2002. Many Chinese antique collectors believe that they started their career in Panjiayuan.

The market is often visited by international tourists, and has been visited by foreign leaders such as Hillary Clinton, Chandrika Kumaratunga, and Costas Simitis.

== See also ==
- Chinese art
- Silk Street

== Sources ==
- Liu, Dan (2006). Beijing's Panjiayuan Market--an Oriental Goldmine. Beijing: Foreign Language Press. ISBN 978-7-119-04126-1.
- Wang, Jinchang (2008). History Picking up from Panjiayuan Market. Beijing: China Social Science Press. ISBN 978-7-5004-6701-4.
- Yang, Qun; Mo, Geng (2006). Investigation on Miao ethnic group in Panjiayuan Market. Beijing: China Writer Press. ISBN 7-5063-3516-6.
