= Panjiayuan Subdistrict =

Panjiayuan Subdistrict 潘家园街道
- Subdistrict
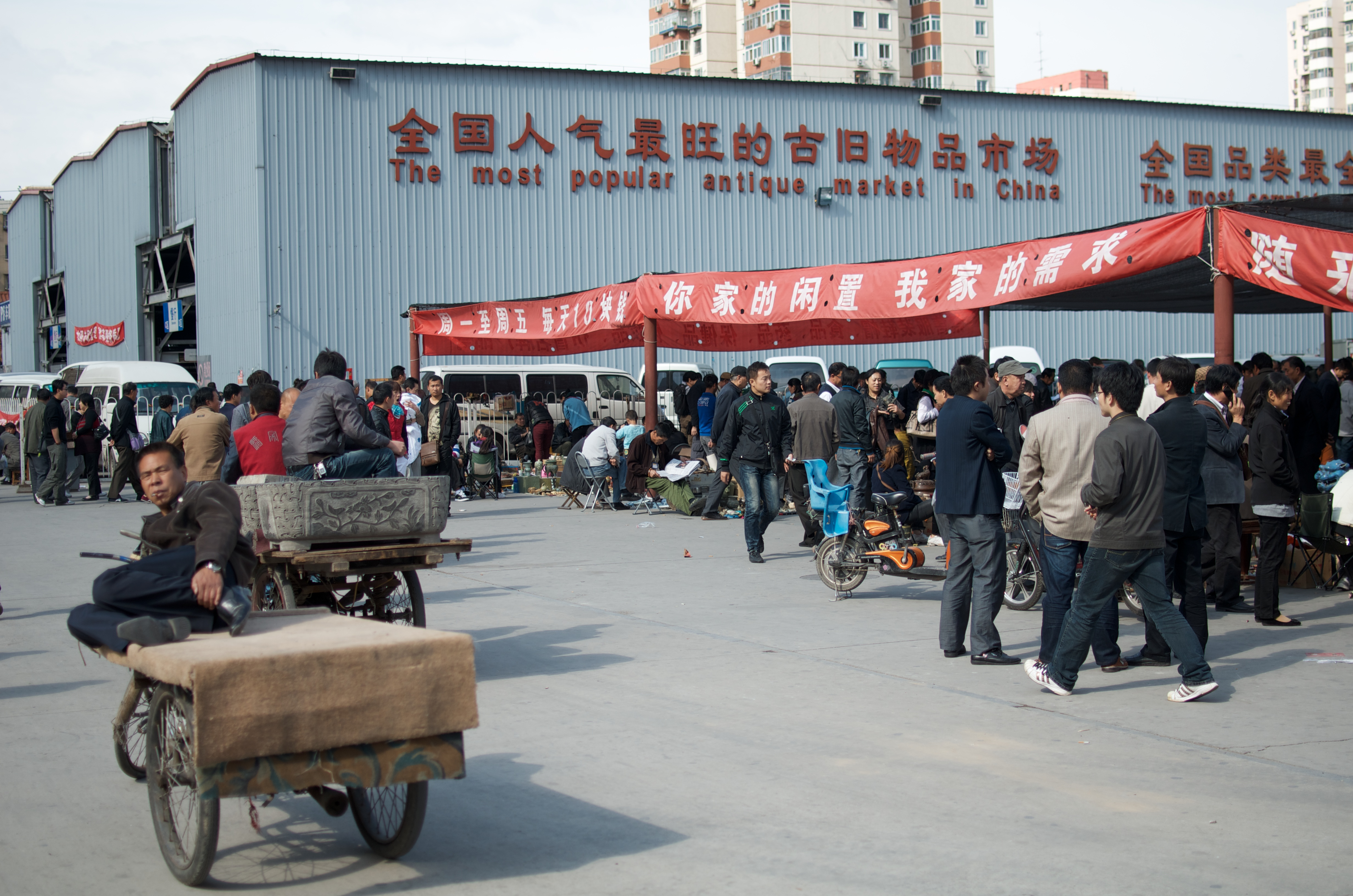
- Panjiayuan Market within the subdistrict, 2011

- Location within Beijing Location within China
- Coordinates: 39°52′24″N 116°26′51″E
- Country: China
- Municipality: Beijing
- District: Chaoyang
- Village-level Divisions: 14 communities

Area
  - Total: 4.3 km^{2} (1.7 sq mi)

Population (2020)
  - Total: 100,272
  - Density: 23,000/km^{2} (60,000/sq mi)
- Time zone: UTC+8 (China Standard)
- Postal code: 100021
- Area code: 010

Panjiayuan Subdistrict (Chinese: 潘家园街道; pinyin: Pānjiāyuán Jiēdào) is a subdistrict of Chaoyang District, Beijing, China. The Panjiayuan area is located towards the South end of the East 3rd Ring road. It borders Jinsong Subdistrict to the north, Nanmofang Township to the east, Nanmofang and Shibalidian Townships to the south, and Longtan Lake Park of Dongcheng District to the east. Panjiayuan is famous for its flea markets, and as of 2020, it has a population of 100,272.

The subdistrict got its name from Panjiayao (Chinese: 潘家窑; lit. 'Pan Family Ware') Village within the area, which later changed its name to Panjiayuan.

== History ==
Panjiayuan Subdistrict was established in 1984, with 45 residents' committees under its control. In 2000, it was reduced to 12 residents's committees.

== Administrative Divisions ==
As of 2021, there are 14 communities within the subdistrict:

Administrative Division Code	Community Name in English	Community Name in Simplified Chinese
110105018065	Mofang Nanli	磨房南里
110105018066	Wusheng Dongli	武圣东里
110105018067	Songyu Dongli	松榆东里
110105018068	Songyuli	松榆里
110105018069	Songyu Xili	松榆西里
110105018070	Wusheng Nongguang	武圣农光
110105018071	Huawei Beili	华威北里
110105018072	Panjiayuan Dongli	潘家园东里
110105018073	Huawei Xili	华威西里
110105018074	Panjiayuan	潘家园
110105018075	Panjiayuan Nanli	潘家园南里
110105018076	Huaweili	华威里
110105018077	Songyu Xilibei	松榆西里北
110105018078	Wusheng Xili	武圣西里

== Markets ==
Panjiayuan Antique Market is located at the southwest of Panjiayuan bridge, South road of East third ring road, Chaoyang District, Beijing. Covering an area of 48,500 m^{2}, it is divided into six sections: Roadside stands, Ancient Architecture, Classical Furniture, Modern collection, Sculpture and Stone Engraving, and the Catering section. Trading mostly in antiques, handicrafts, ornaments, and other collectibles, Panjiayuan has an annual revenue of several hundred million yuan. Having more than four thousand shop owners, this market has nearly ten thousand shop assistants in which sixty percent are from the other twenty-eight provinces and municipalities except Beijing. People here come from a variety of backgrounds, there are more than ten minorities of Hui, Man, Miao, Dong, Uighur, Mongolian, Korean, and other ethnic groups of China. Founded in 1992, this market has developed along with the success in business in folk antiques and handicrafts. Diffusing Chinese culture, it has become a large, quaintly classical market of antiques and handicrafts.

Dayanglu Market is one of the largest food markets of Beijing.

== See also ==
- Chaoyang District
- Beijing
