= National Natural History Museum of China =

Municipal public natural history museum in Beijing, China

- 国家自然博物馆
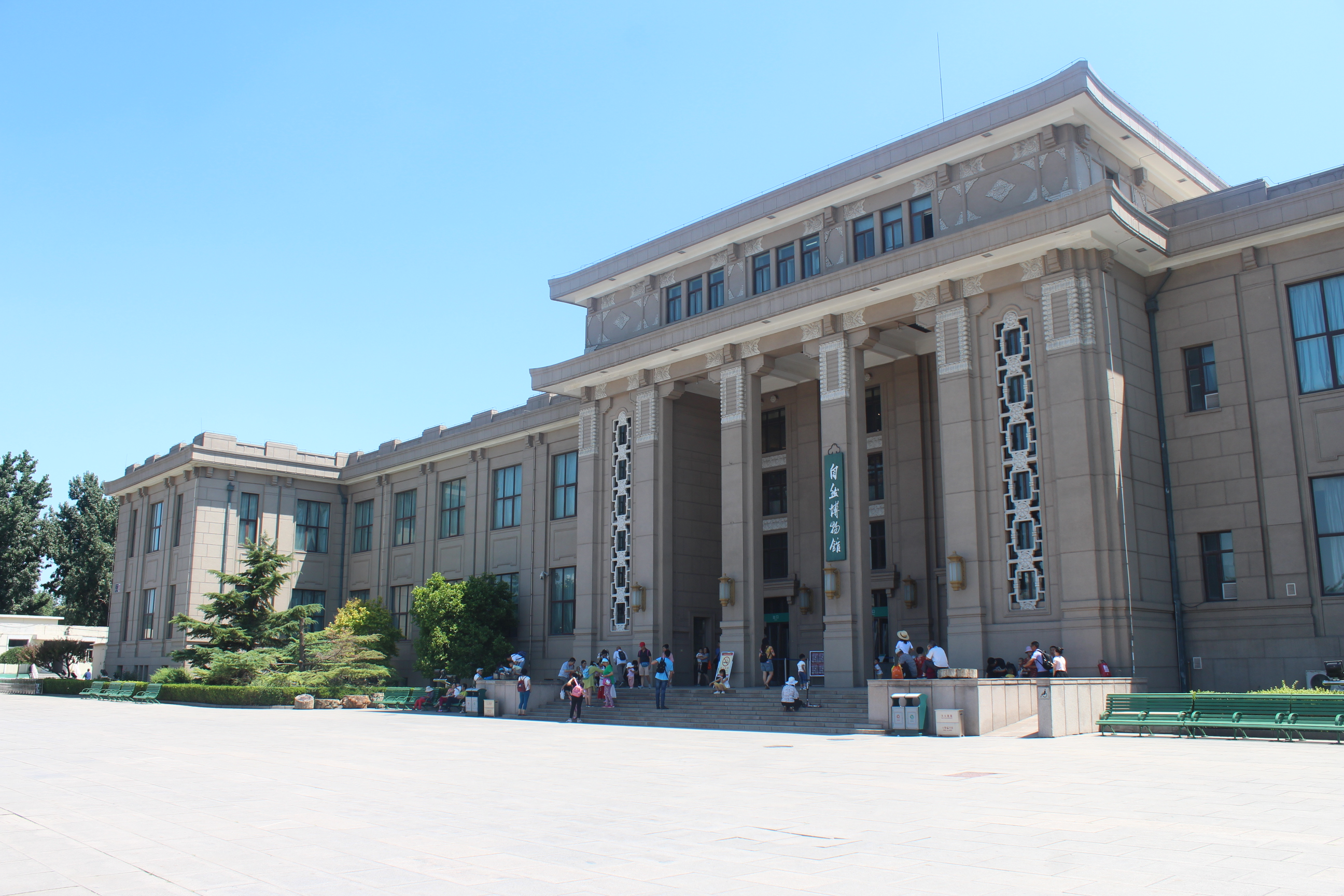
- Former name: Beijing Museum of Natural History (1962–2023)
- Established: 1951
- Location: Dongcheng, Beijing, China
- Coordinates: 39°52′54″N 116°23′38″E
- Type: Public, municipal museum Natural history museum
- Public transit access: Tianqiao station 8
- Website: nnhm.org.cn

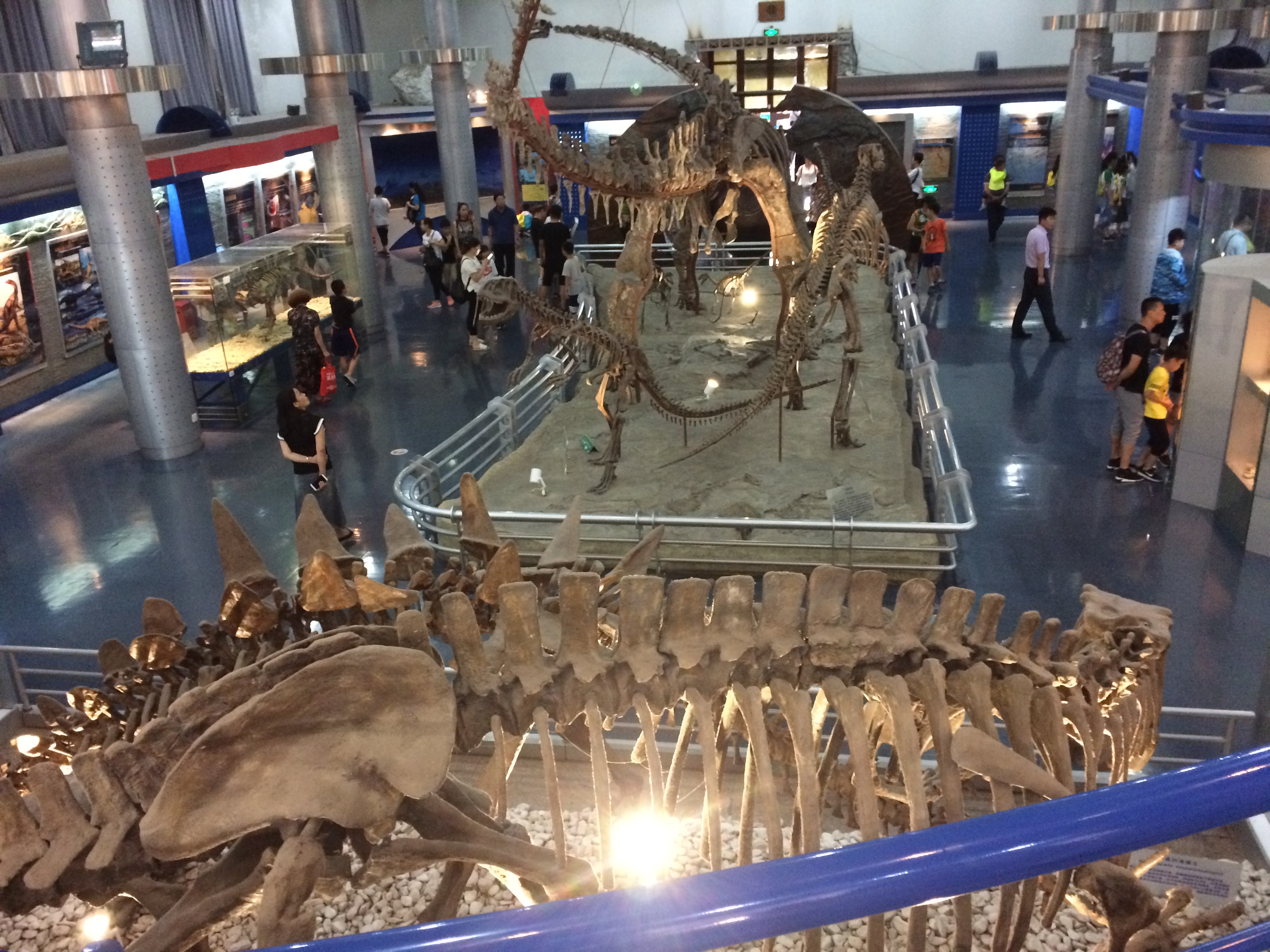
The Mesozoic hall at the Beijing Museum of Natural History.

The National Natural History Museum of China (NNHM; 国家自然博物馆), previously the Beijing Museum of Natural History, is a municipal public natural history museum in Dongcheng, Beijing, China. It is affiliated with the Beijing Academy of Science and Technology under the Beijing Municipal People's Government.

The museum was established as the national Central Museum of Natural History by the Central Ministry of Culture and the Chinese Academy of Sciences in 1951. In 1962, during the Great Leap Forward period, the museum was transferred to the city government of Beijing and was renamed the Beijing Museum of Natural History. Initially affiliated with the Beijing Municipal Culture Bureau, the museum then came under the purview of the Beijing Municipal Science and Technology Bureau in 1975, and later, the Beijing Academy of Science and Technology in 1985. In January 2023, after receiving an approval reply from the Central Institutional Organization Commission, the Beijing city government ratified the museum's application for a name change. Consequently, in June 2023, it was officially renamed the National Natural History Museum. Despite the name, the museum is not a national museum of China.

The museum has been publishing the bimonthly journal Da Ziran (大自然; lit. 'Great Nature') since 1980. The museum has total floor space of 24,000 square meters, of which 8,000 square meters are available for display and owns more than 200,000 specimens. The major display area is the Tian Jiabing Building. The collections include paleontology, ornithology, mammals and invertebrates, and include a major collection of dinosaur fossils and mounted skeletons. The museum also engages in significant scientific research in these areas.

== Major specimens and exhibitions ==
=== Fossil Galleries ===
There are three galleries devoted to paleontology in the museum. In the Mesozoic gallery, a large bronze model of the ancient earth is set at the beginning of the gallery. In the center of the gallery, a large Mamenchisaurus skeleton is mounted, with multiple dromaeosaur skeletons darting around it. A Szechuanosaurus is also mounted in an upright stance. Also, skeletal mounts of both Bactrosaurus and Lufengosaurus are featured. In the back of the gallery, a Yangchuanosaurus is mounted attacking a Tuojiangosaurus. The gallery also features many feathered dinosaurs from Liaoning, including specimens of Confuciusornis, Microraptor, and Anchiornis. The gallery connects to a large exhibit with animatronic dinosaurs and a smaller gallery housing dinosaur eggs.

The Cenozoic gallery has multiple mounts of Paraceratherium, Stegodon, and Megaloceros. Also on display is a skull of a woolly mammoth. In a glass case, a skeleton of an entelodont is featured. Also on display are skulls of several prehistoric mammals, including Homotherium, Megaloceros, and Elasmotherium.

There is also a gallery showcasing early life on earth. There is a large sculpture showing an Anomalocaris, along with trilobites and a Hallucigenia bursting out of the floor. There is a display of ammonites arranged in a helix shell. There are also many fossils from the Cambrian explosion.

== Gallery ==
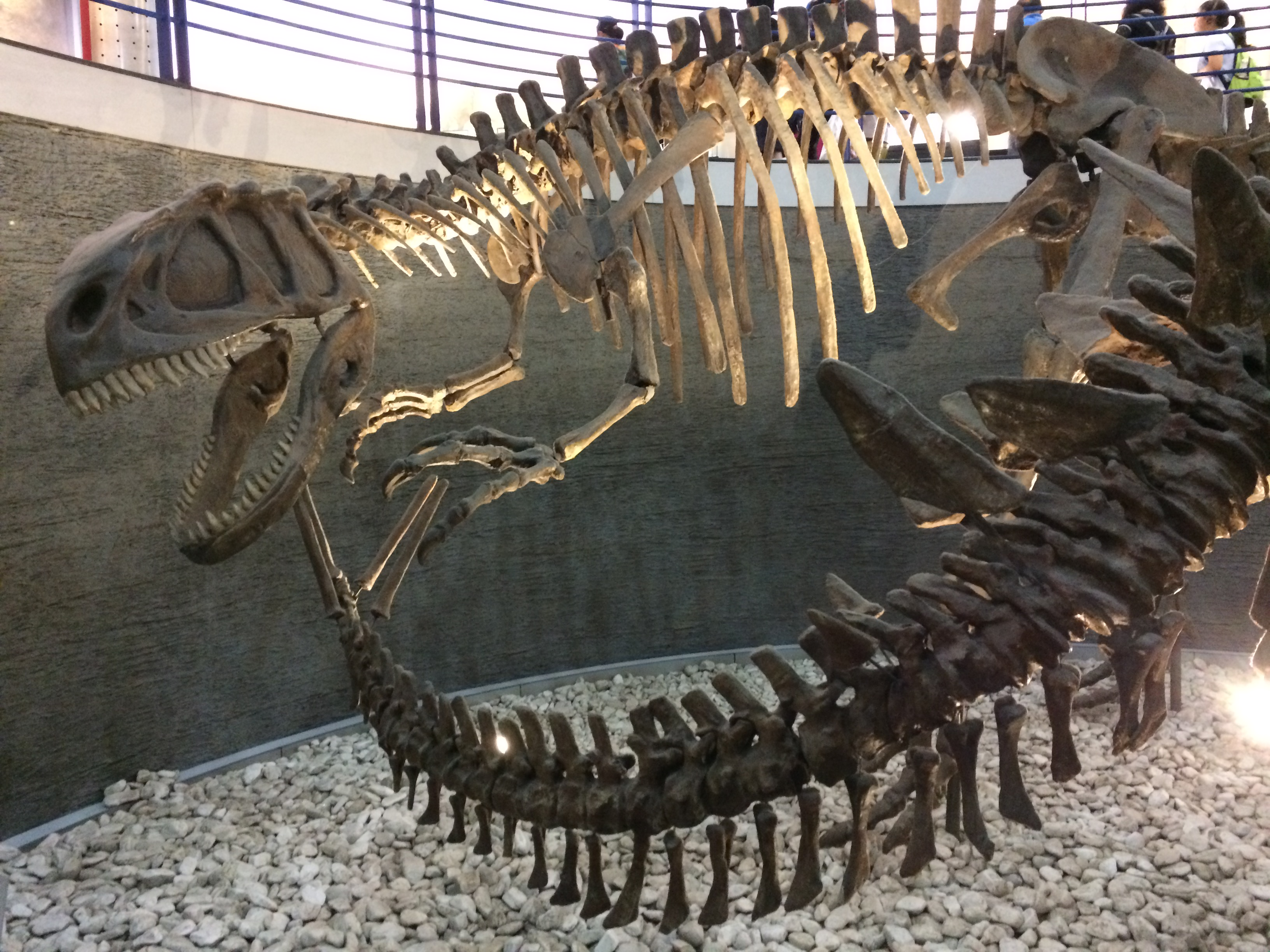
Mounted skeletons of Yangchuanosaurus and Tuojiangosaurus.

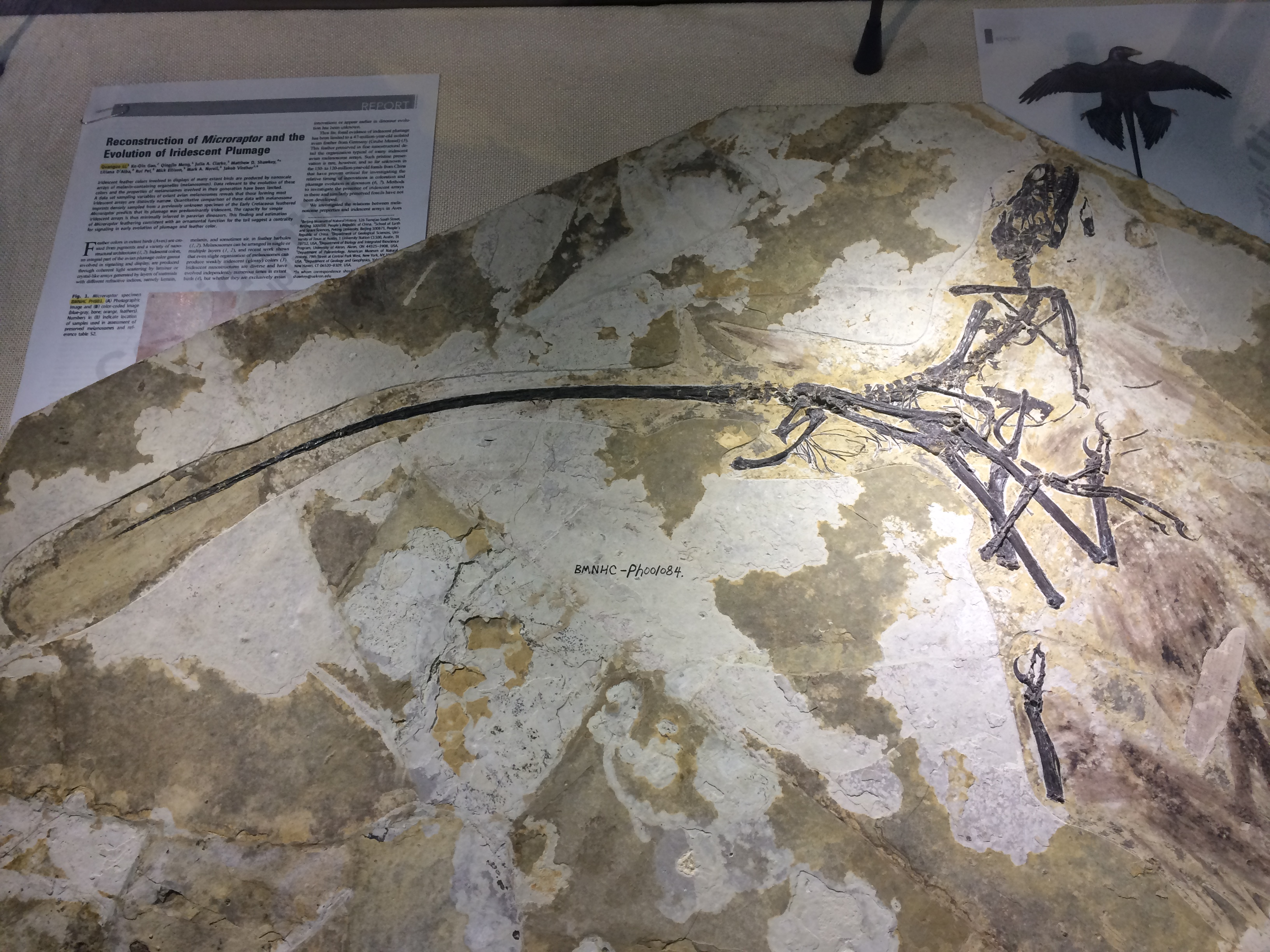
Microraptor specimen on the second floor.

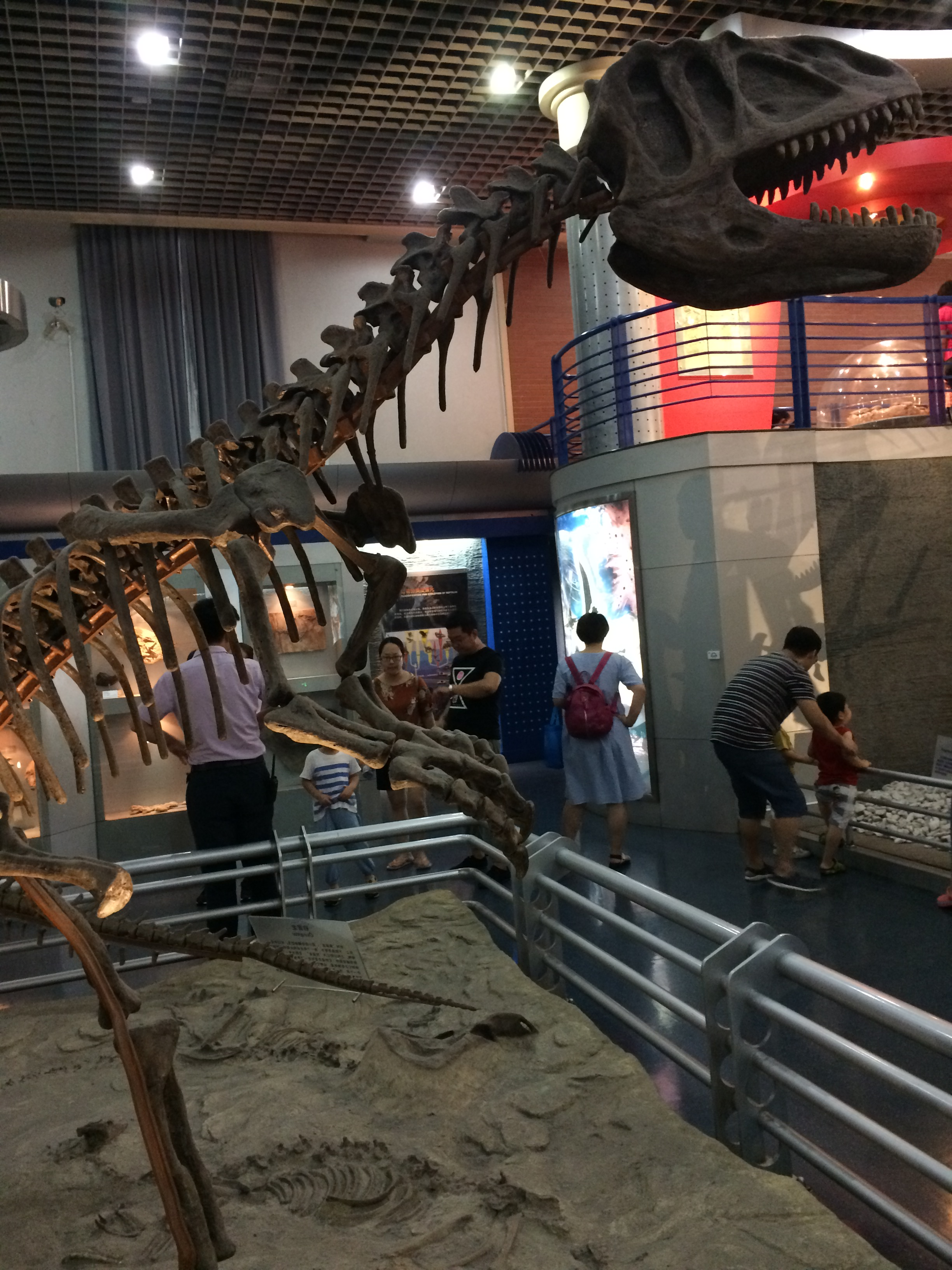
Mounted skeleton of Szechuanosaurus.

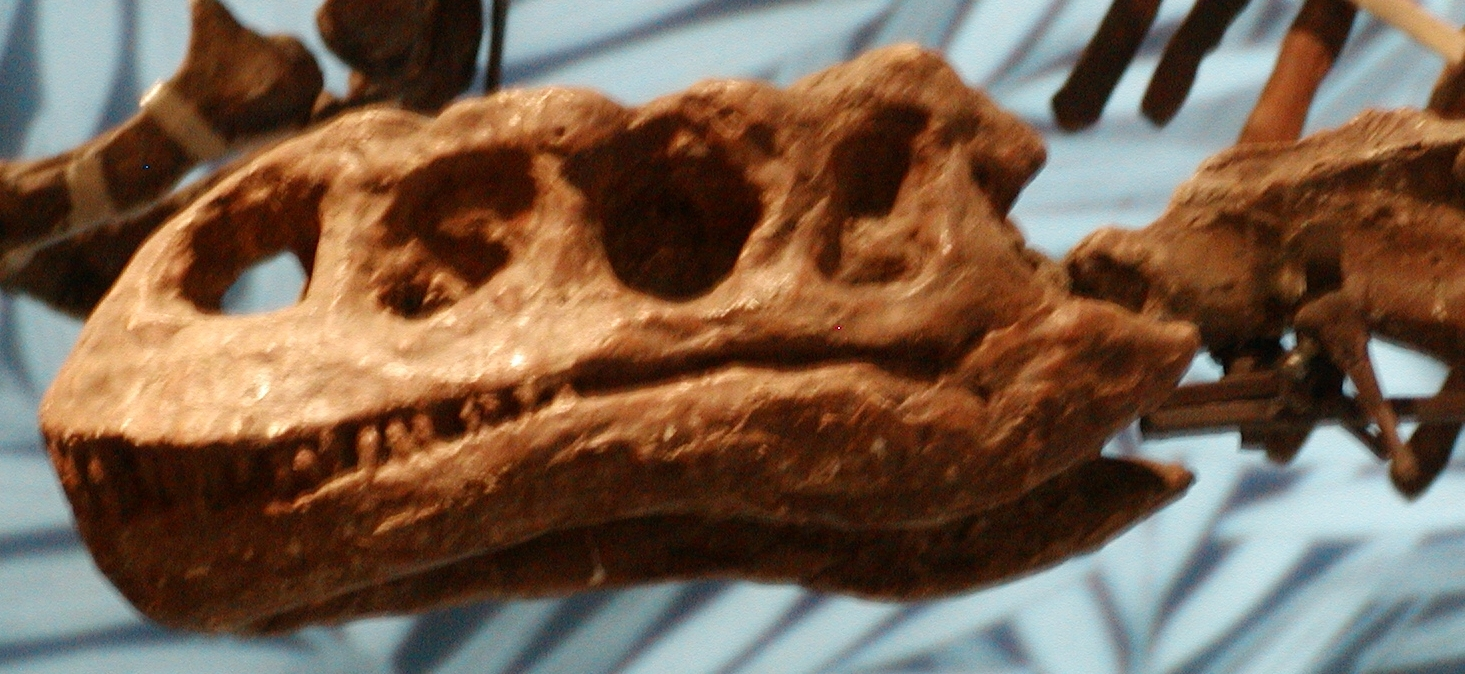
Skull of Lufengosaurus magnus.

== See also ==
- List of museums in China
- List of natural history museums
