= Hepingmen =

Gate in Beijing's former city wall

Coordinates: 32°06′N 118°47′E

Hepingmen (simplified Chinese: 和平门; traditional Chinese: 和平門; pinyin: Hépíngmén), literally meaning the Gate of Peace, was a gate in Beijing's former city wall. In the 1960s, the gate was torn down to make room for Beijing's second ring road. Today, Hepingmen is a transport node in Beijing as well as the location of Hepingmen Station on Line 2 of Beijing's subway system.
