= Hufangqiao station =

Beijing Subway station

Hufangqiao 虎坊桥
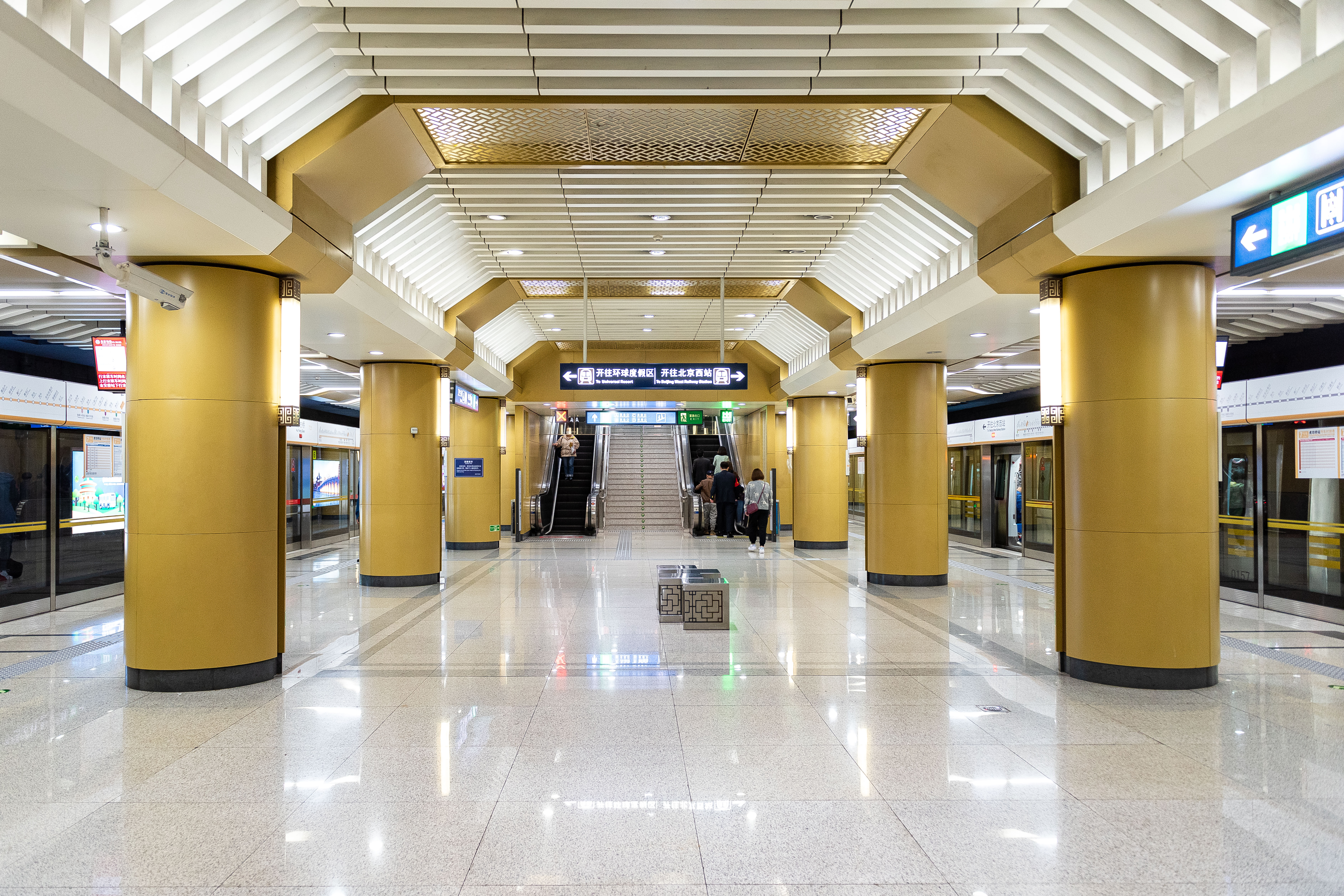
- Platform

General information
- Location: Luomashi Street / Zhushikou West Street and South Xinhua Street / Hufang Road; Xicheng District, Beijing; China
- Coordinates: 39.8895°N 116.3847°E
- Operator: Beijing Mass Transit Railway Operation Corporation Limited
- Line: Line 7
- Platforms: 2 (1 island platform)
- Tracks: 2

Construction
- Structure type: Underground
- Accessible: Yes

History
- Opened: December 28, 2014; 11 years ago

Services
Preceding station	Beijing Subway	Following station
Caishi Kou towards Beijing West railway station	Line 7	Zhushikou towards Universal Resort
Location
- Location within Beijing

Hufangqiao Station (simplified Chinese: 虎坊桥站; traditional Chinese: 虎坊橋站; pinyin: Hǔfāngqiáo Zhàn) is a station on Line 7 of the Beijing Subway. It was opened on December 28, 2014 as a part of the stretch between Beijing West railway station and Jiaohuachang and is located between Caishikou and Zhushikou.

== First and last time ==
- Beijing West Railway Station — Hua Zhuang
  - The first train 5:41
  - The last train 23:26
- Hua Zhuang — Beijing West Railway Station
  - The first train 5:41
  - The last train 22:56

== Station layout ==
The station has an underground island platform.

== Exits ==
There are 4 exits, lettered A, B, C, and D. Exits A and C are accessible.
