= Zhushikou station =

Beijing Subway station

Coordinates: 39.8912°N 116.3982°E

Zhushikou 珠市口
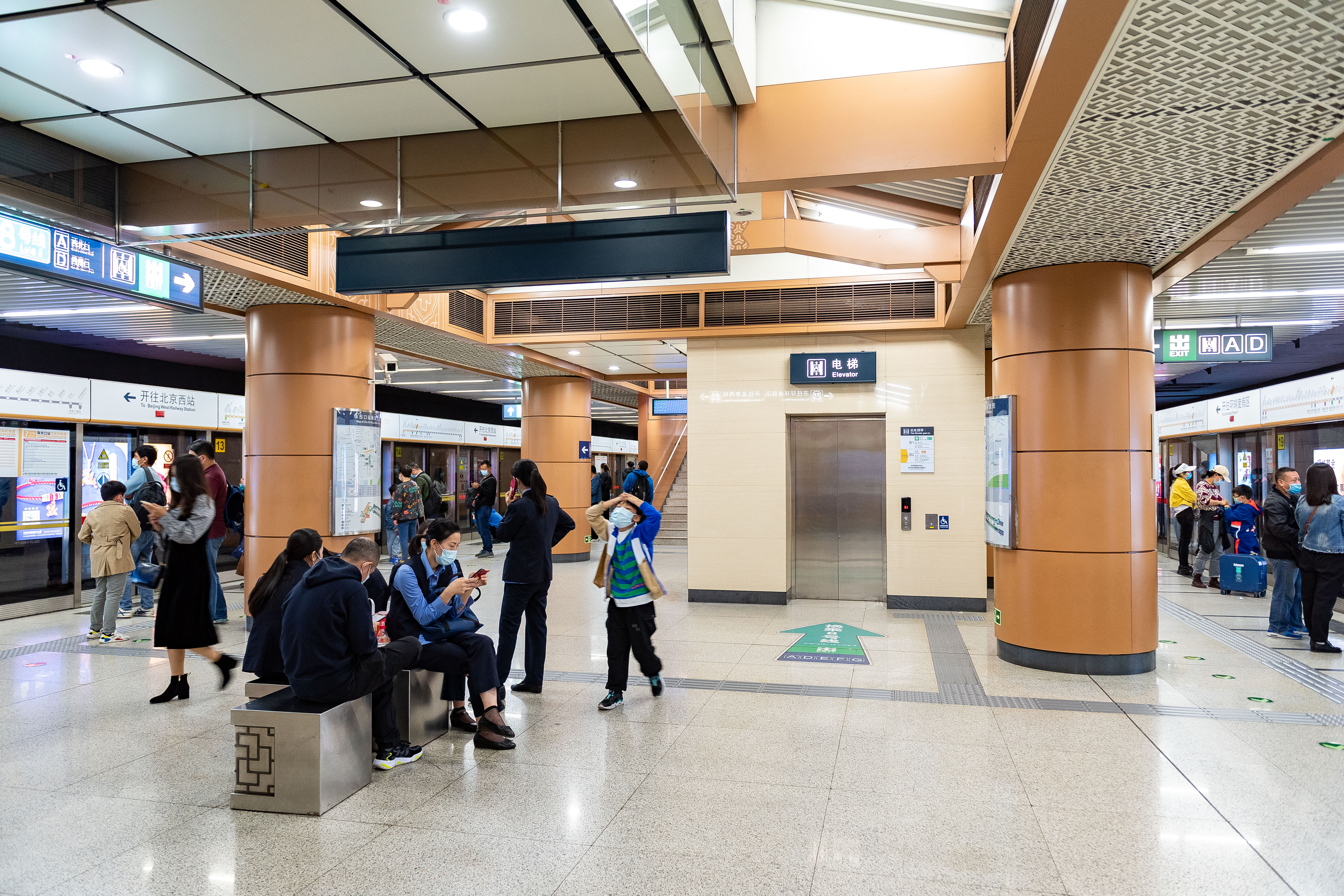
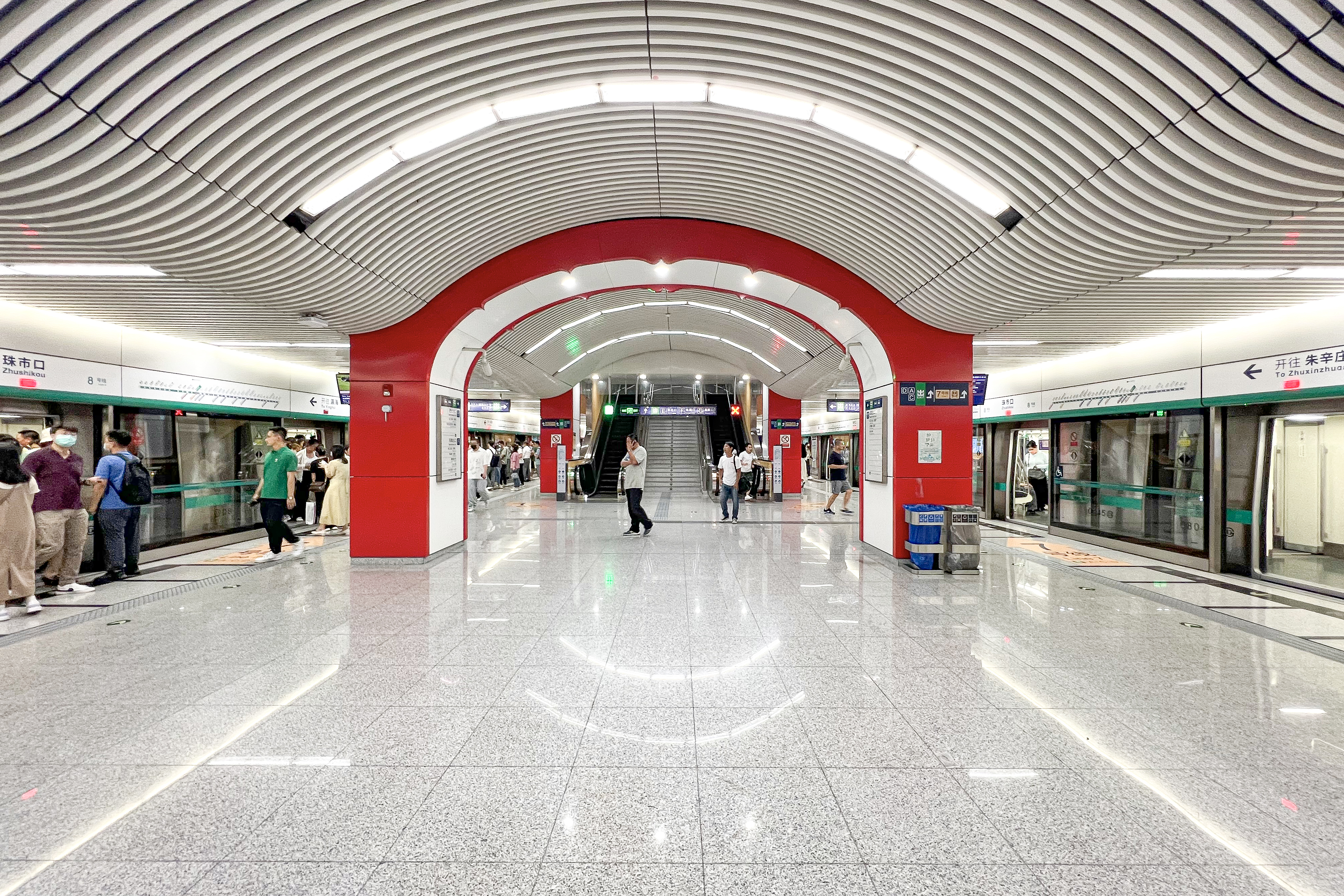
- Line 7 platform Line 8 platform

General information
- Location: Zhushikou West Street (珠市口西大街) / Zhushikou East Street (珠市口东大街) and Qianmen Street; Xicheng District / Dongcheng District border, Beijing; China
- Operator: Beijing Mass Transit Railway Operation Corporation Limited
- Lines: Line 7; Line 8
- Platforms: 4 (2 island platforms)
- Tracks: 4

Construction
- Structure type: Underground
- Accessible: Yes

History
- Opened: December 28, 2014; 11 years ago (Line 7); December 30, 2018; 7 years ago (Line 8)

Services
Preceding station	Beijing Subway	Following station
Hufangqiao towards Beijing West railway station	Line 7	Qiaowan towards Universal Resort
Qianmen towards Zhuxinzhuang	Line 8	Tianqiao towards Yinghai
Location
- Location within Beijing

Zhushikou station (Chinese: 珠市口站; pinyin: Zhūshìkǒu zhàn) is an interchange station on Line 7 and Line 8 of the Beijing Subway.

The Line 7 station was opened on December 28, 2014. The Line 8 station was opened on December 30, 2018. This station served as the temporary northern terminus of the south section of line 8 until December 31, 2021, when both north and south sections of Line 8 were connected.

== Station layout ==
Both the line 7 and 8 stations have underground island platforms. The line 7 platforms are located a level under the line 8 platforms.

== Exits ==
There are six exits, lettered A, C, D, E, F, and G. Exit D is accessible.

== Gallery ==
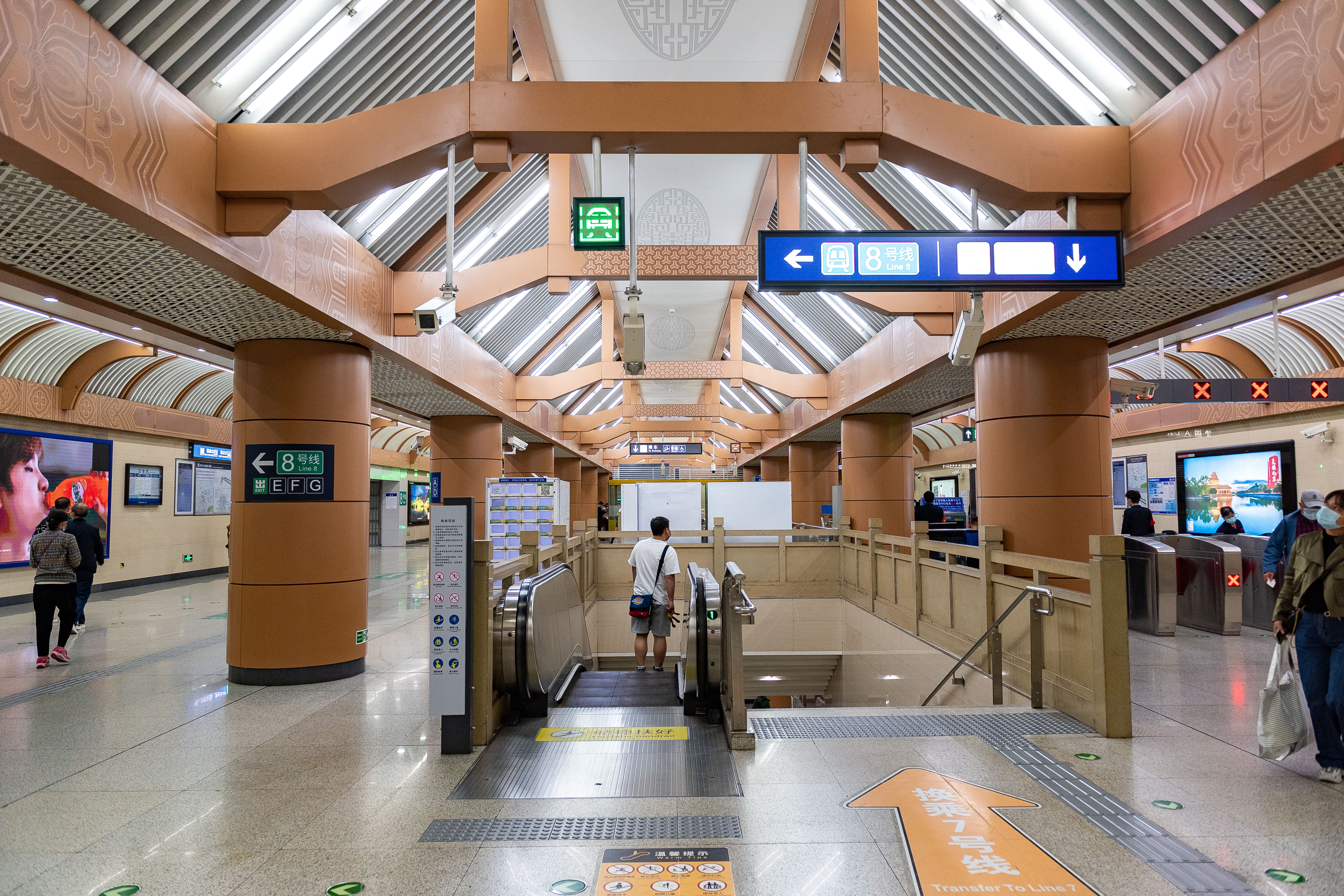
Line 7 west concourse

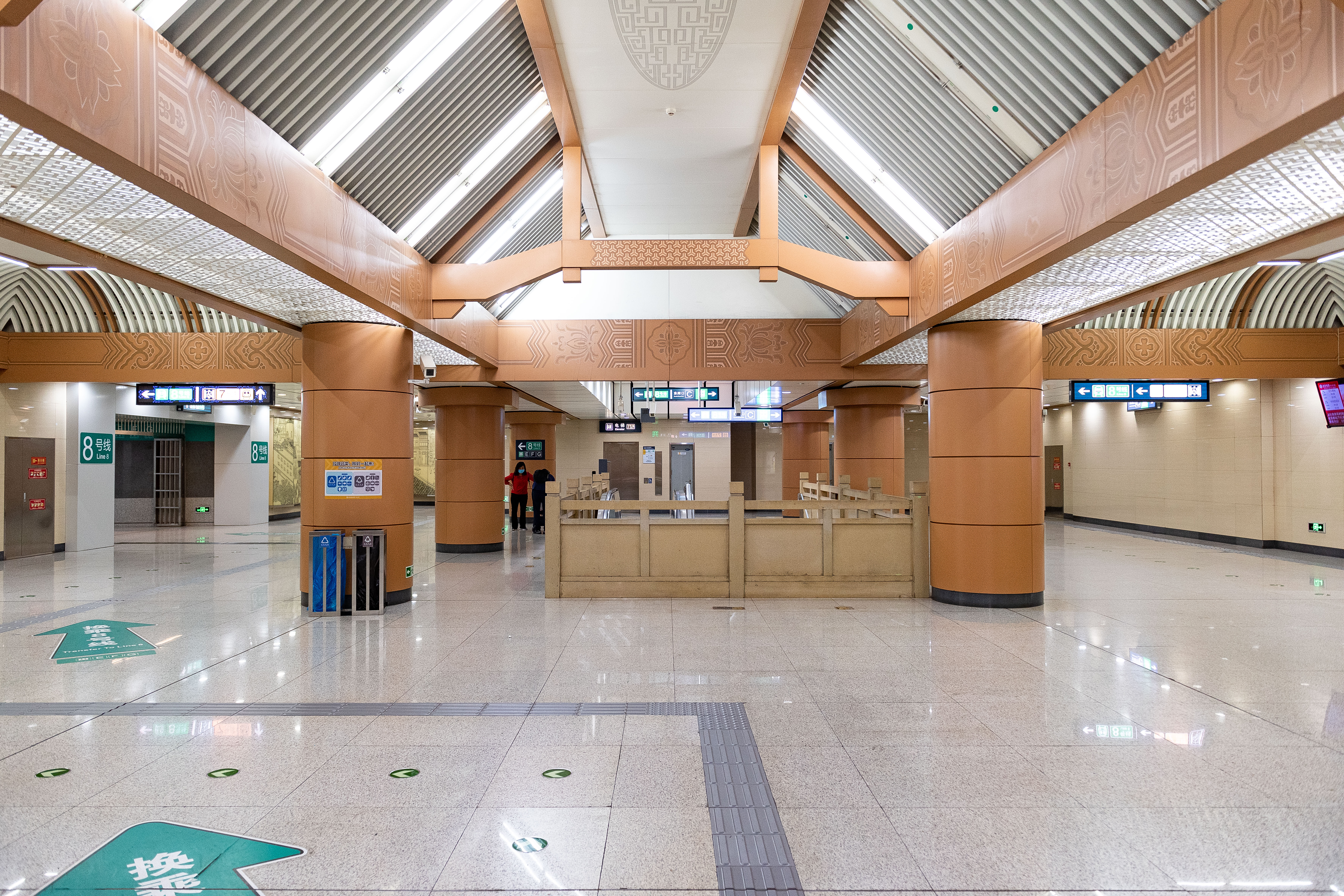
Line 7 east concourse

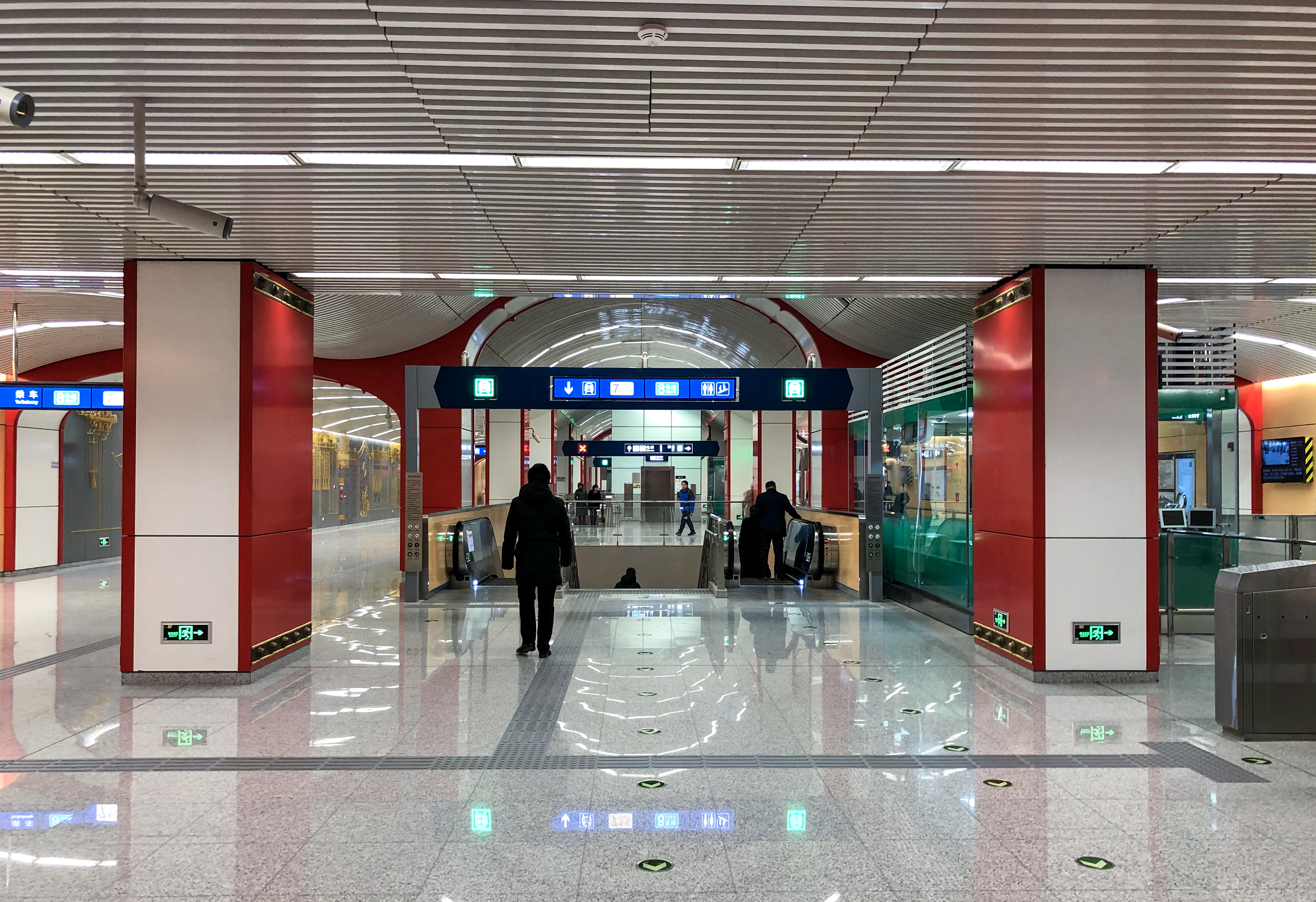
Line 8 Concourse

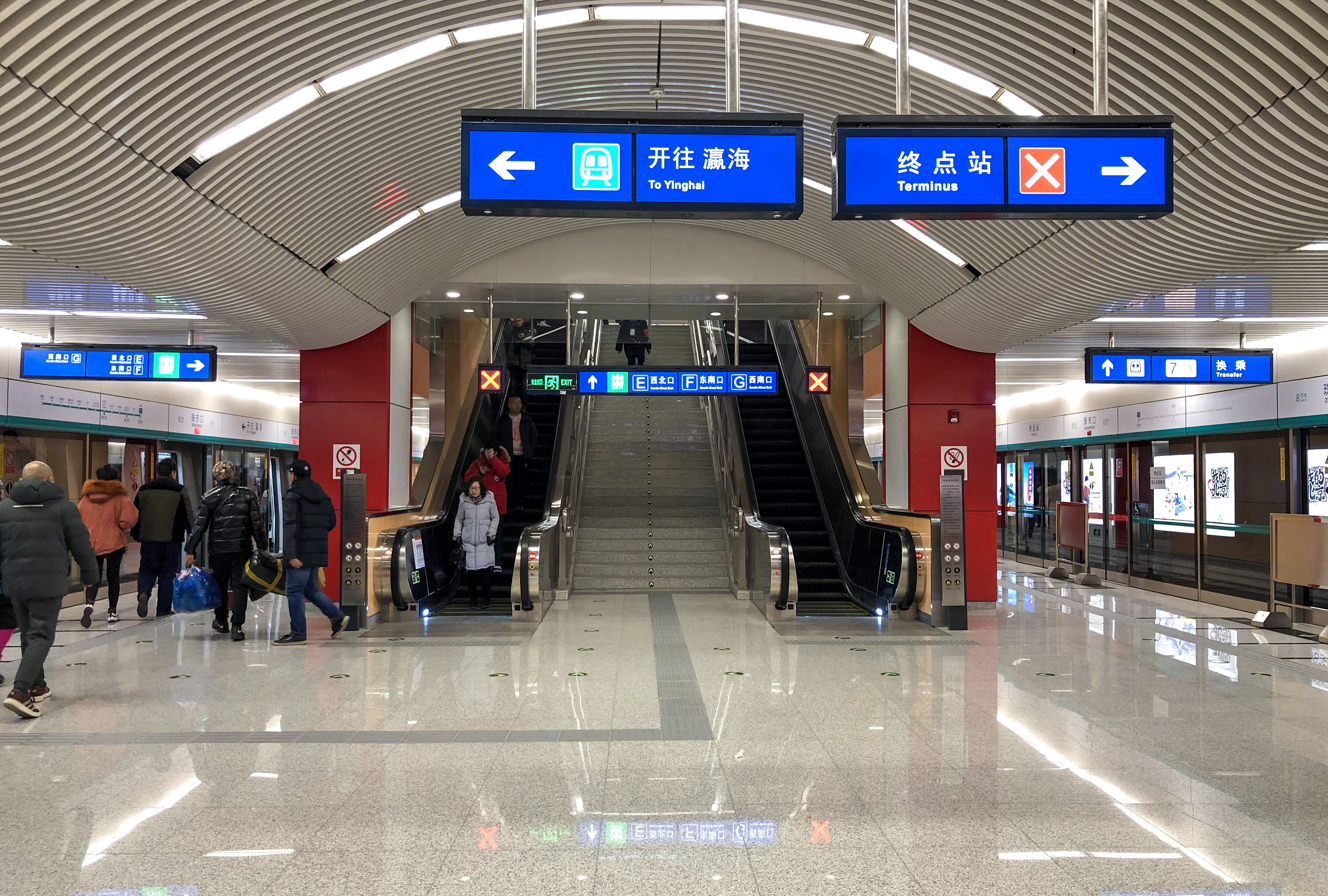
Line 8 Platform with Sign
