= Qianmen station =

Beijing Subway station

Qianmen 前门
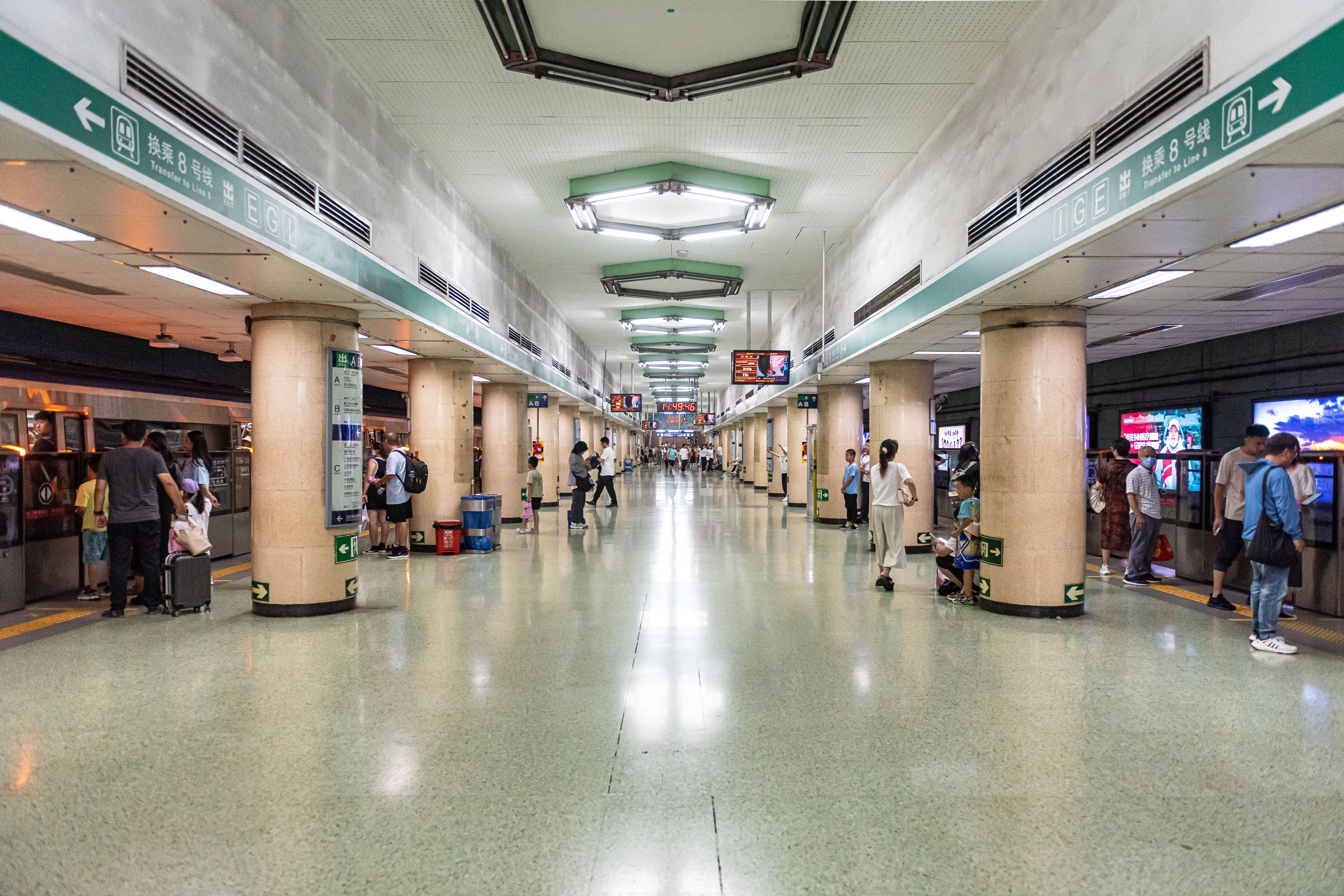
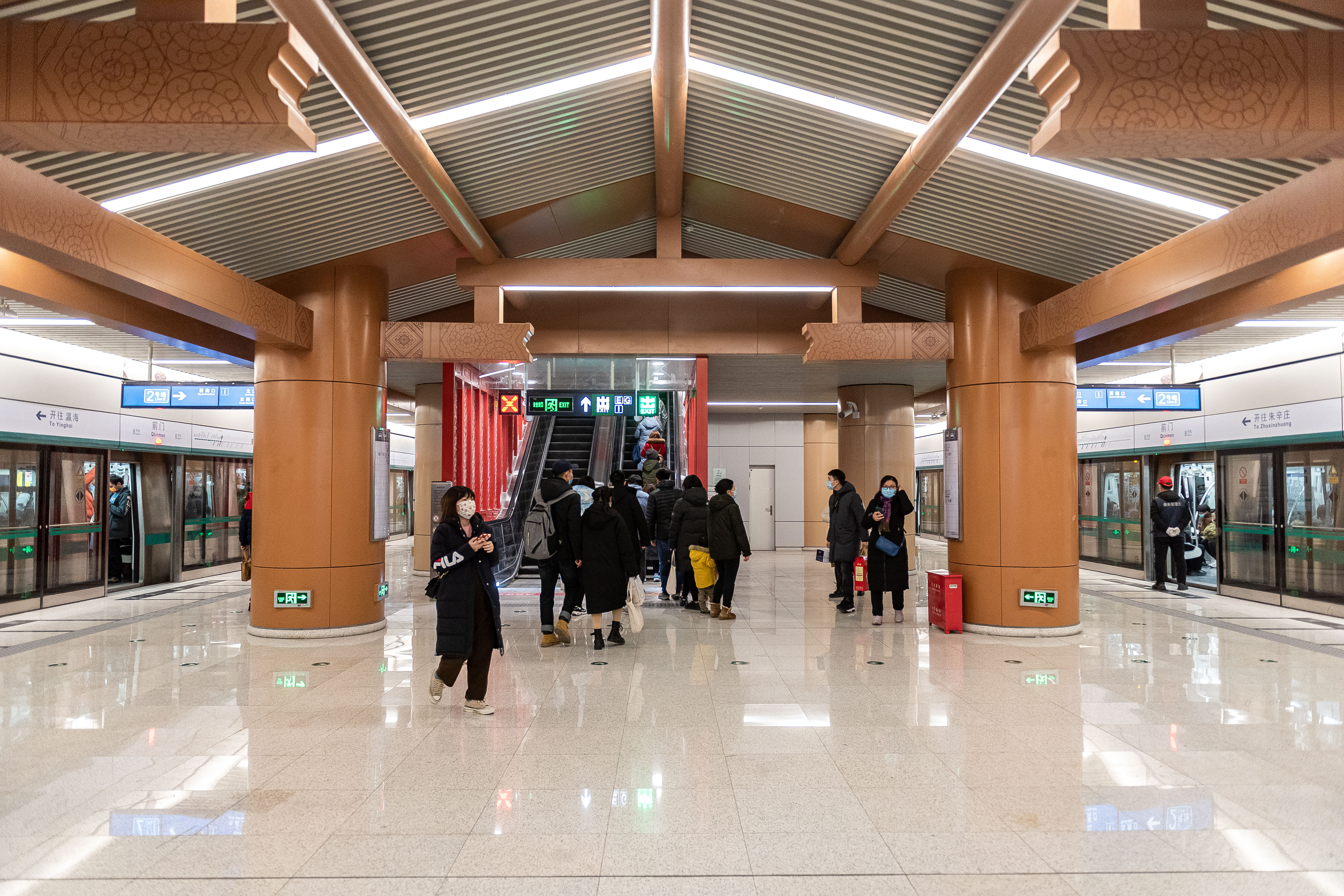
- Line 2 platform Line 8 platform

General information
- Location: Zhengyangmen underneath Qianmen West Street and Qianmen East Street (前门东大街); Dongcheng District, Beijing; China
- Coordinates: 39.898653°N 116.391659°E
- Operator: Beijing Mass Transit Railway Operation Corporation Limited
- Lines: Line 2 Line 8
- Platforms: 4 (2 island platforms)
- Tracks: 4

Construction
- Structure type: Underground
- Accessible: Yes

Other information
- Station code: 208 (Line 2)

History
- Opened: January 15, 1971; 55 years ago (Line 2); December 31, 2021; 4 years ago (Line 8)

Services
Preceding station	Beijing Subway	Following station
Chongwen Men outer loop / anticlockwise	Line 2	Heping Men inner loop / clockwise
Wangfujing towards Zhuxinzhuang	Line 8	Zhushikou towards Yinghai
Location
- Location within Beijing

Qianmen station (simplified Chinese: 前门站; traditional Chinese: 前門站; pinyin: Qiánmén zhàn) is a station on Line 2 and Line 8 of the Beijing Subway located near Qianmen.

== Station layout ==
Both the line 2 and line 8 stations have island platforms.

== Exits ==
There are three exits, lettered A, B, and C. Exit A is accessible via an elevator.

== Gallery ==
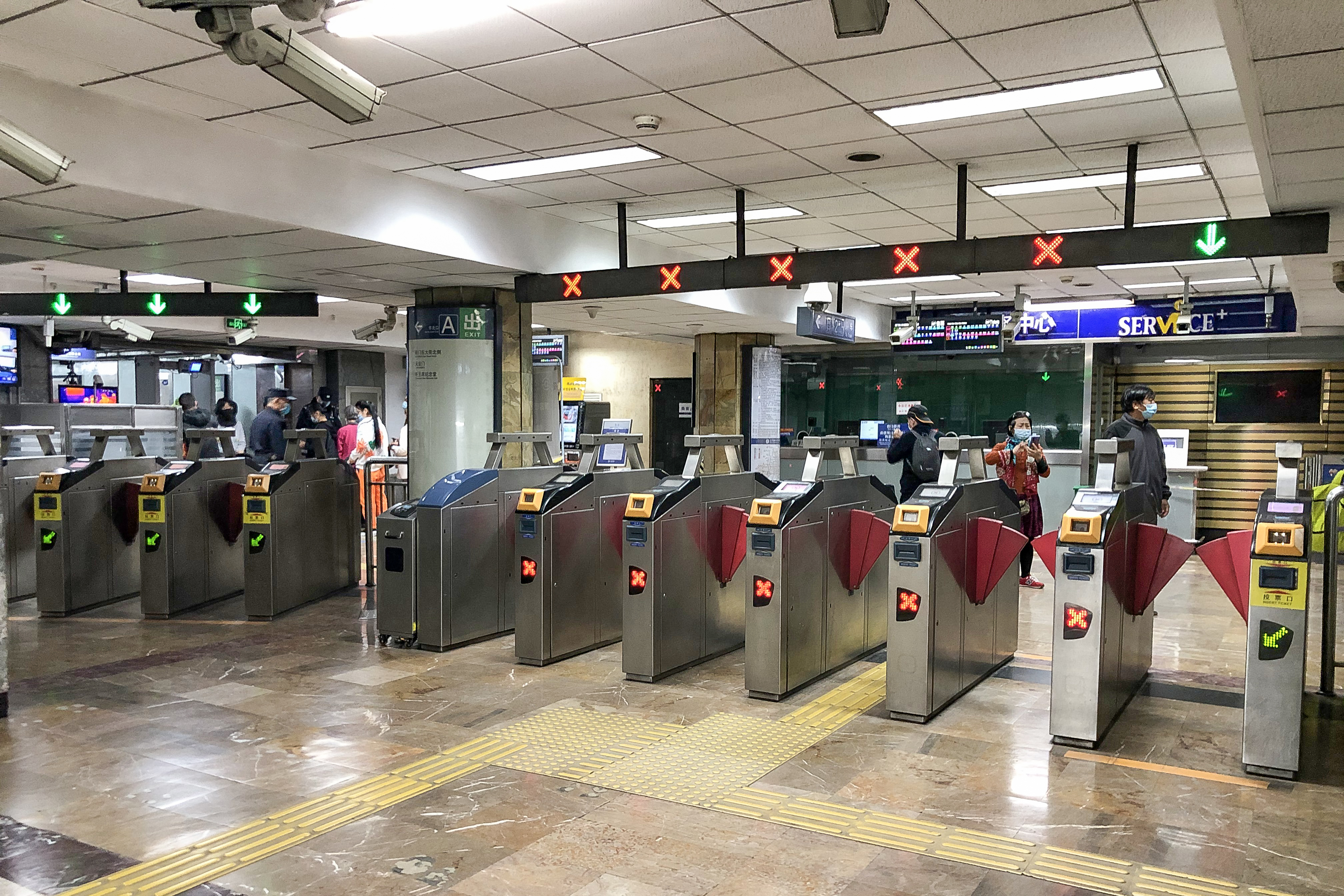
Line 2 east concourse (April 2021)

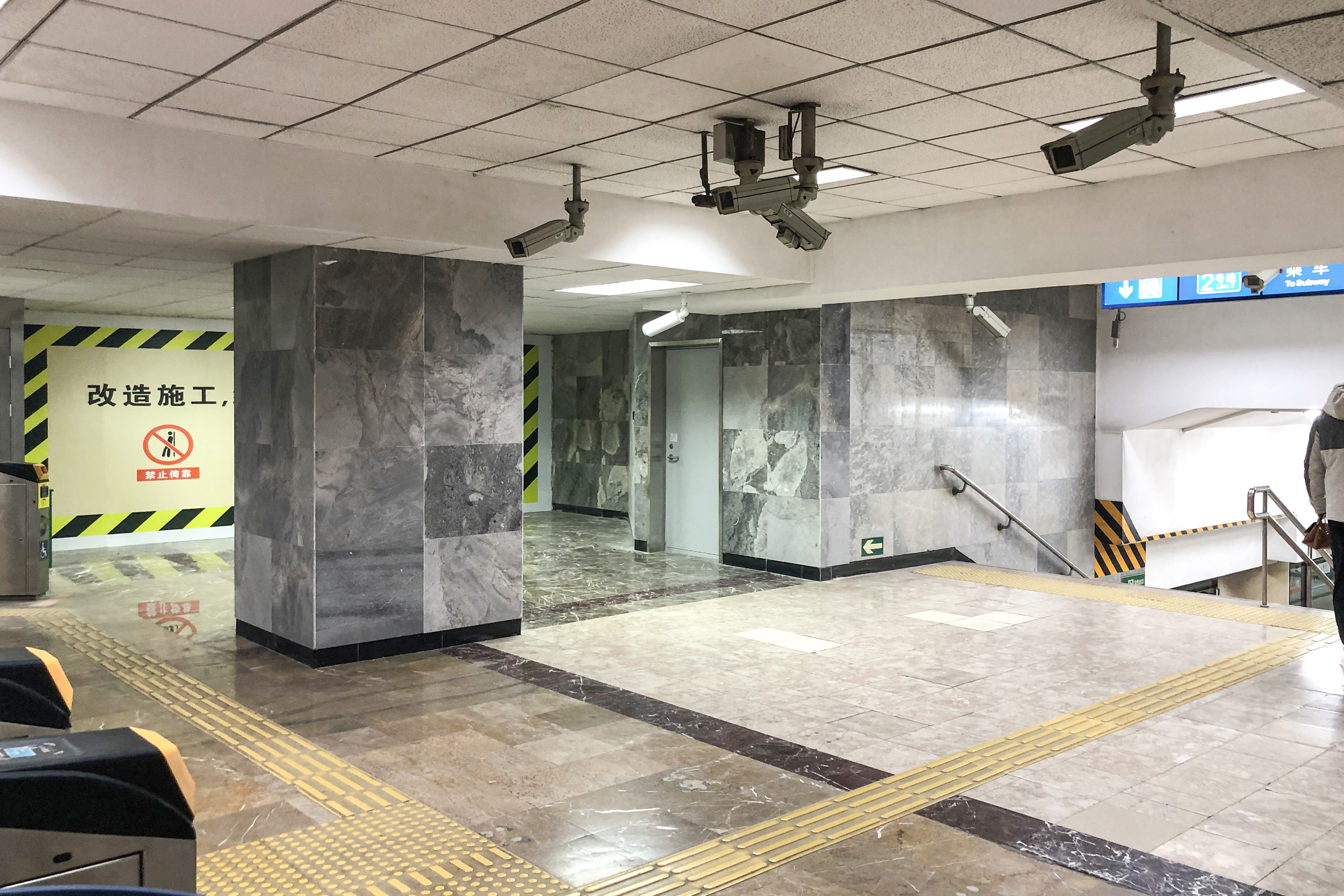
Line 2 east concourse (November 2021)

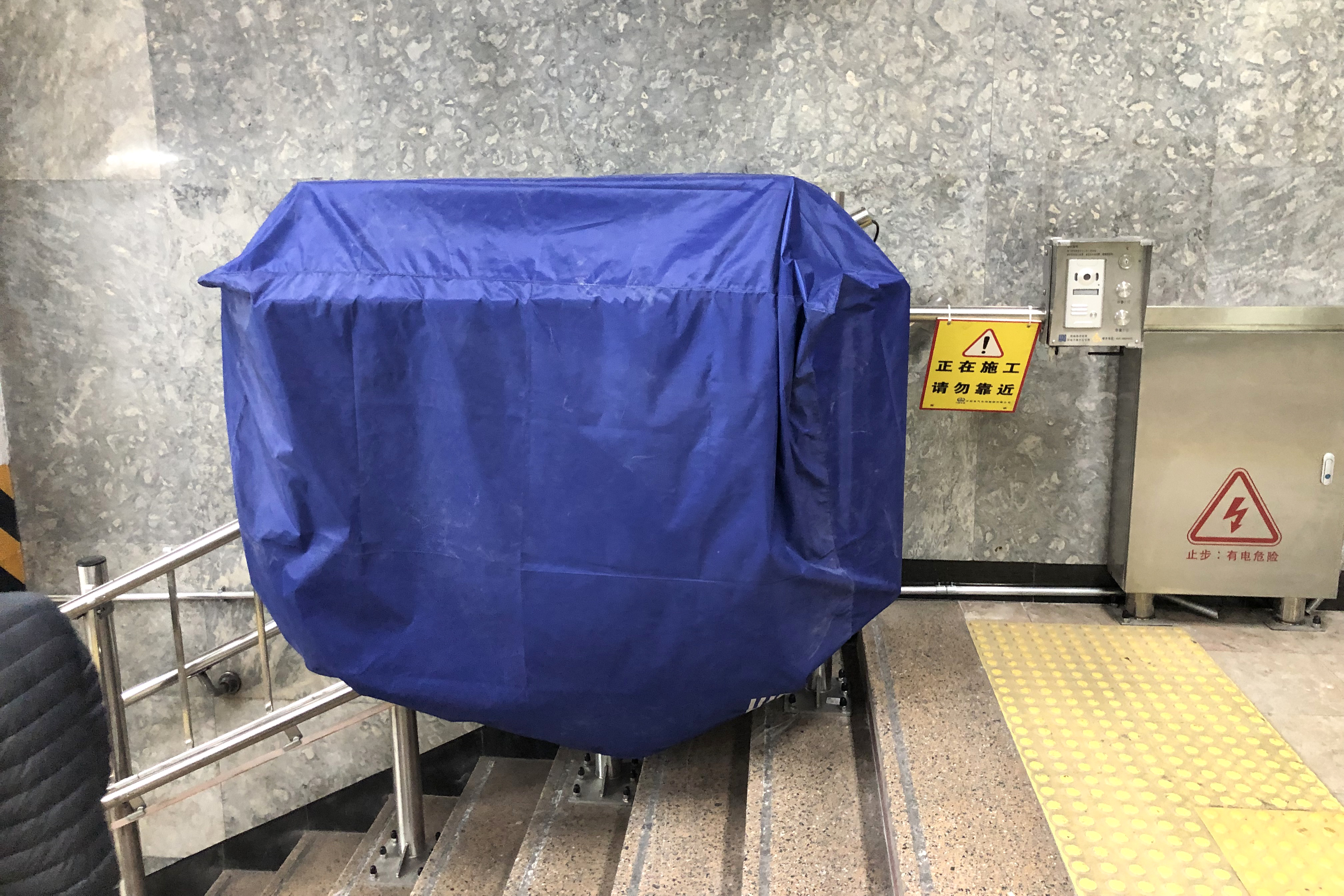
Line 2 east concourse stairlift

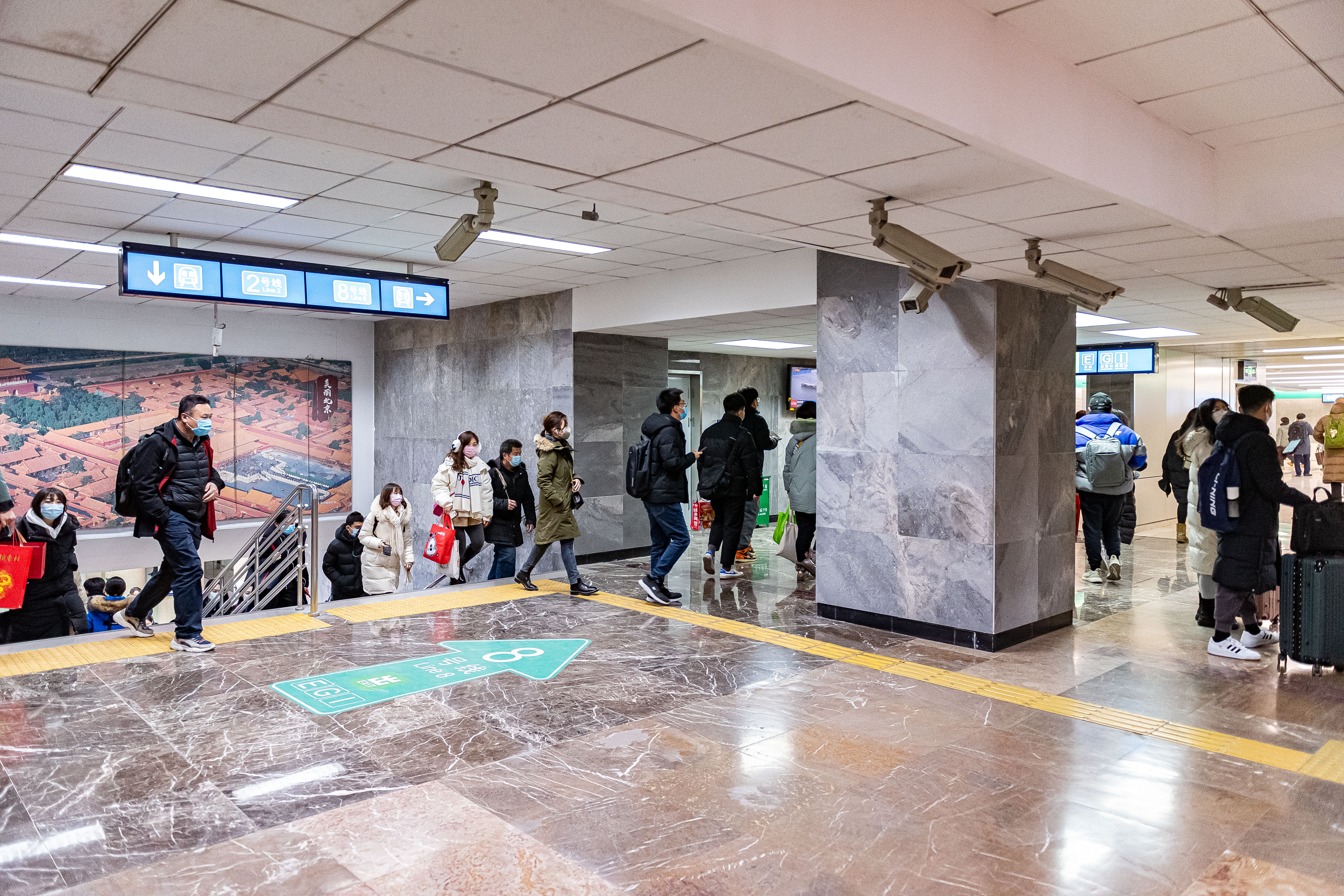
Line 2 west concourse

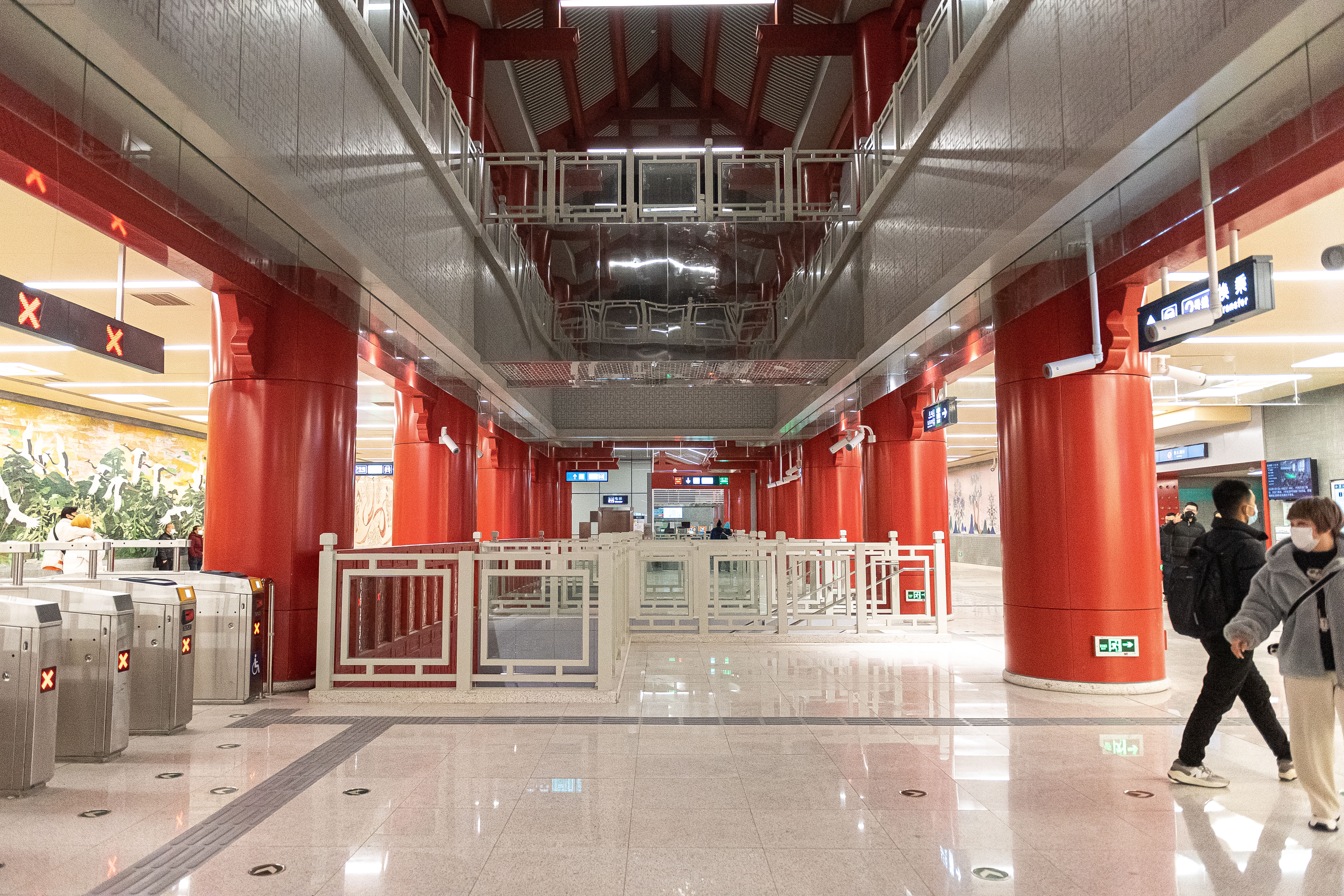
Line 8 concourse

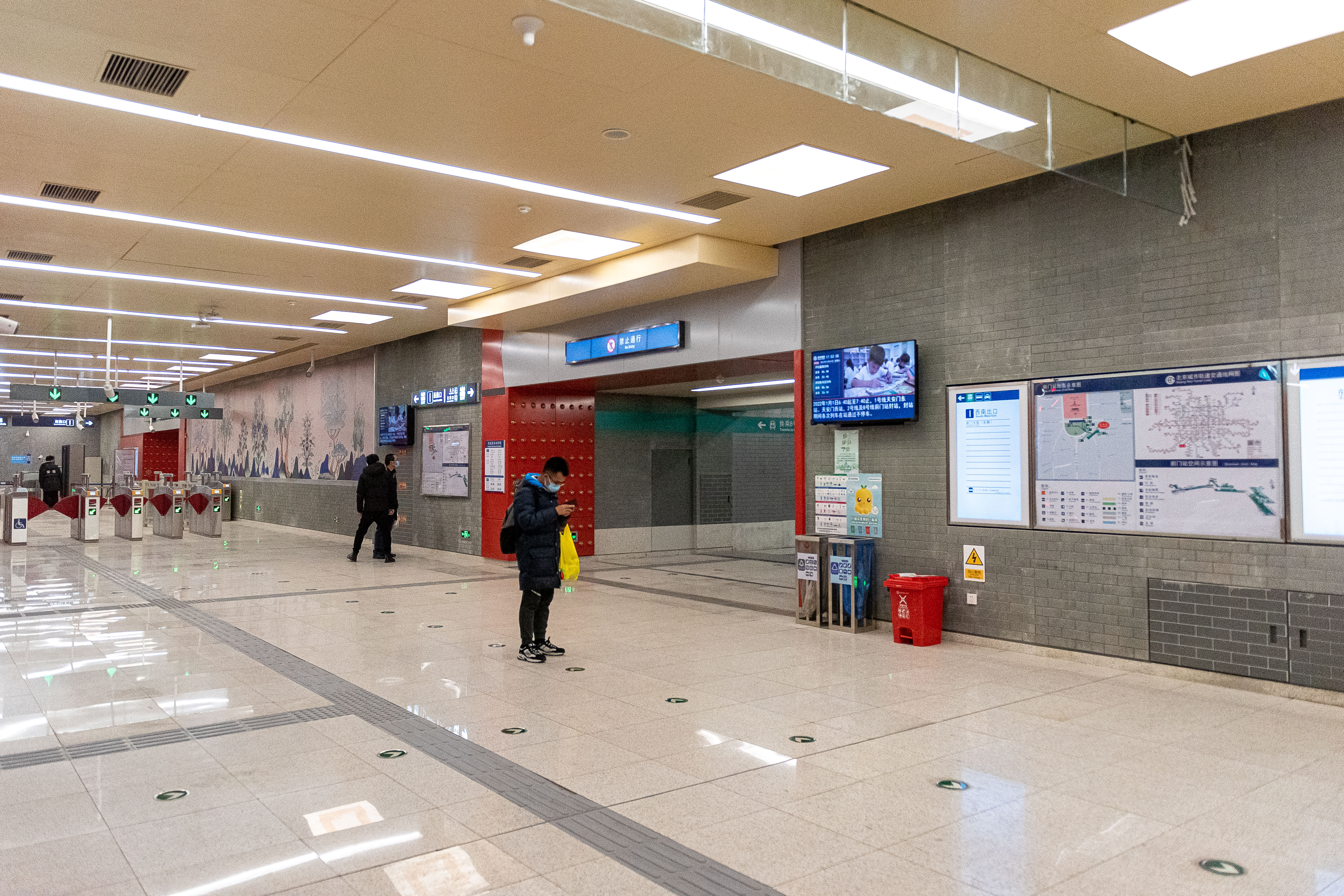
Interchange interface

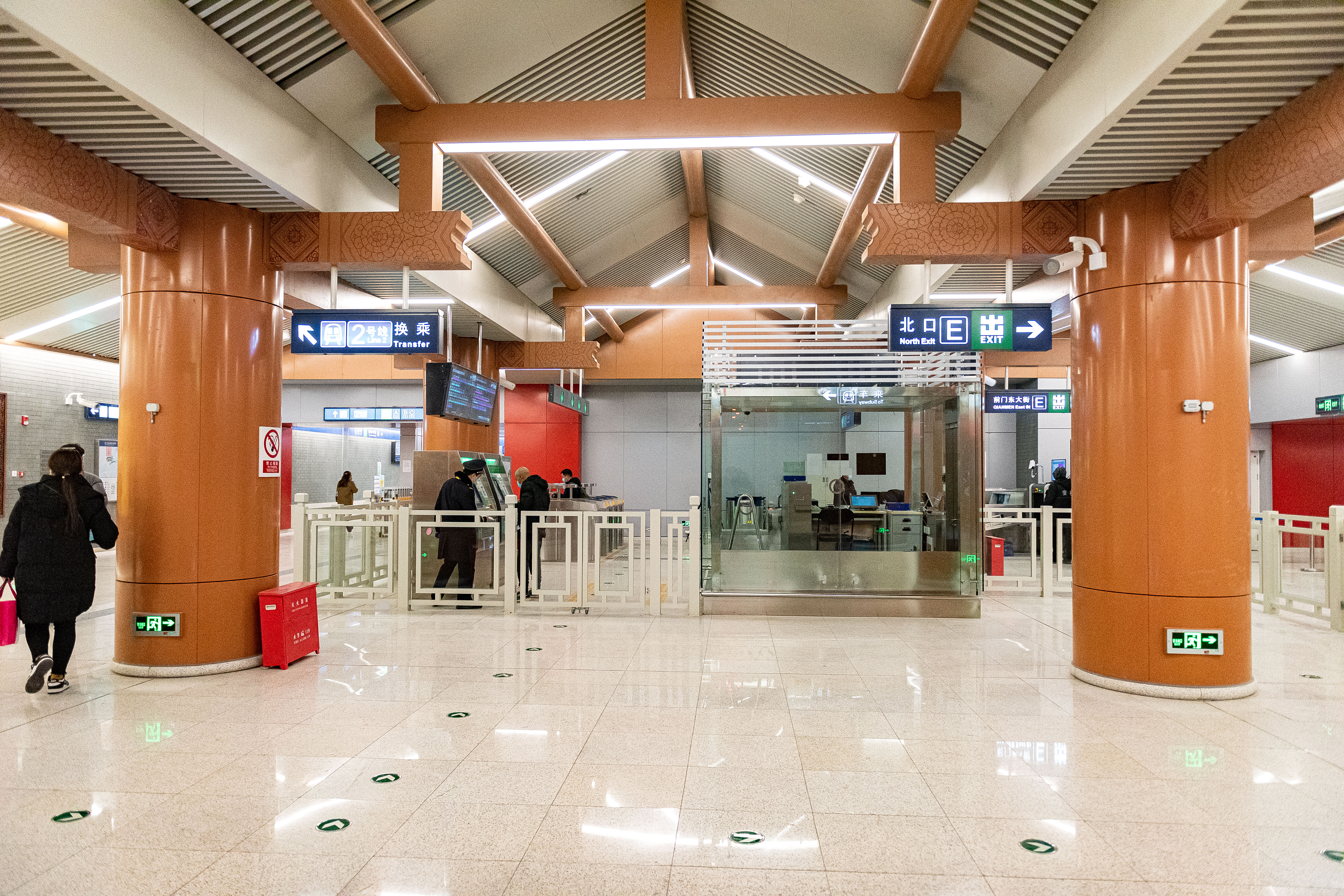
B2 level interchange corridor

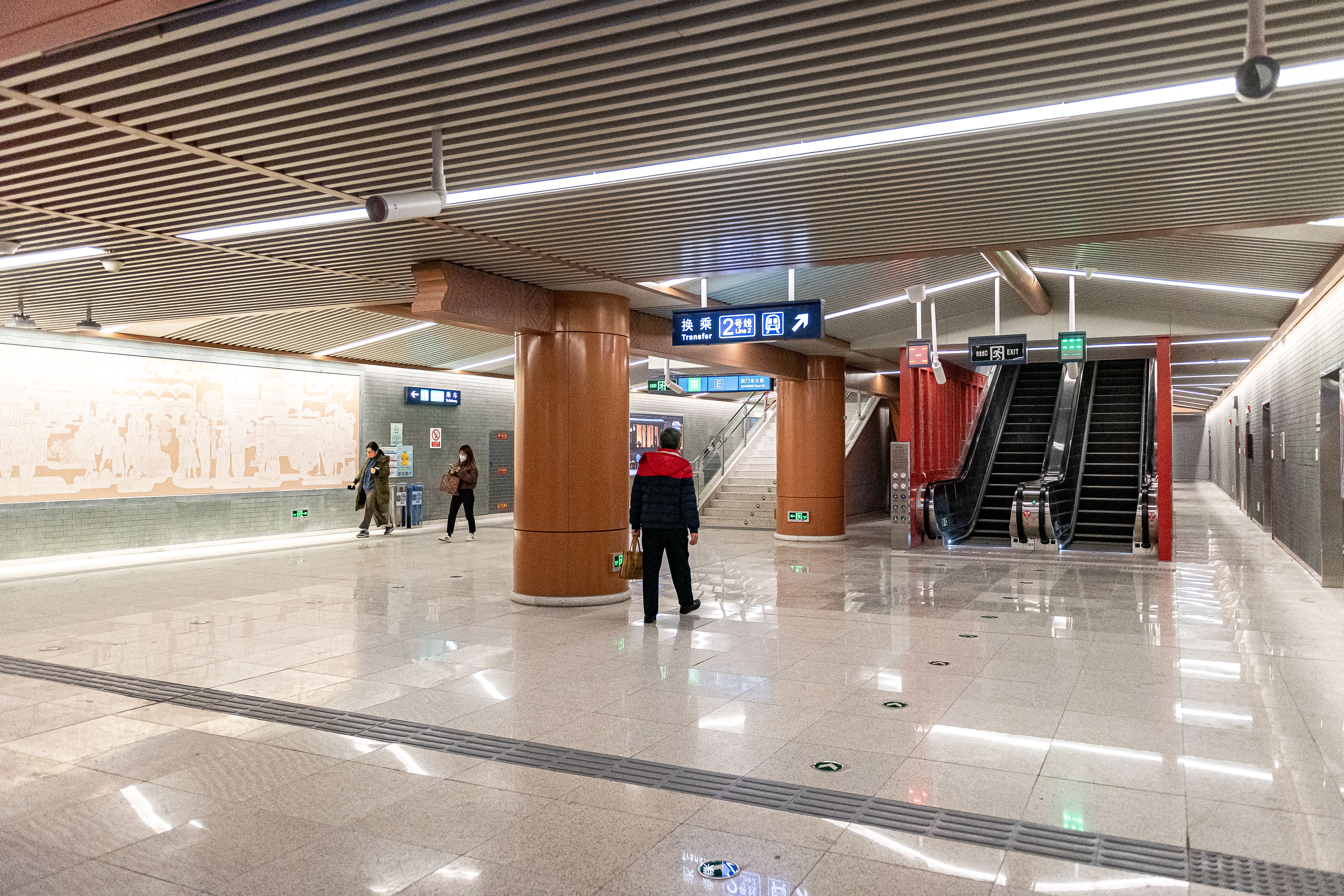
B3 level interchange corridor
