= Muxi Yuan station =

Beijing Subway station

Muxi Yuan 木樨园
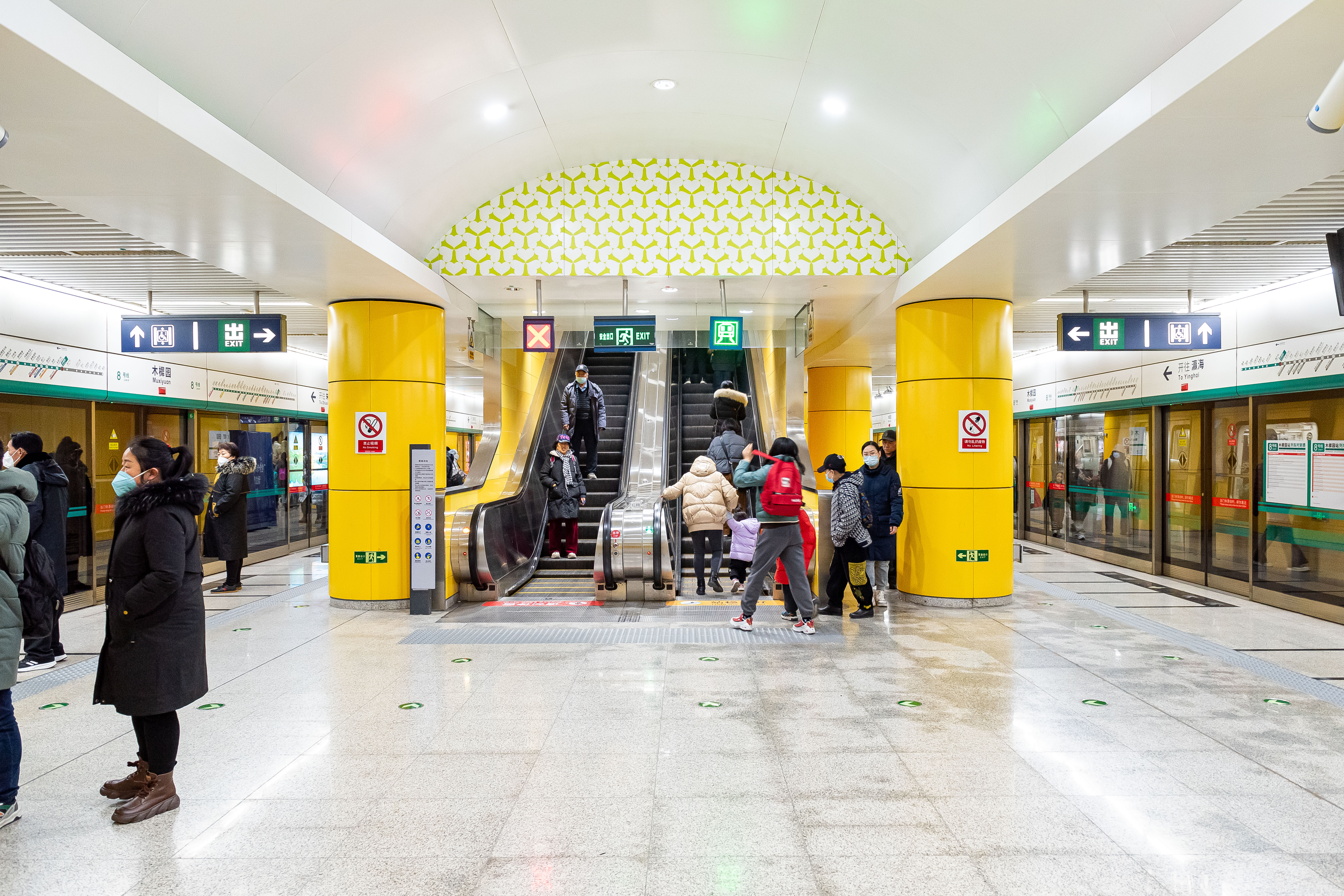
- Platform

General information
- Other names: Muxiyuanqiao North (木樨园桥北)
- Location: Yongdingmenwai Subdistrict, Dongcheng District, Beijing; China
- Coordinates: 39.858673°N 116.393598°E
- Operator: Beijing Mass Transit Railway Operation Corporation Limited
- Line: Line 8
- Platforms: 2 (1 island platform)
- Tracks: 2

Construction
- Structure type: Underground
- Accessible: Yes

History
- Opened: December 30, 2018; 7 years ago

Services
Preceding station	Beijing Subway	Following station
Yongdingmenwai towards Zhuxinzhuang	Line 8	Haihutun towards Yinghai
Location
- Location within Beijing

Muxi Yuan station (Chinese: 木樨园站; pinyin: Mùxī Yuán zhàn) is a station on Line 8 of the Beijing Subway. It opened on December 30, 2018.

== Station layout ==
The station has an underground island platform.

== Exits ==
There are 5 exits, lettered A1, A2, B1, B2, and C. Exits A2 and B2 are accessible.
