= Haihutun station =

Beijing Subway station

Haihutun 海户屯
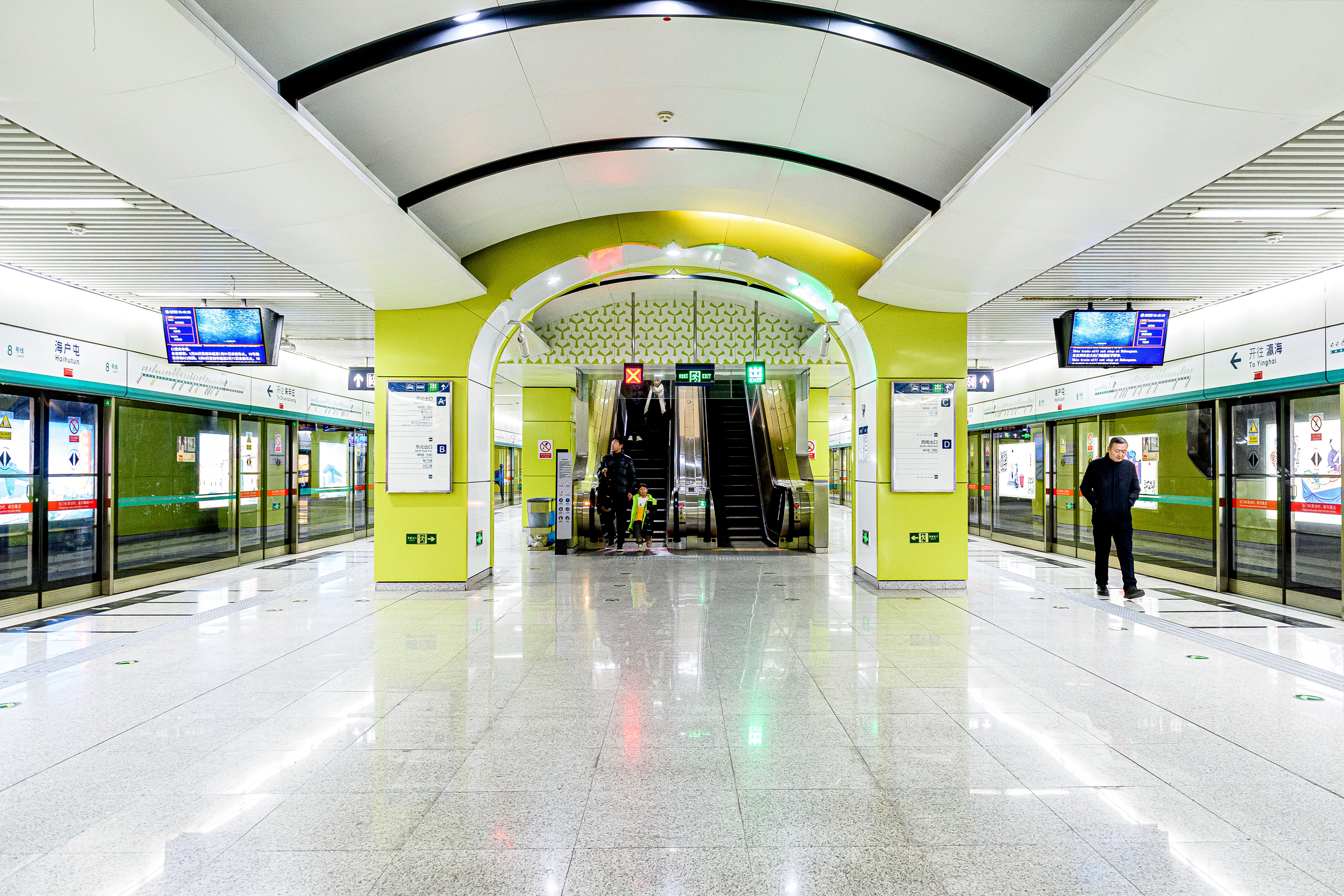
- Platform

General information
- Location: Nanyuan Road × Haihu Middle Road (海户中路)/Fenghai Street (丰海街); Dahongmen Subdistrict, Fengtai District, Beijing; China
- Coordinates: 39.8503°N 116.3940°E
- Operator: Beijing Mass Transit Railway Operation Corporation Limited
- Line: Line 8
- Platforms: 2 (1 island platform)
- Tracks: 2

Construction
- Structure type: Underground
- Accessible: Yes

History
- Opened: 30 December 2018

Services
Preceding station	Beijing Subway	Following station
Muxi Yuan towards Zhuxinzhuang	Line 8	Dahong Men towards Yinghai
Location
- Location within Beijing

Haihutun station (Chinese: 海户屯站; pinyin: Hǎihùtún zhàn) is a station on Line 8 of the Beijing Subway. It opened on 30 December 2018.

== Layout ==
The station has an underground island platform.

== Exits ==
There are four exits, lettered A2, B1, C, and D. Exits A2 and B1 are accessible.
