= Heping Men station =

Beijing Subway station

Heping Men 和平门
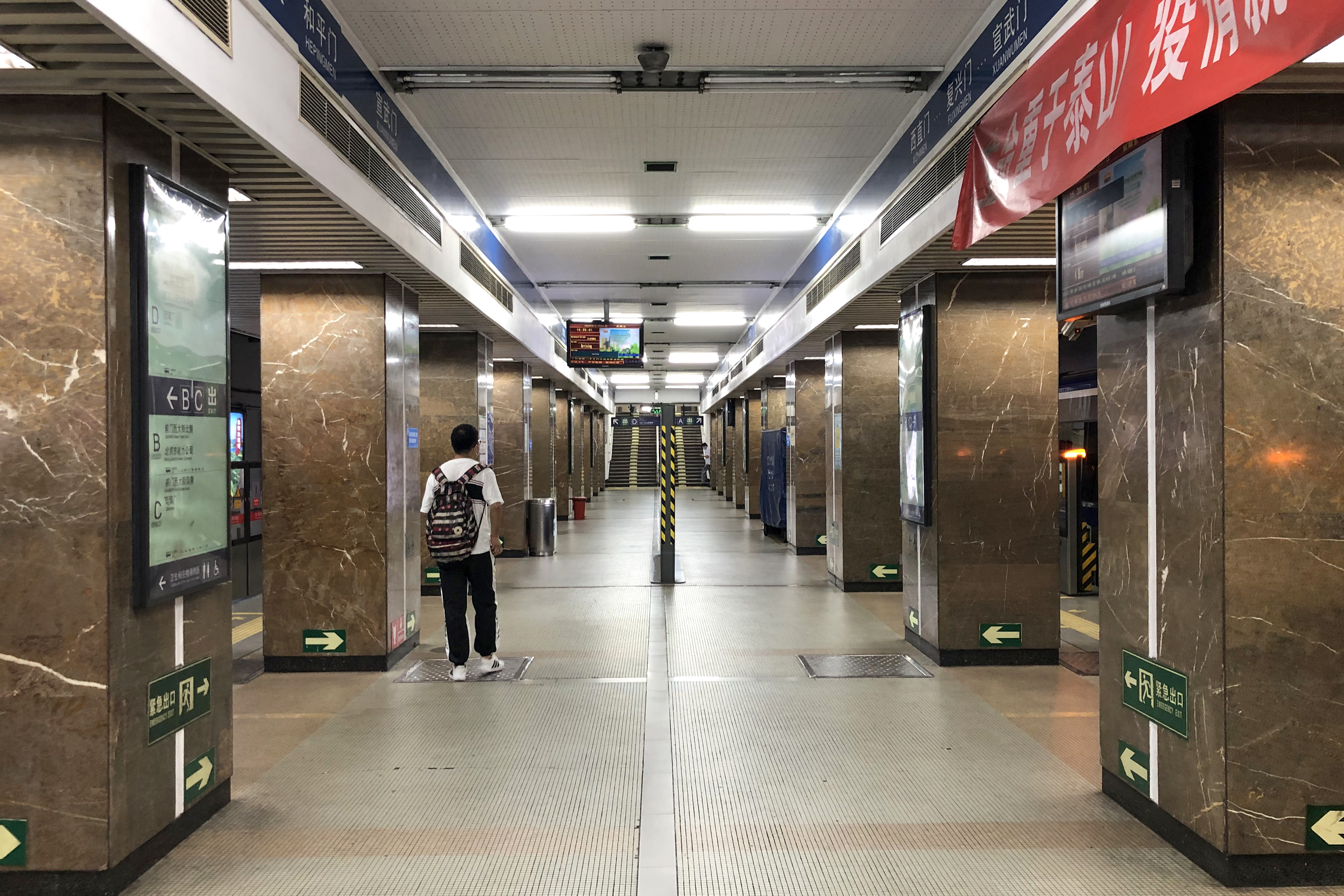
- Platform

General information
- Location: Hepingmen (North Xinhua Street / South Xinhua Street and Xuanwumen East Street / Qianmen West Street); Xicheng District, Beijing; China
- Coordinates: 39.900098°N 116.384209°E
- Operator: Beijing Mass Transit Railway Operation Corporation Limited
- Line: Line 2
- Platforms: 2 (1 island platform)
- Tracks: 2

Construction
- Structure type: Underground
- Accessible: Yes

Other information
- Station code: 207

History
- Opened: January 15, 1971; 55 years ago

Services
Preceding station	Beijing Subway	Following station
Qianmen outer loop / anticlockwise	Line 2	Xuanwu Men inner loop / clockwise
Location
- Location within Beijing

Heping Men Station (simplified Chinese: 和平门站; traditional Chinese: 和平門站; pinyin: Hépíng Mén Zhàn) is a station on Line 2 of the Beijing Subway.

== Station layout ==
The station has an underground island platform.

== Exits ==
There are 8 exits, lettered A1, A2, B1, B2, C1, C2, D1, and D2. Exit A1 is accessible.
