= Yongdingmenwai station =

Beijing Subway station

Yongdingmenwai 永定门外
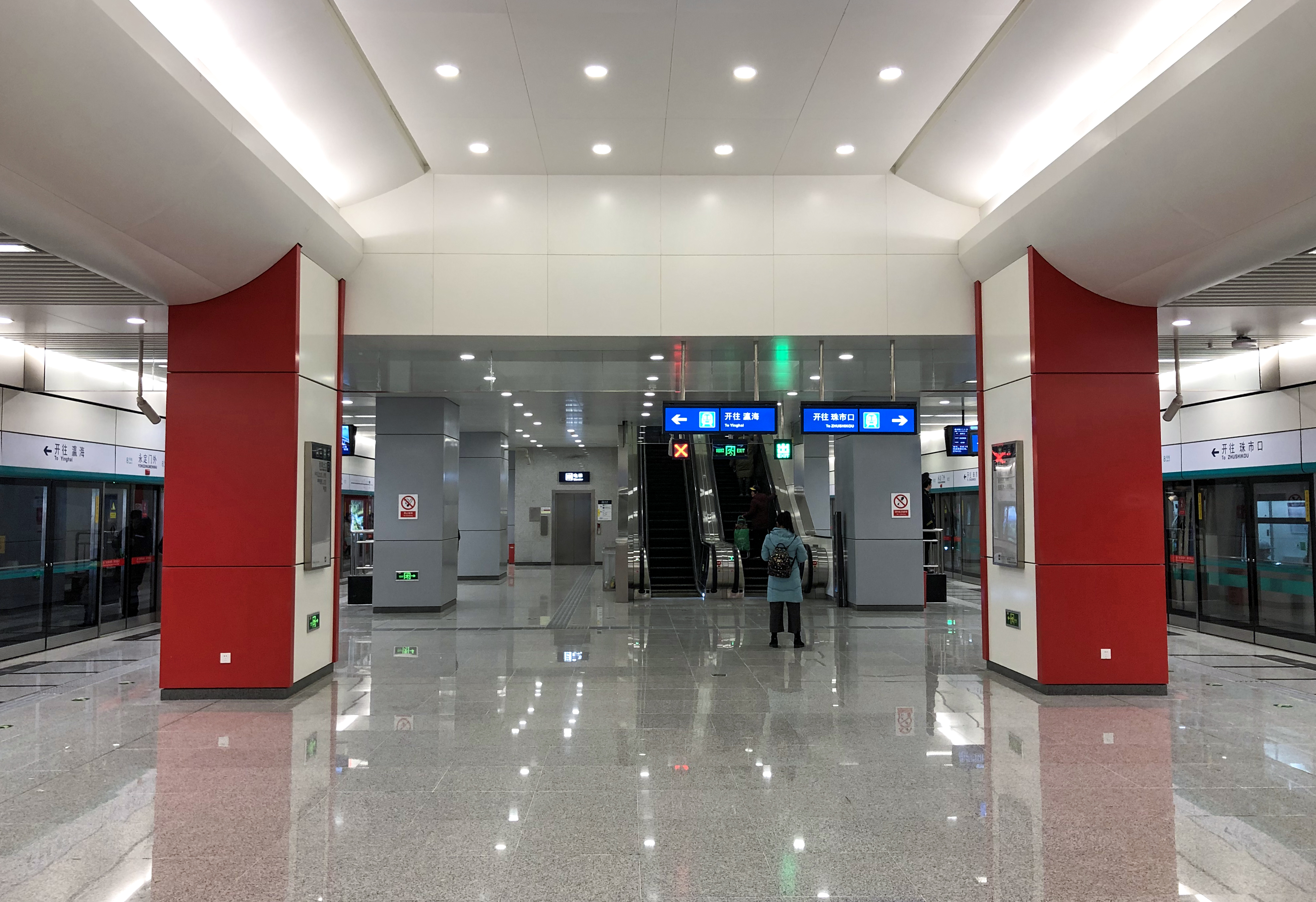
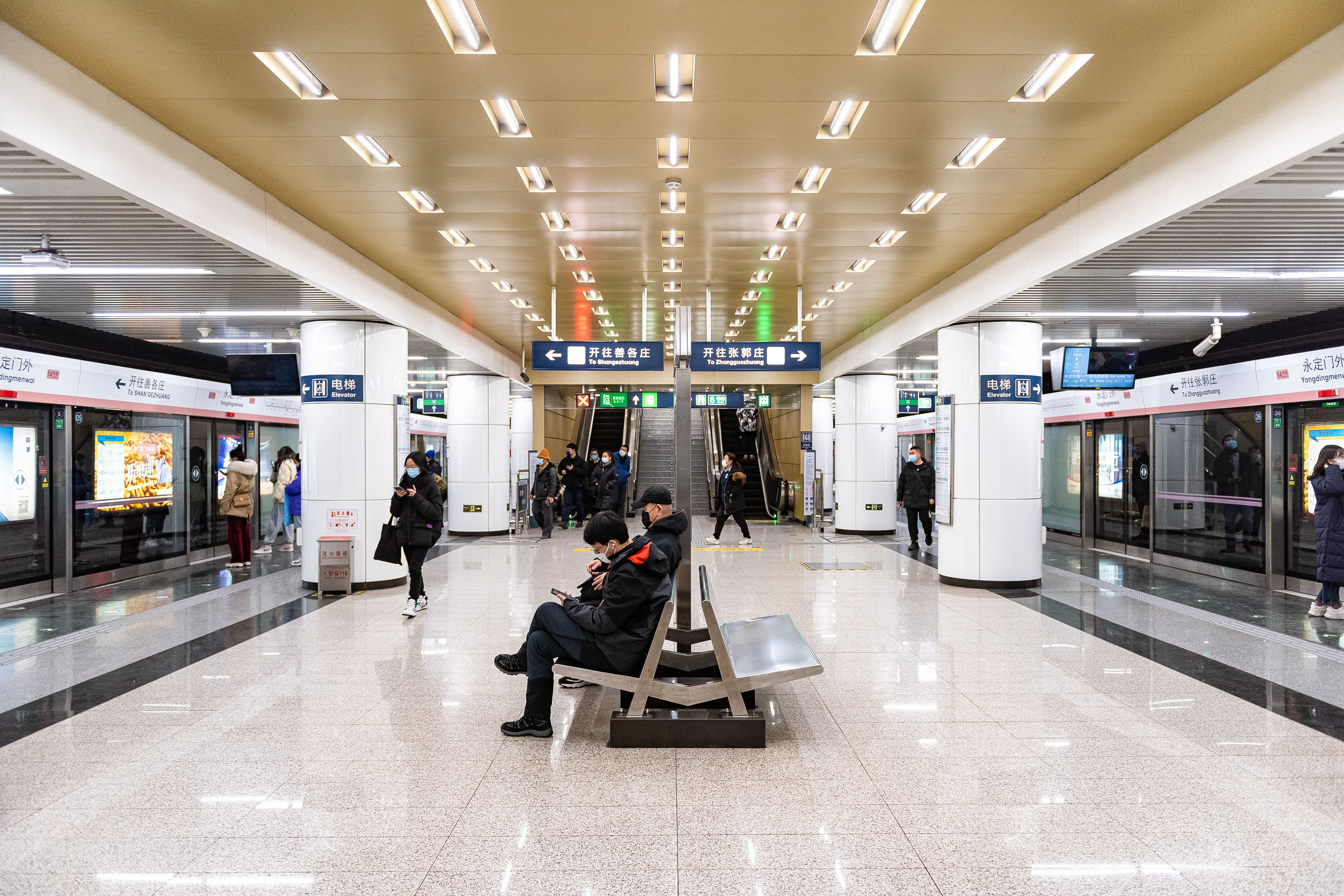
- Line 8 platform Line 14 platform

General information
- Location: Yongdingmen Outer Street; Dongcheng District, Beijing; China
- Coordinates: 39°52′03″N 116°23′58″E
- Operator: Beijing Mass Transit Railway Operation Corporation Limited (Line 8); Beijing MTR Corporation Limited (Line 14)
- Lines: Line 8; Line 14
- Platforms: 4 (2 island platforms)
- Tracks: 4

Construction
- Structure type: Underground
- Accessible: Yes

History
- Opened: December 30, 2018; 7 years ago (Line 8); December 26, 2015; 10 years ago (Line 14)

Services
Preceding station	Beijing Subway	Following station
Tianqiao towards Zhuxinzhuang	Line 8	Muxi Yuan towards Yinghai
Beijing South railway station towards Zhangguozhuang	Line 14	Jingtai towards Shangezhuang
Location
- Location within Beijing

Yongdingmenwai station (simplified Chinese: 永定门外站; traditional Chinese: 永定門外站; pinyin: Yǒngdìngménwài zhàn) is an interchange station on Line 8 and Line 14 of the Beijing Subway.

The Line 14 station opened on December 26, 2015. The Line 8 station was opened on December 30, 2018.

== Station layout ==
Both the line 8 and 14 stations have underground island platforms.

== Exits ==
There are 4 exits, lettered A, C, E, and F. Exits C, E, and F are accessible.

== Gallery ==
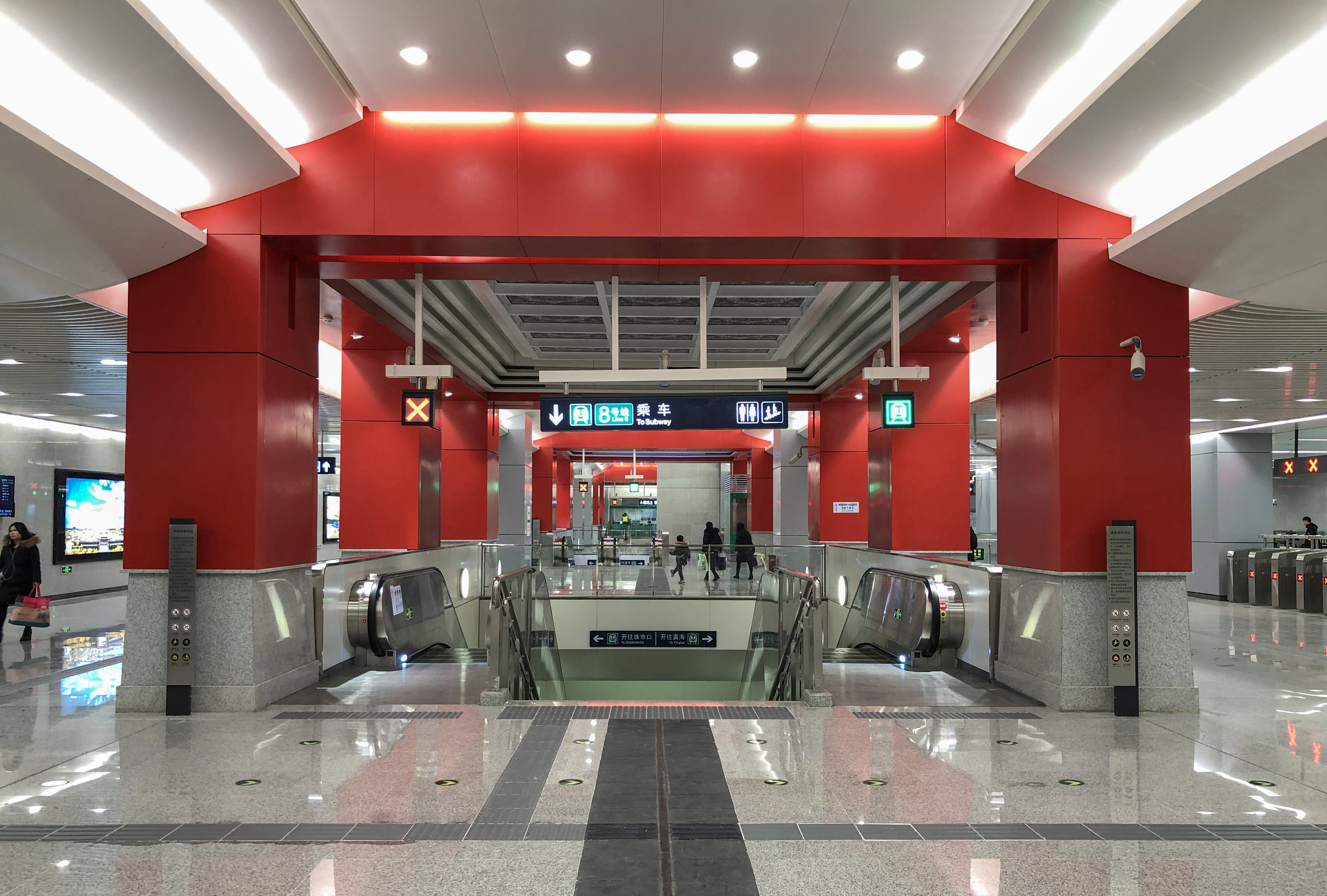
Line 8 concourse

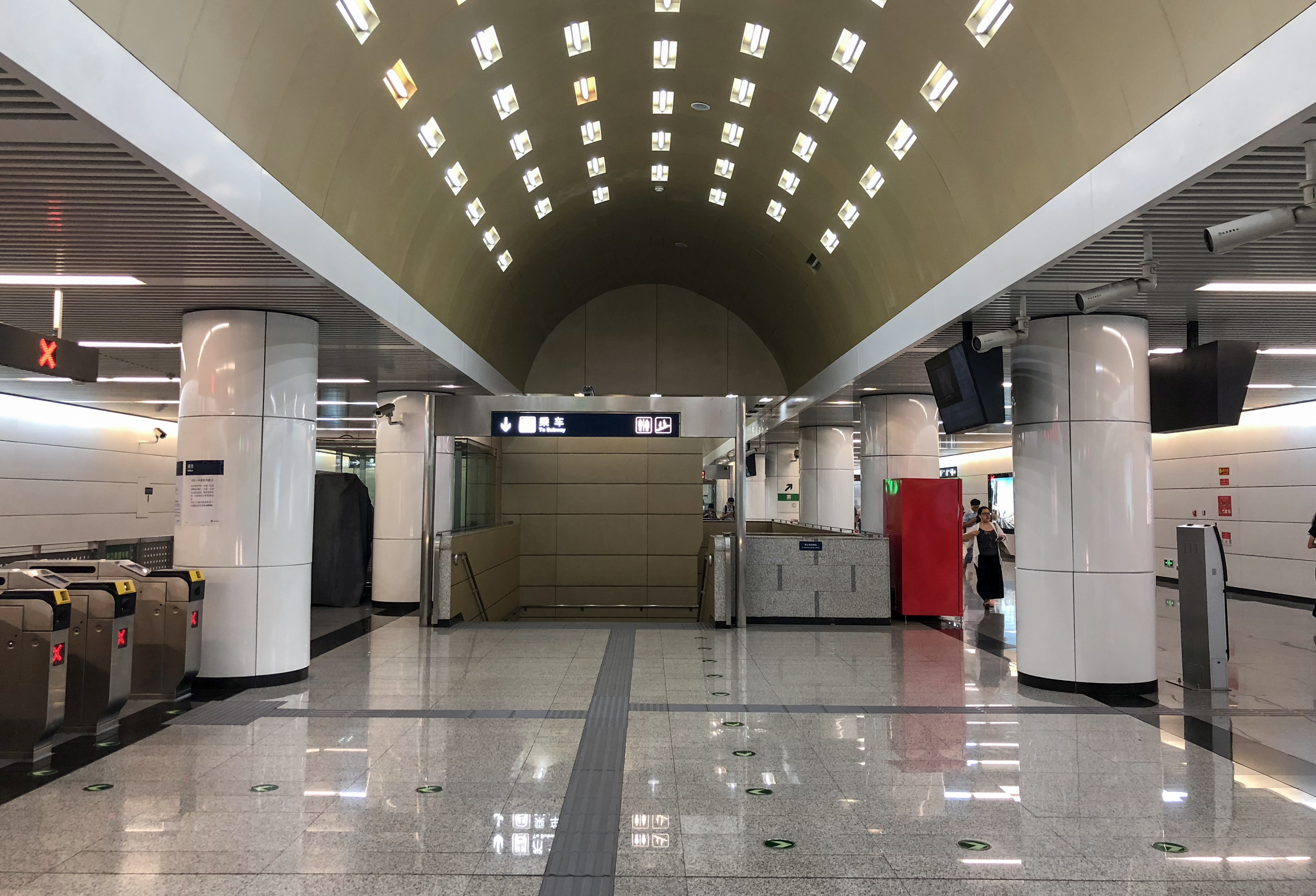
Line 14 concourse
