= Jingtai station (Beijing Subway) =

Beijing Subway station

Jingtai 景泰
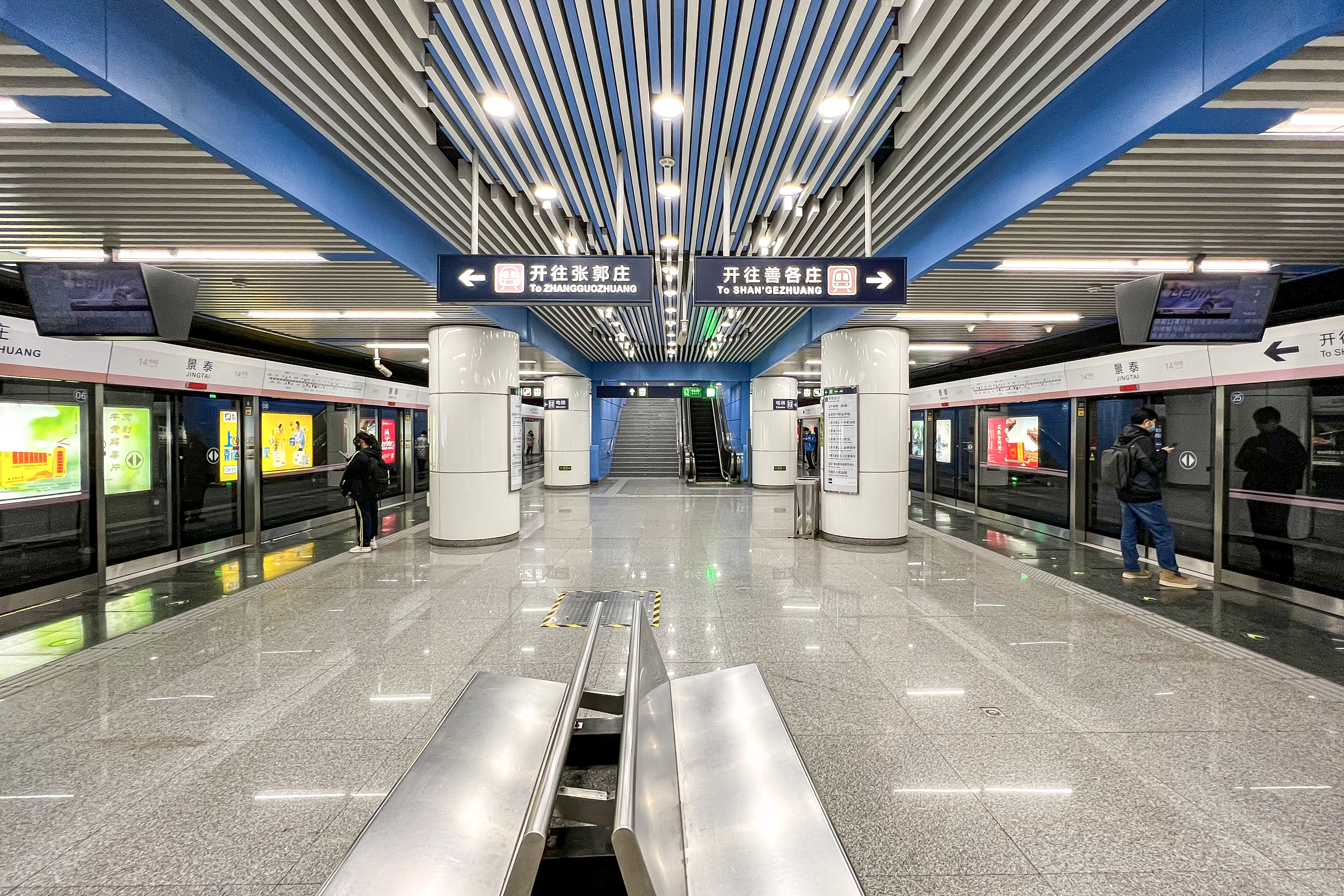
- Platform

General information
- Location: Anlelin Road (安乐林路); Dongcheng District, Beijing; China
- Coordinates: 39°51′55″N 116°24′40″E
- Operator: Beijing MTR Corporation Limited
- Line: Line 14
- Platforms: 2 (1 island platform)
- Tracks: 2

Construction
- Structure type: Underground
- Accessible: Yes

History
- Opened: December 26, 2015

Services
Preceding station	Beijing Subway	Following station
Yongdingmenwai towards Zhangguozhuang	Line 14	Puhuangyu towards Shangezhuang
Location
- Location within Beijing

Jingtai Station (Chinese: 景泰站; pinyin: Jǐngtài Zhàn) is a station on Line 14 of the Beijing Subway. It was opened on December 26, 2015.

== Station layout ==
The station has an underground island platform.

== Exits ==
There are 2 exits, lettered B and D. Exit B is accessible.
