= Tianqiao station =

Beijing Subway station

Tianqiao 天桥
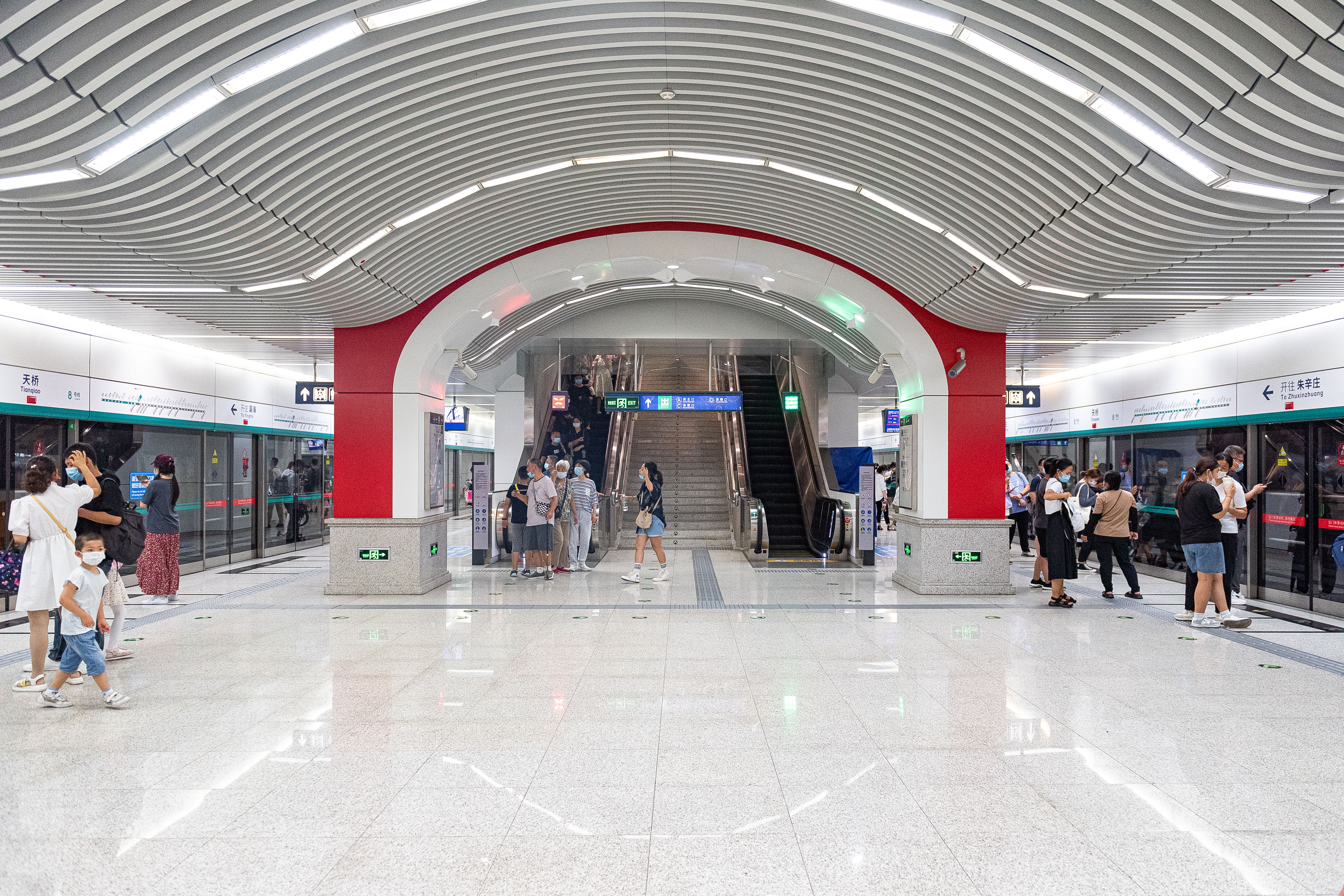
- Platform

General information
- Location: Tianqiao South Street; Dongcheng District / Xicheng District border, Beijing; China
- Coordinates: 39.880809°N 116.392480°E
- Operator: Beijing Mass Transit Railway Operation Corporation Limited
- Line: Line 8
- Platforms: 2 (1 island platform)
- Tracks: 2

Construction
- Structure type: Underground
- Accessible: Yes

History
- Opened: December 30, 2018

Services
Preceding station	Beijing Subway	Following station
Zhushikou towards Zhuxinzhuang	Line 8	Yongdingmenwai towards Yinghai
Location
- Location within Beijing

Tianqiao station (simplified Chinese: 天桥站; traditional Chinese: 天橋站; pinyin: Tiānqiáo zhàn) is a station on Line 8 of the Beijing Subway. It was opened on December 30, 2018.

== Station layout ==
The station has an underground island platform.

== Exits ==
There are 4 exits: lettered A, B, C, and D.
