= Yongtaizhuang station =

Beijing Subway station

Yongtaizhuang 永泰庄
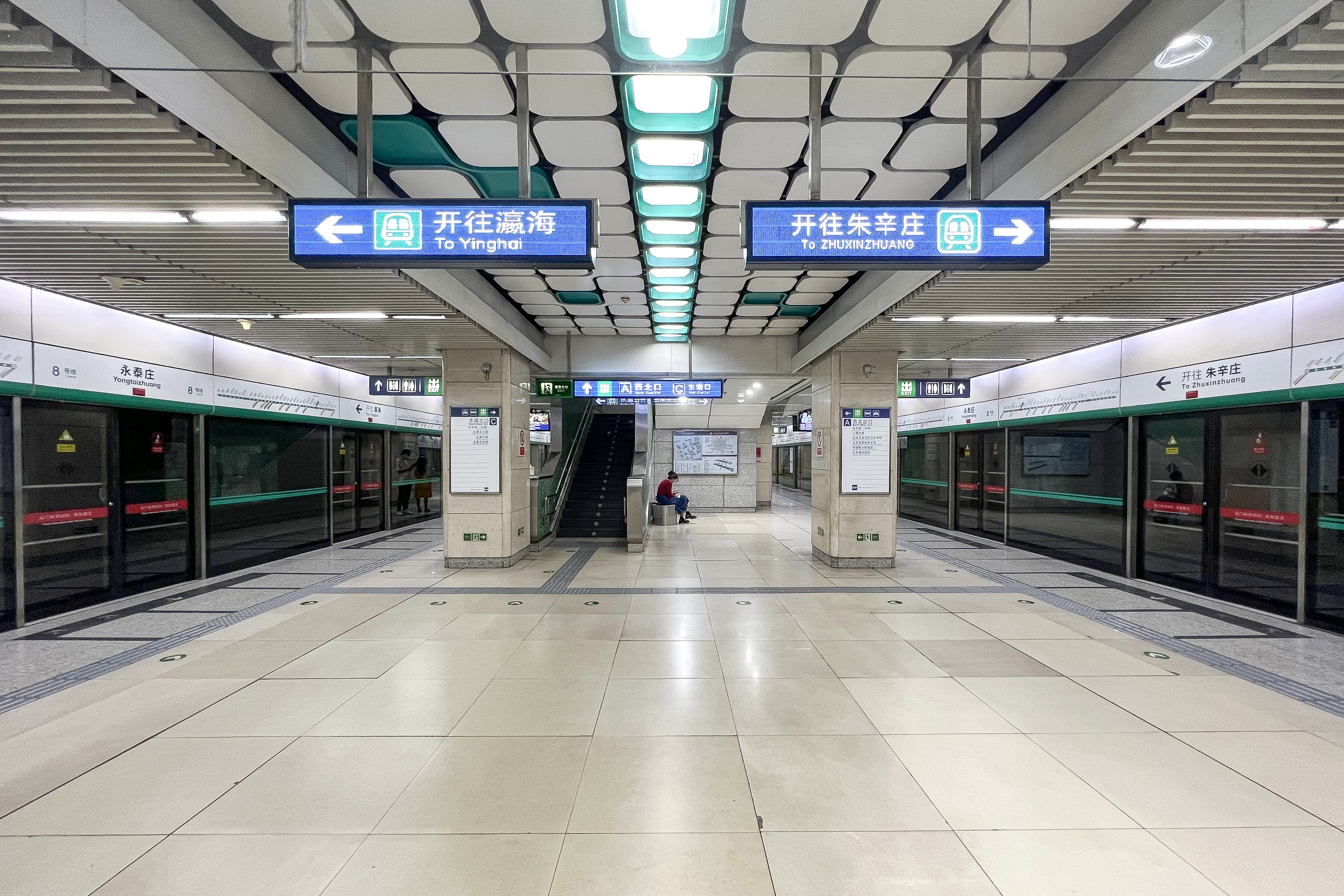
- Platform

General information
- Location: Houtun Road (后屯路), Yongtai Middle Road (永泰中路) and Yongtaizhuang North Road (永泰庄北路); Haidian District, Beijing; China
- Coordinates: 40.0377°N 116.3546°E
- Operator: Beijing Mass Transit Railway Operation Corporation Limited
- Line: Line 8
- Platforms: 2 (1 island platform)
- Tracks: 2

Construction
- Structure type: Underground
- Accessible: Yes

History
- Opened: December 31, 2011; 14 years ago

Services
| Preceding station | Beijing Subway | Following station |
|---|---|---|
| Xixiao Kou towards Zhuxinzhuang | Line 8 | Lincuiqiao towards Yinghai |
Location
- Location within Beijing

Yongtaizhuang station (simplified Chinese: 永泰庄站; traditional Chinese: 永泰莊站; pinyin: Yǒngtàizhuāng zhàn) is a station on Line 8 of the Beijing Subway.

== Station layout ==
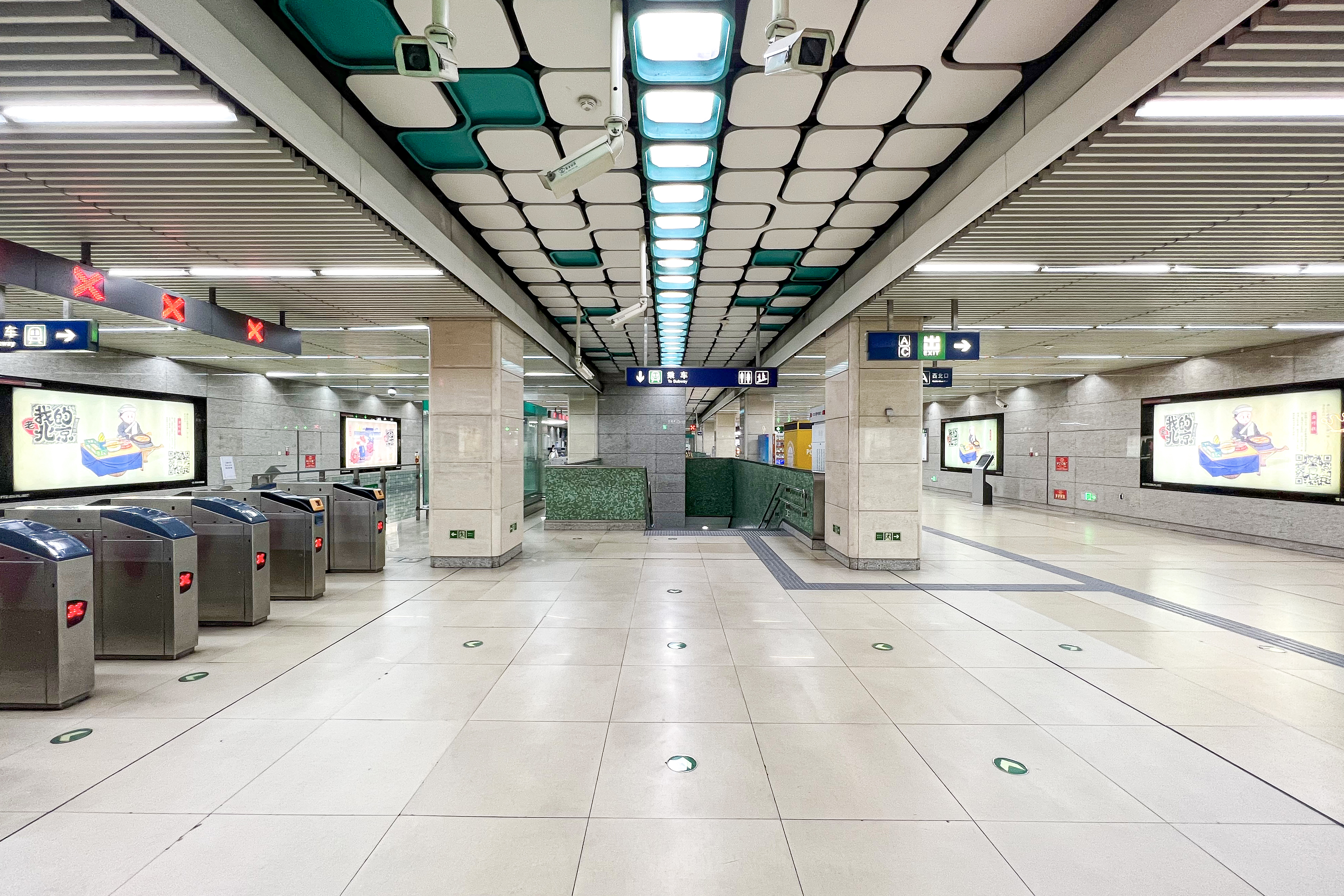
Concourse

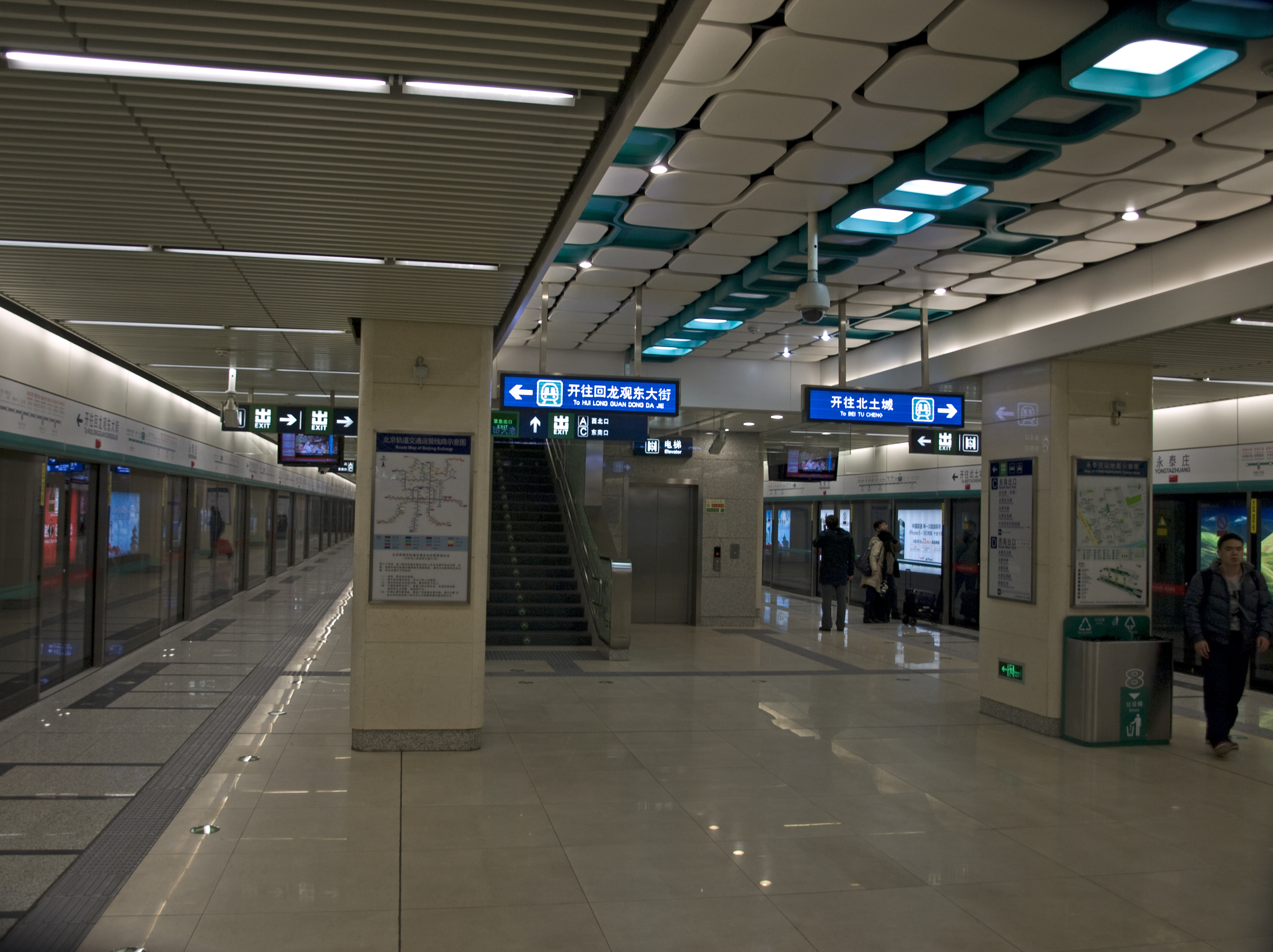
Platform in 2012

The station has an underground island platform.

== Exits ==
There are 2 exits, lettered A and C. Exit C is accessible.
