= Xixiao Kou station =

Beijing Subway station

Xixiao Kou 西小口
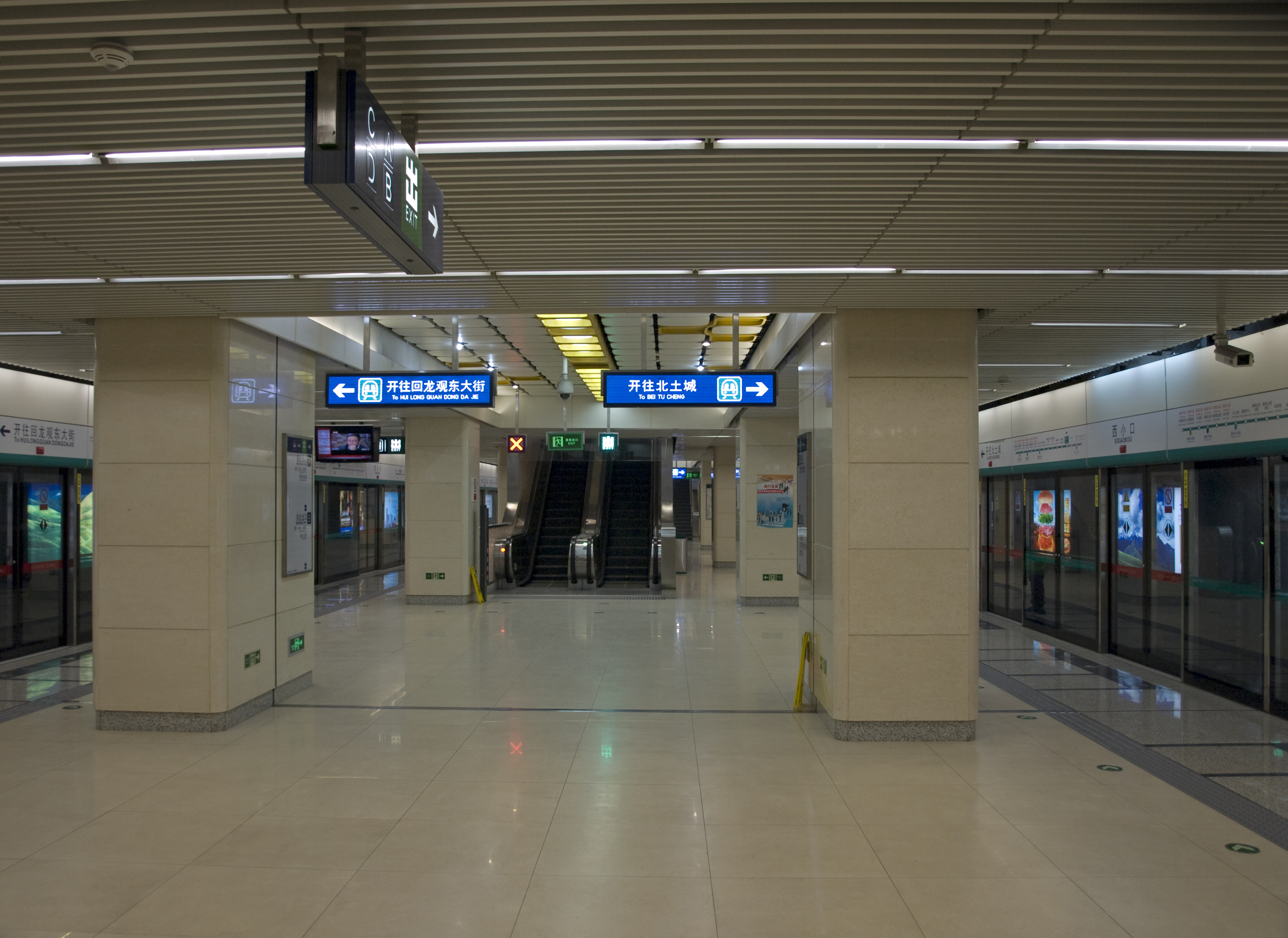
- Platform

General information
- Location: Houtun Road (后屯路) and Xixiaokou Road (西小口路); Haidian District, Beijing; China
- Coordinates: 40.0468°N 116.3517°E
- Operator: Beijing Mass Transit Railway Operation Corporation Limited
- Line: Line 8
- Platforms: 2 (1 island platform)
- Tracks: 2

Construction
- Structure type: Underground
- Accessible: Yes

History
- Opened: December 31, 2011; 14 years ago

Services
Preceding station	Beijing Subway	Following station
Yuxin towards Zhuxinzhuang	Line 8	Yongtaizhuang towards Yinghai
Location
- Location within Beijing

Xixiao Kou station (Chinese: 西小口站; pinyin: Xīxiǎo Kǒu zhàn) is a station on Line 8 of the Beijing Subway.

== Station layout ==
The station has an underground island platform.

== Exits ==
There are 4 exits, lettered A, B, C, and D. Exit A is accessible.
