= Yuxin station =

Beijing Subway station

Yuxin 育新
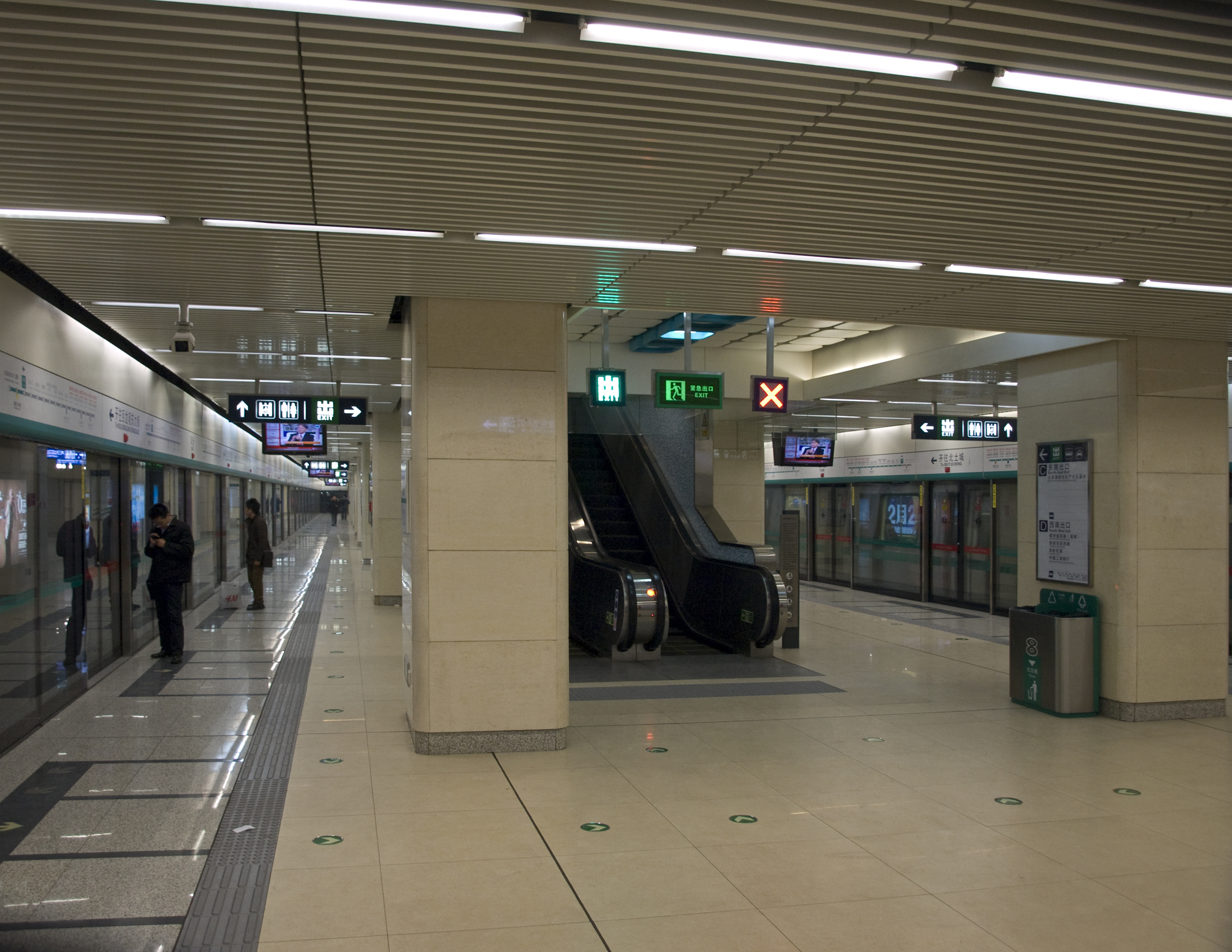
- Platform

General information
- Location: Huangping Road (黄平路) and West Jiancaicheng Road (建材城西路); Haidian District / Changping District border, Beijing; China
- Coordinates: 40°03′36″N 116°20′50″E
- Operator: Beijing Mass Transit Railway Operation Corporation Limited
- Line: Line 8
- Platforms: 2 (1 island platform)
- Tracks: 2

Construction
- Structure type: Underground
- Accessible: Yes

History
- Opened: December 31, 2011; 14 years ago

Services
| Preceding station | Beijing Subway | Following station |
|---|---|---|
| Huoying towards Zhuxinzhuang | Line 8 | Xixiao Kou towards Yinghai |
Location
- Location within Beijing

Yuxin station (Chinese: 育新站; pinyin: Yùxīn zhàn) is a station on Line 8 of the Beijing Subway.

== Station layout ==
The station has an underground island platform.

== Exits ==
There are 4 exits, lettered A, B, C, and D. Exit C is accessible.
