= Lincuiqiao station =

Beijing Subway station

Coordinates: 40.0219°N 116.3730°E

Lincuiqiao 林萃桥
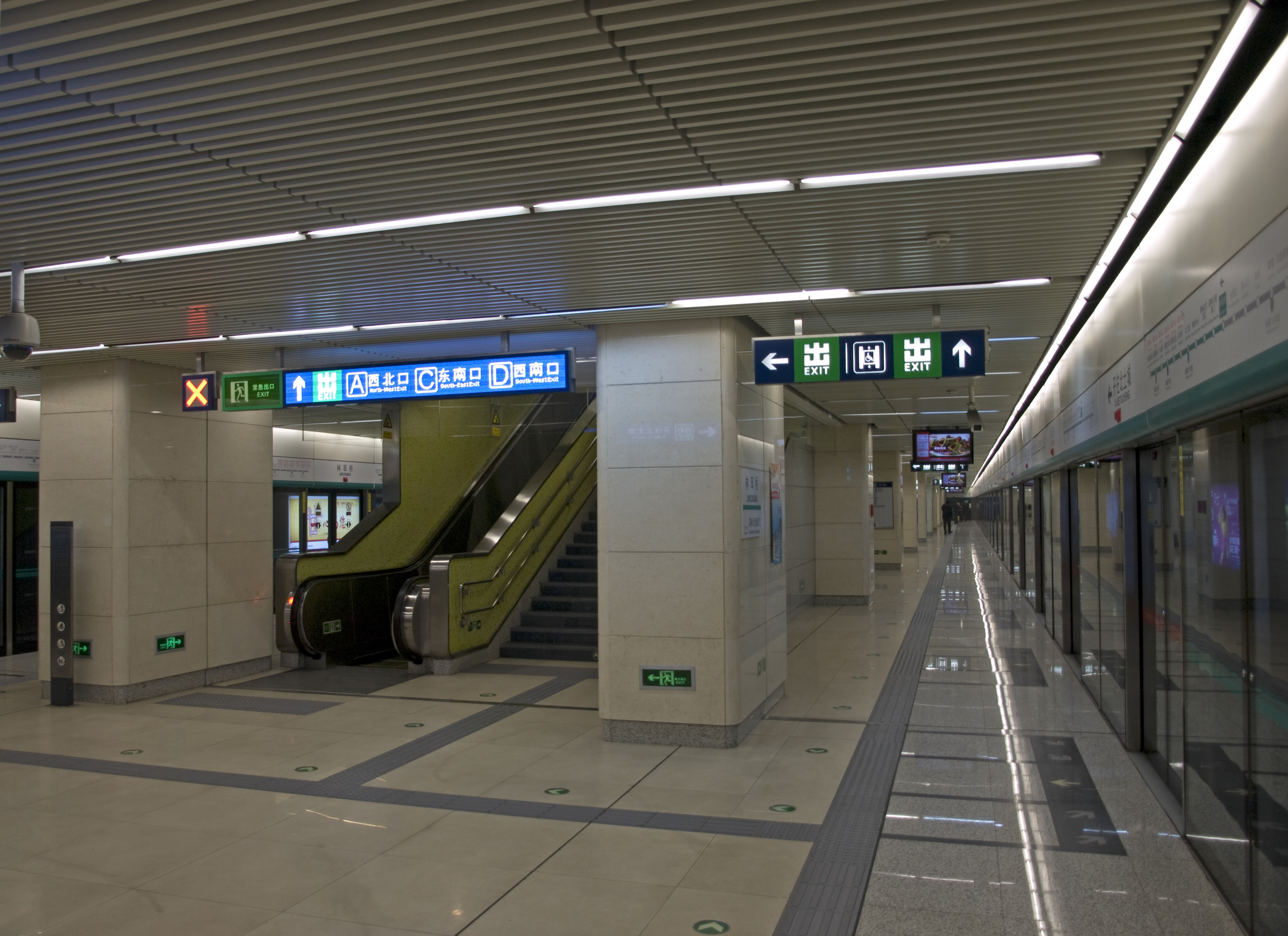
- Platform in 2012

General information
- Location: Lincui Bridge (林萃桥); North 5th Ring Road Middle and Lincui Road (林萃路); Chaoyang District, Beijing; China
- Operator: Beijing Mass Transit Railway Operation Corporation Limited
- Line: Line 8
- Platforms: 2 (1 island platform)
- Tracks: 2

Construction
- Structure type: Underground
- Accessible: Yes

History
- Opened: 31 December 2011

Services
| Preceding station | Beijing Subway | Following station |
|---|---|---|
| Yongtaizhuang towards Zhuxinzhuang | Line 8 | Forest Park South Gate towards Yinghai |
Location
- Location within Beijing

Lincuiqiao station (simplified Chinese: 林萃桥站; traditional Chinese: 林萃橋站; pinyin: Líncuìqiáo zhàn) is a station on Line 8 of the Beijing Subway. It is located in Beijing's Chaoyang District along the north-south Lincui Road (林萃路) just inside the North 5th Ring Road (middle section). It is located near the National Tennis Center and the National Speed Skating Oval.

== History ==
Phase 2 of Line 8 did not originally contain plans for construction of this station, but as the track distance between the neighboring stations Yongtaizhuang and Forest Park South Gate is about 5.1 km (3.2 mi), Lincuiqiao station was added to the line plans.

The station opened on 31 December 2011.

== Station layout ==
The station has an underground island platform.

== Exits ==
There are 4 exits, lettered A, C1, C2, and D. Exit C1 is accessible.
