= Gaoloujin station =

Beijing Subway station

Gaoloujin 高楼金
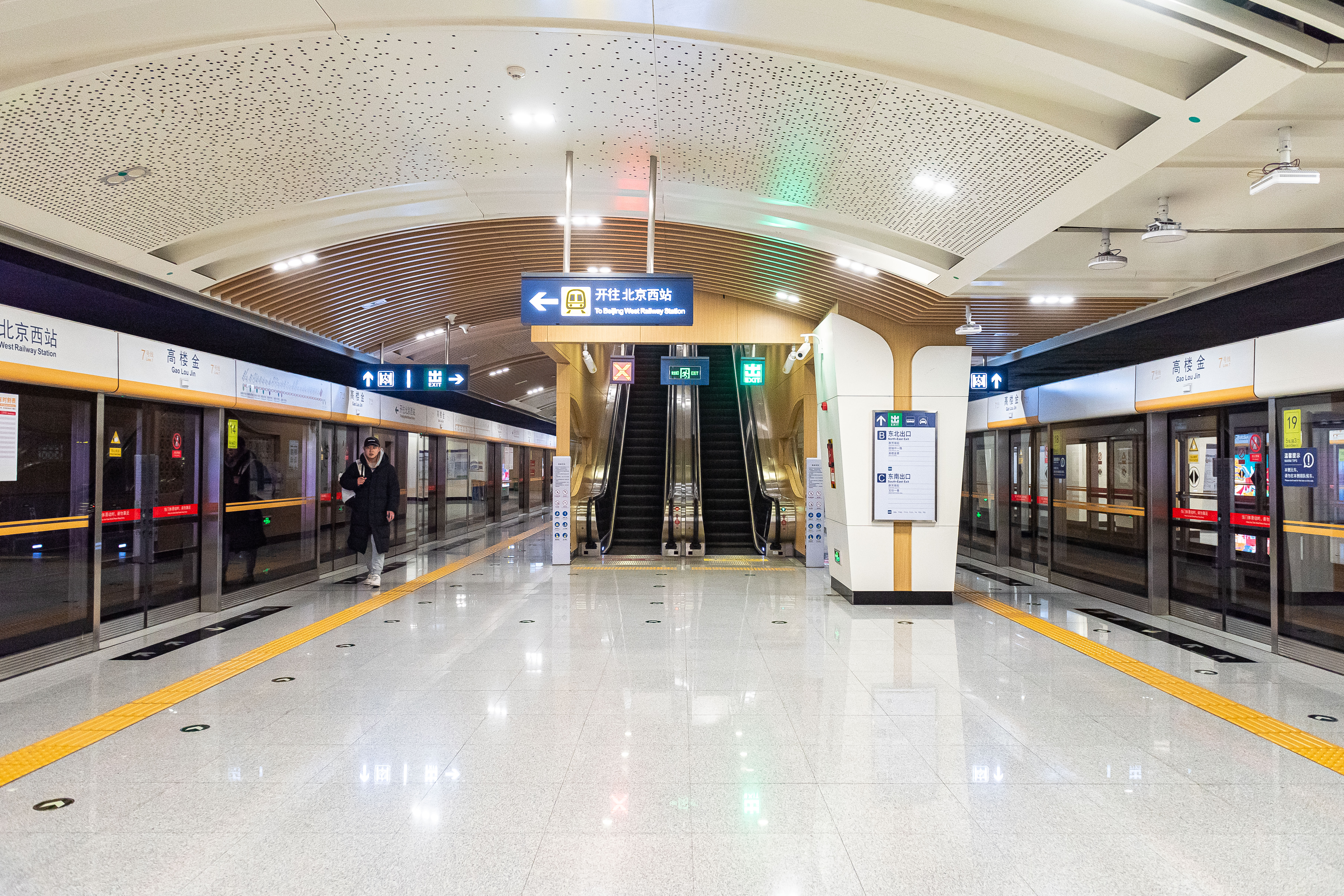
- Westbound platform

General information
- Location: Gaoloujin Village, Liyuan Town, Tongzhou District, Beijing; China
- Operator: Beijing Mass Transit Railway Operation Corporation Limited
- Line: Line 7
- Platforms: 4 (2 island platforms)
- Tracks: 3

Construction
- Structure type: Underground
- Accessible: Yes

History
- Opened: December 28, 2019; 6 years ago

Services
Preceding station	Beijing Subway	Following station
Qunfang towards Beijing West railway station	Line 7	Huazhuang towards Universal Resort
Location
- Location within Beijing

Gaoloujin station (simplified Chinese: 高楼金站; traditional Chinese: 高樓金站; pinyin: Gāolóujīn zhàn) is a subway station on Line 7 of the Beijing Subway, located in Gaoloujin Village, Liyuan Town in Tongzhou District. It has a double island platform. Most trains head for Universal Resort, but some trains terminate here.

== Station layout ==
The station has underground dual-island platforms with a track in the center.

== Exits ==
There are 4 exits, lettered A, B, C, and D. All exits are accessible.
