= Wanshengxi station =

Beijing Subway station

Wanshengxi 万盛西
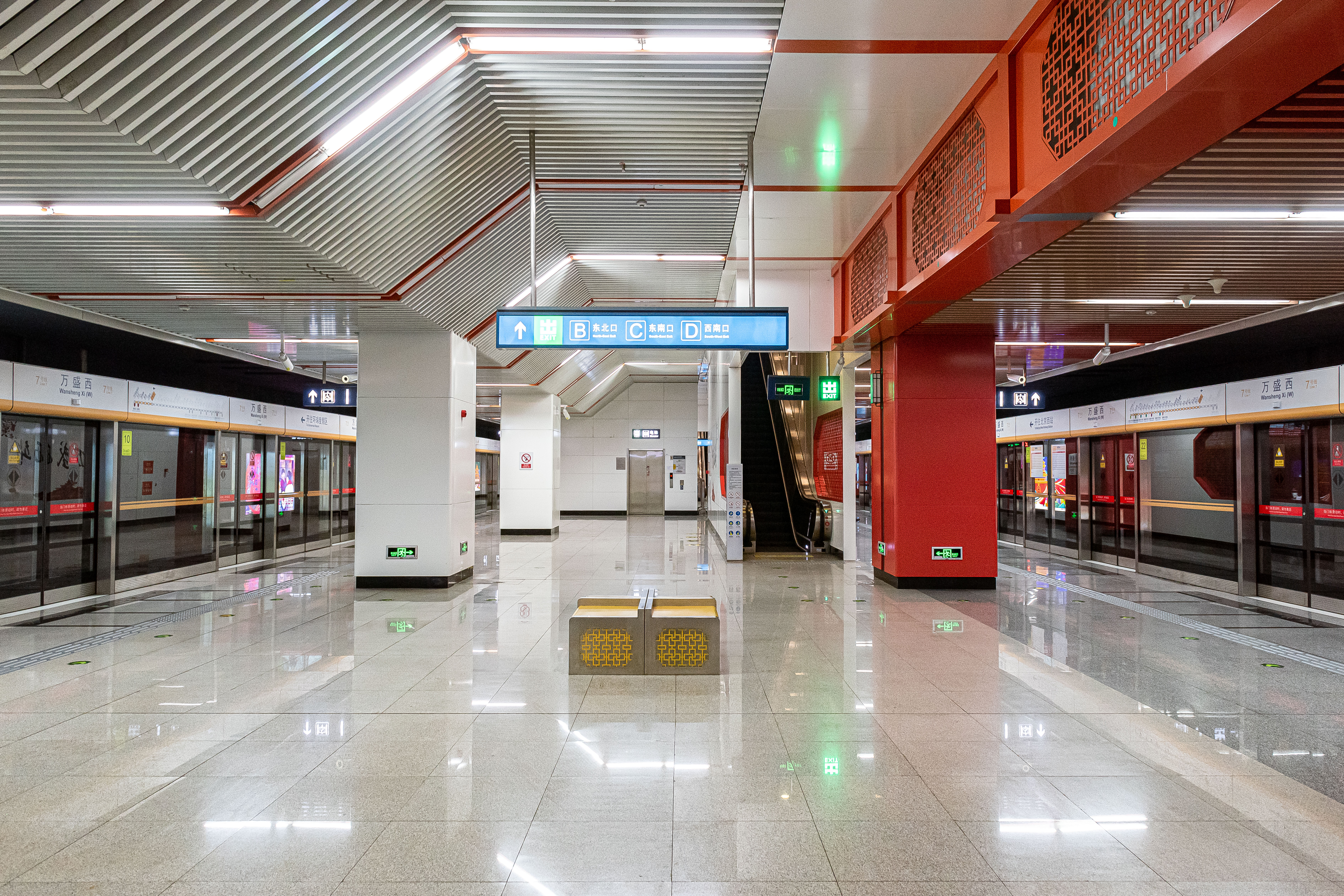
- Platform

General information
- Location: Dagao Village, Liyuan Town, Tongzhou District, Beijing; China
- Coordinates: 39.862344°N 116.626618°E
- Operator: Beijing Mass Transit Railway Operation Corporation Limited
- Line: Line 7
- Platforms: 2 (1 island platform)

Construction
- Structure type: Underground
- Accessible: Yes

History
- Opened: December 28, 2019; 6 years ago

Services
Preceding station	Beijing Subway	Following station
Heizhuanghu towards Beijing West railway station	Line 7	Wanshengdong towards Universal Resort
Location
- Location within Beijing

Wanshengxi station (Chinese: 万盛西站) is a subway station on the Line 7 of the Beijing Subway.

== History ==
The station was formerly called Wanshengnanjiexikou station. In May 2019, the Beijing Municipal Commission of Planning and Natural Resources proposed a naming plan for the stations of the eastern extension of Line 7, and they planned to name it Dagao station. On November 20, 2019, the station was officially named Wansheng Xi (West) station. The station opened on December 28, 2019.

== Station layout ==
The station has an underground island platform.

== Exits ==
There are 3 exits, lettered B, C2, and D. Exits B and D are accessible.
