= Qunfang station =

Beijing Subway station

Qunfang 群芳
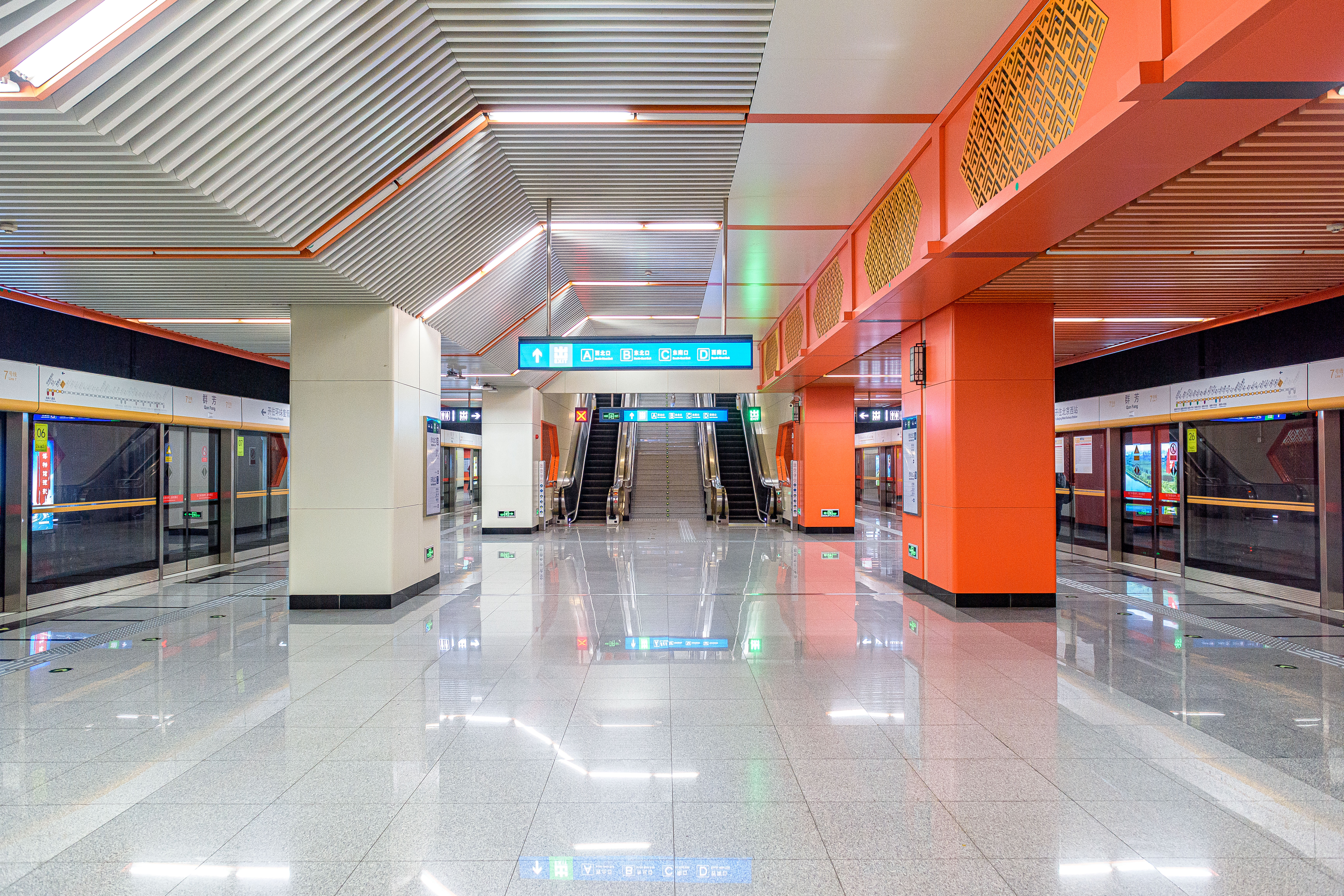
- Platform

General information
- Location: Dongxiaomazhuang Village, Liyuan Town, Tongzhou District, Beijing; China
- Coordinates: 39.862260°N 116.664728°E
- Operator: Beijing Mass Transit Railway Operation Corporation Limited
- Line: Line 7
- Platforms: 2 (1 island platform)
- Tracks: 2

Construction
- Structure type: Underground
- Accessible: Yes

History
- Opened: December 28, 2019; 6 years ago

Services
Preceding station	Beijing Subway	Following station
Wanshengdong towards Beijing West railway station	Line 7	Gaoloujin towards Universal Resort
Location
- Location within Beijing

Qunfang station (Chinese: 群芳站) is a subway station on the Line 7 of the Beijing Subway.

== History ==
The station was formerly called Xiaomazhuang station. In May 2019, the Beijing Municipal Commission of Planning and Natural Resources proposed a naming plan for the stations of the eastern extension of Line 7, and they planned to name it Qun Fang station. On November 20, 2019, the station was officially named Qun Fang station. The station opened on December 28, 2019.

== Station layout ==
The station has an underground island platform.

== Exits ==
There are 4 exits, lettered A, B, C, and D. Exits A and C are accessible.
