= Wanshengdong station =

Beijing Subway station

Wanshengdong 万盛东
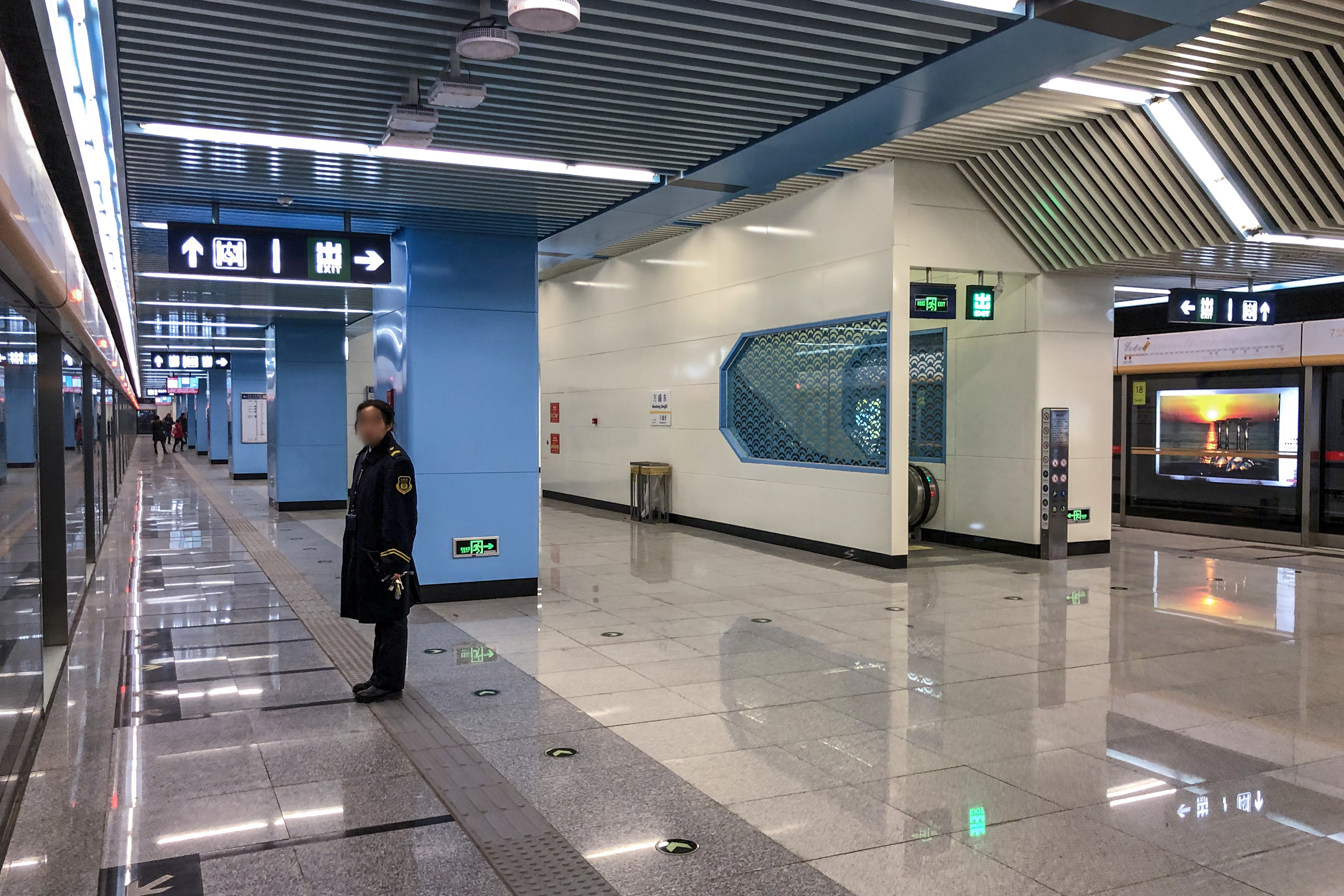
- Platform

General information
- Location: Damazhuang Village, Liyuan Town, Tongzhou District, Beijing; China
- Coordinates: 39.862276°N 116.650774°E
- Operator: Beijing Mass Transit Railway Operation Corporation Limited
- Line: Line 7
- Platforms: 2 (1 island platform)
- Tracks: 2

Construction
- Structure type: Underground
- Accessible: Yes

History
- Opened: December 28, 2019; 6 years ago

Services
Preceding station	Beijing Subway	Following station
Wanshengxi towards Beijing West railway station	Line 7	Qunfang towards Universal Resort
Location
- Location within Beijing

Wanshengdong station (Chinese: 万盛东站) is a subway station on the Line 7 of the Beijing Subway.

== History ==
The station was formerly called Yunjingdonglu station. In May 2019, the Beijing Municipal Commission of Planning and Natural Resources proposed a naming plan for the stations of the eastern extension of Line 7, and they planned to name it Wansheng station. On November 20, 2019, the station was officially named Wansheng Dong (East) station. The station opened on December 28, 2019.

== Station layout ==
The station has an underground island platform.

== Exits ==
There are 3 exits, lettered A, C, and D. Exits A and C are accessible.
