= Z63/64 Beijing–Changchun through train =

Railway service in China

The Z63/64 Beijing–Changchun through train (Chinese: Z63/64次北京到长春直达特快列车) is a Chinese railway running between the capital Beijing to Changchun, capital of Jilin express passenger trains by the Shenyang Railway Bureau, Changchun passenger segment responsible for passenger transport task, Changchun originating on the Beijing train. 25T Type Passenger trains running along the Jingha Railway across Jilin, Liaoning, Hebei, Tianjin, Beijing and other provinces and cities, the entire 1002 km. Beijing railway station to Changchun railway station running 9 hours and 26 minutes, use trips for Z63; Changchun railway station to Beijing railway station to run 9 hours and 21 minutes, use trips for Z64.

== Carriages ==
Carriage number	1－7	8	9－18	19
Type of carriages	RW25T; Soft sleeper (Chinese: 软卧车)	RW19T; Luxury Soft Sleeper (Chinese: 高级包厢软卧车)	YW25T; Hard sleeper (Chinese: 硬卧车)	XL25T; Baggage car (Chinese: 行李车)

== Locomotives ==
Sections	Beijing－Changchun
Locomotives and their allocation	DF11G diesel locomotive Beijing Railway Bureau Beijing Depot (Chinese: 京局京段)

=== Timetable ===
Z63		Stops	Z64	
Arrive	Depart	Stops	Arrive	Depart
—	20:50	Beijing	08:12	—
04:47	04:50	Siping	23:35	23:38
06:04	—	Changchun	—	22:33

== See also ==
- Z61/62 Beijing-Changchun Through Train
- D19/20 Beijing-Changchun Through Train
- D23/24 Beijing-Changchun Through Train
- G399/400 Beijing-Changchun Through Train
