= D23/24 Beijing–Changchun through train =

Railway service in China

The D23/24 Beijing–Changchun through train (Chinese: D23/24次北京到长春动车组列车) is a Chinese railway running between the capital Beijing to Changchun, capital of Jilin express passenger trains by the Shenyang Railway Bureau, Changchun passenger segment responsible for passenger transport task, Changchun originating on the Beijing train. CRH5 Type Passenger trains running along the Jingha Railway and Harbin–Dalian High-Speed Railway across Jilin, Liaoning, Hebei, Tianjin, Beijing and other provinces and cities, the entire 1013 km. Beijing railway station to Changchun railway station running 6 hours and 47 minutes, use trips for D23; Changchun railway station to Beijing railway station to run 6 hours and 51 minutes, use trips for D24.

== See also ==
- Z61/62 Beijing-Changchun Through Train
- Z63/64 Beijing-Changchun Through Train
- D19/20 Beijing-Changchun Through Train
- G399/400 Beijing-Changchun Through Train
