= Z61/62 Beijing–Changchun through train =

Railway service in China

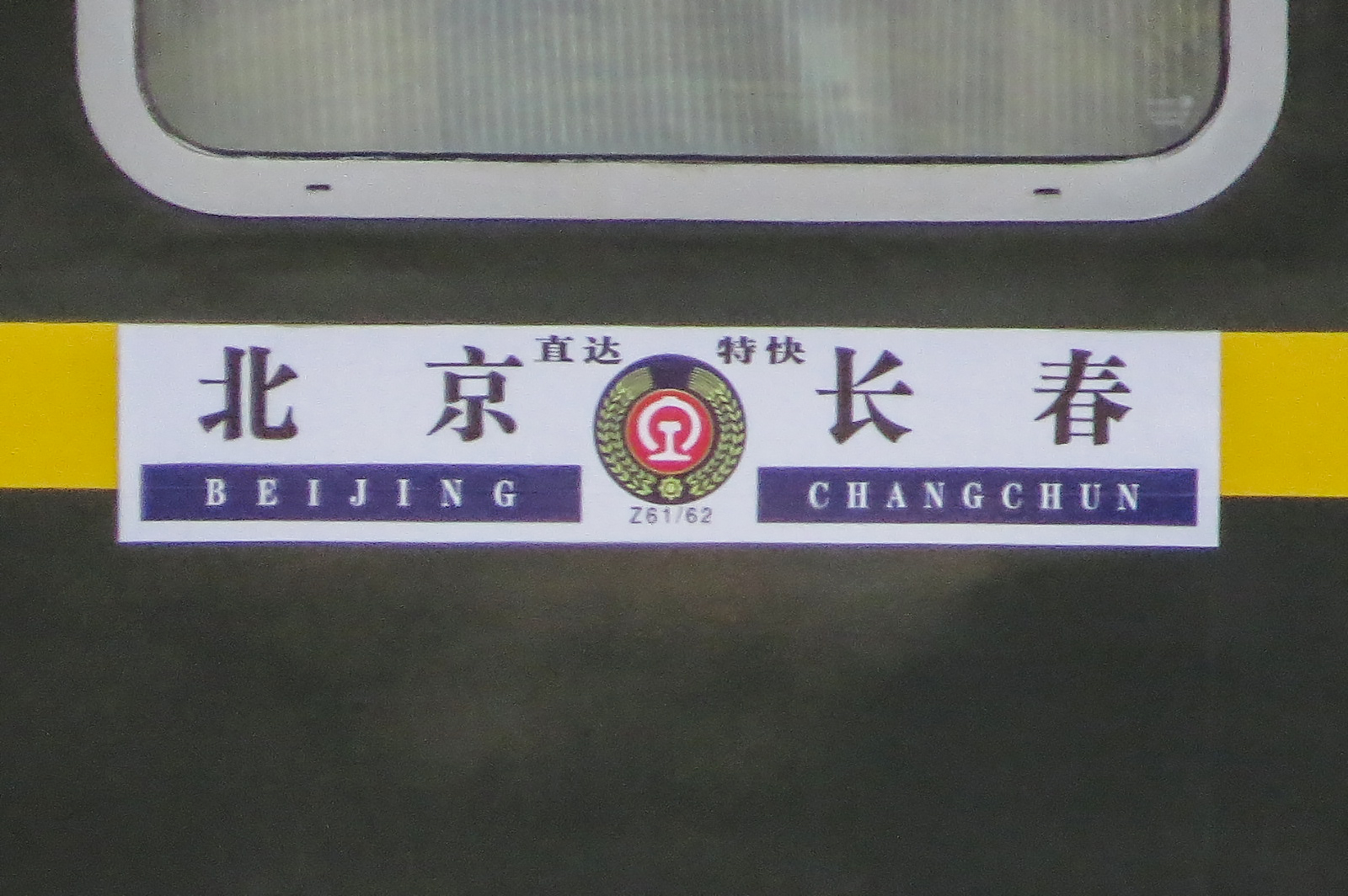
Z61/62 train in April 2017

The Z61/62 Beijing–Changchun through train (Chinese: Z61/62次北京到长春直达特快列车) is a Chinese passenger train running between the capital Beijing and Changchun, the capital of Jilin, operated by the Shenyang Railway Bureau. Changchun passenger segment is responsible for passenger transportation, Changchun originating on the Beijing train. 25T type passenger trains are used along the Jingha Railway across Jilin, Liaoning, Hebei, Tianjin, Beijing and other provinces and cities, for the entire 1,002 km (623 mi). Travel time from Beijing railway station to Changchun railway station is 8 hours and 28 minutes on train number Z61, while travel time from Changchun to Beijing is 8 hours and 11 minutes on its counterpart, train number Z62.

== Carriages ==
Carriage number	1－8	9	10－18
Type of carriages	RW25T; Soft sleeper (Chinese: 软卧车)	RW19T; Luxury Soft Sleeper (Chinese: 高级包厢软卧车)	YW25T; Hard sleeper (Chinese: 硬卧车)

== Locomotives ==
Sections	Beijing－Changchun
Locomotives and their allocation	DF11G diesel locomotive Shenyang Railway Bureau Shenyang Depot (Chinese: 沈局沈段)

=== Timetable ===
Z61		Stops	Z62	
Arrive	Depart	Stops	Arrive	Depart
—	22:10	Beijing	06:08	—
06:38	—	Changchun	—	22:00

== See also ==
- Z63/64 Beijing-Changchun Through Train
- Z721/Z722 Beijing-Changchun Through Train
- D19/20 Beijing-Changchun Through Train
- D23/24 Beijing-Changchun Through Train
- G399/400 Beijing-Changchun Through Train
