= Beijing underground cross-city railway =

Underground railway line in Beijing, China

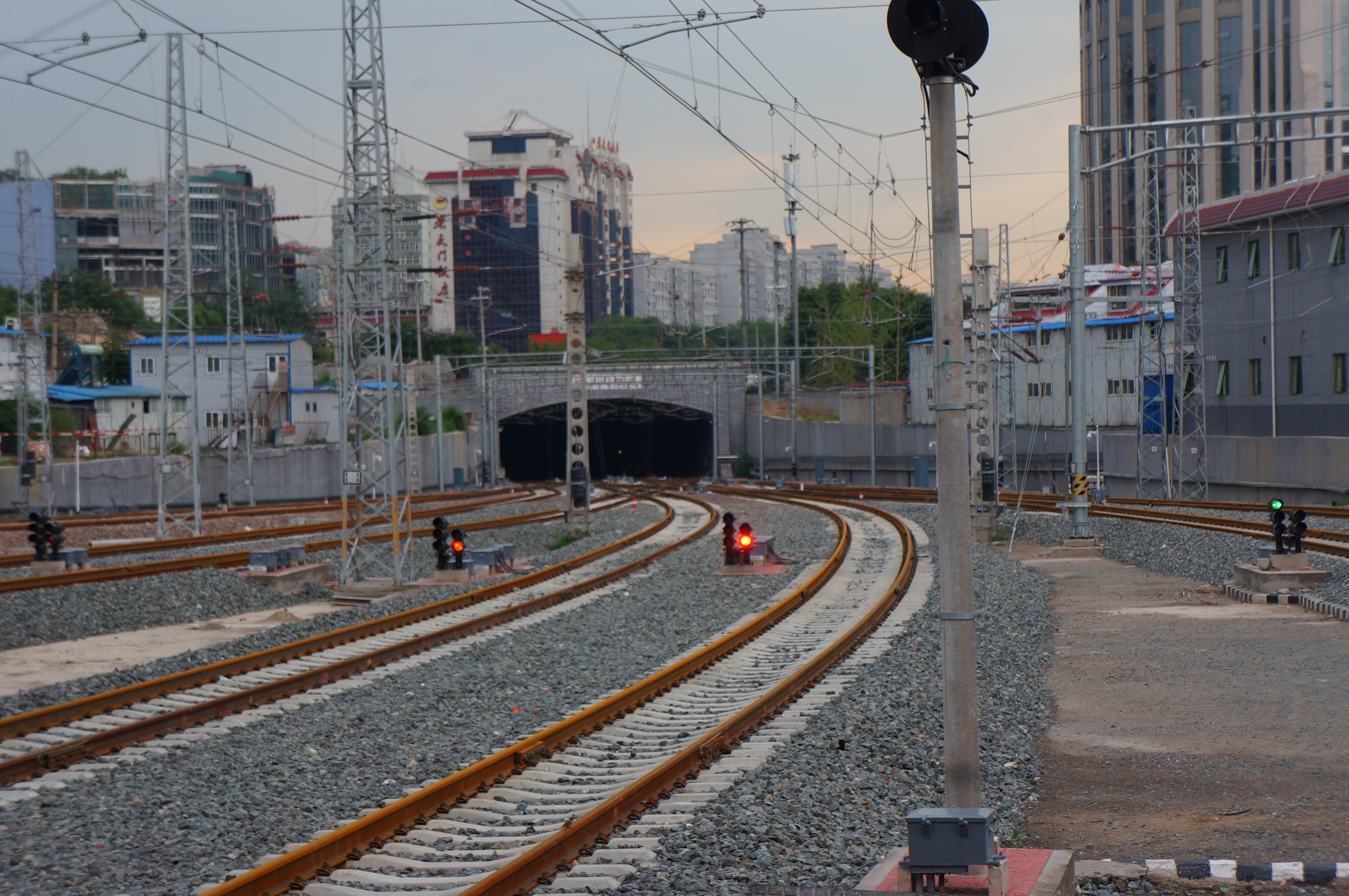
- The entrance of Qiansanmen Tunnel from Beijing railway station

Overview
- Status: Operational
- Locale: Beijing
- Termini: Beijing; Beijing West
- Stations: 2

Service
- Type: Heavy rail
- Operator(s): China Railway Beijing Group
- Rolling stock: HXD3D, SS9, CRH6 (Note: CRH6 only used by the Sub-Central line of Beijing Suburban Railway, the commuter rail service in Beijing.)

History
- Opened: March 20, 2015

Technical
- Line length: 9.156 km (6 mi)
- Track gauge: 1,435 mm (4 ft 8 1/2 in) standard gauge
- Minimum radius: 4500m
- Electrification: AC 25 kV 50 Hz with overhead catenary
- Operating speed: 120 km/h (maximum speed)
- Maximum incline: 1.6%

The Beijing underground cross-city railway is a short railway connection in Beijing. It connects the important transportation hubs Beijing railway station and Beijing West railway station. For the most part it is underground, in a section known as the Qiansanmen Tunnel. The speed limit is 120 km/h. It also connects lines from southern and western areas with lines from northeast China. The railway has a length span of 9.156 km (5.689 mi), and has been officially operational since March 20, 2015.

It is used by conventional railway lines such as K7752 from Shijiazhuang to Chengde via Beijing West railway station and Beijing railway station, as well as the commuter rail Sub-Central line of the Beijing Suburban Railway, which started in December 2017.

== History ==
- In the early 1980s a plan was proposed to connect Beijing railway station to Beijing West railway station via a conventional railway. This was an important part of the overall planning of Beijing West railway station's renovation, originally announced as part of the "Eighth Five-Year Plan". However, due to technical difficulties and other factors, this project did not begin.
- December 24, 2005: A proposal was made with the aim of completing the construction within 2.5 years, in time for the 2008 Beijing Olympic Games.
- However, in 2007, the project was delayed and couldn't be completed before the Beijing Olympics.
- July 2013: The construction project was completed.
- December 19, 2014: The line passed static inspection.
- December 30, 2014: Test trains tested on the tracks.
- March 20, 2015: Beijing underground cross-city railway officially opened with the first trains running from Shijiazhuang to Chengde (K7742/7743, K7744/7741).
- May 15, 2016: Train Z621/622 and Z721/722 Beijing–Lhasa trains, and trains from Shenyang North railway station / Changchun railway station to Beijing West railway station, started to use the tunnel to travel from Beijing–Guangzhou Railway to Beijing–Harbin Railway.
- December 31, 2017: The commuter rail service in Beijing, the Sub-Central line of the Beijing Suburban Railway, started to use Beijing underground cross-city railway by CRH6A. The Sub-Central line runs from Beijing West railway station to Tongzhou railway station.
- October 11, 2022: Trains G7812/7813, G7814/7811 (Chengde South - Handan East) and G7816/7817, G7818/7815 (Chengde South - Shijiazhuang) started to use the tunnel, linking Beijing-Harbin HSR and Beijing-Guangzhou HSR.

== Construction ==
- Construction Unit: Beijing Railway Bureau
- Construction Unit: China Railway Liu Ju Group Limited, China Railway 16 Bureau Group Co., Ltd., China Railway Bureau Group, a company tunnel
- Designer: Third Railway Survey and Design Institute
- Supervisor: Academy of Railway Sciences Engineering Construction Supervision Department, China Railway Engineering Consulting Corporation, Beijing Railway Construction Engineering Co. Ltd.

== Main technical standards ==
- Railroad grade: I level
- Number of main lines: Double
- Minimum curve radius: General area 800 meters, 550 meters in difficult sections
- Limiting gradient: 1.6%
- Effective train length: 650 m
- Type of traction: Electric traction
- Rolling stock: HXD3D, SS9, CRH6
- Block type: Automatic block
