= Lee E-jun =

Taiwanese singer

- Born: 27 April 1969 (age 55); Taipei, Taiwan
- Occupation: Singer-songwriter
- Years active: 1987–present

Chinese name
Transcriptions
Standard Mandarin
- Hanyu Pinyin: Lǐ Yìjūn
Yue: Cantonese
- Jyutping: Lei^{5} Jik^{6} Gwan^{1}
- Musical career
- Also known as: Linda Lee, Lee Yik Kwan
- Genres: Cantopop, Mandopop, Hokkien pop
- Labels: What's Music (1987–2000); GMM Grammy (2000–2004); Himalaya Music (2006); Water Music (2011–present)

Lee E-jun (Chinese: 李翊君; pinyin: Lǐ Yìjūn, born 27 April 1969) is a Taiwanese singer.

Lee has released over thirty albums in Cantonese, Mandarin and Hokkien. She is best known for singing the theme songs for many television dramas adapted from Chiung Yao's novels, such as My Fair Princess (1998).

== Discography ==
=== Studio albums ===
- 1987: Ping ju (萍聚)
- 1988: Cherish Goodbye (珍重再見)
- 1988: You Are the Love of My Whole Life (你是我畢生的愛)
- 1988: Li Hualing (李華苓)
- 1989: Meeting Again (再回首)
- 1994: Black Rose (黑玫瑰)
- 1995: Promise (諾言)
- 1995: Can Lift Up, Can't Put Down (舉得起放抹落)
- 1996: Who Can Forbid My Love (誰能禁止我的愛)
- 1996: I'm Not Drunk (我没有醉)
- 1997: Tear's Drizzle (泪的小雨)
- 1998: Promising Lies (誓言謊言)
- 1999: You Love Her So Much (你那麼愛她)
- 1999: Yi wang qing shen (翊往情深)
- 2000: Fall in Love with a Lonely Man (愛上孤獨的男人)
- 2000: He ri jun zai lai (何日君再來)
- 2001: Rebirth (重生)
- 2001: Headwind, Tailwind (逆風順風)
- 2002: Obsessed (沉迷)
- 2005: Forever Love (永恒的愛)
- 2005: Be Brave to Love (勇敢的愛)
- 2006: Tian huang di lao (天荒地老)
- 2006: Hai ku shi lan (海枯石爛)
- 2011: Men Bad (男人坏)
- 2012: Fall in Love with Loneliness (愛上寂寞)
- 2013: You Bet You Pay (願賭服輸)
