= G399/400 Beijing–Changchun through train =

Railway service in China

The G399/400 Beijing–Changchun through train (Chinese: G399/400次北京南到长春高速动车组列车) is a Chinese railway running between the capital Beijing to Changchun, capital of Jilin express passenger trains by the Shenyang Railway Bureau, Changchun passenger segment responsible for passenger transport task, Changchun originating on the Beijing train. CRH380B Type Passenger trains running along the Beijing–Shanghai High-Speed Railway, Tianjin–Qinhuangdao High-Speed Railway, Qinhuangdao–Shenyang High-Speed Railway and Harbin–Dalian High-Speed Railway across Jilin, Liaoning, Hebei, Tianjin, Beijing and other provinces and cities, the entire 1103 km. Beijing South railway station to Changchun railway station running 6 hours and 21 minutes, use trips for G399; Changchun railway station to Beijing South railway station to run 6 hours and 17 minutes, use trips for G400.

The service of G399/400 was terminated on 25 June 2021, and all the G-series trains between Beijing and Changchun were thus allocated to Beijing–Shenyang High-Speed Railway. The fastest train starting from Changchun to Beijing became G906 which starts at Changchun railway station and ends at Beijing Chaoyang railway station.

== Current services ==
Northbound

- G951 Beijing Chaoyang (06:50) – Changchunxi (11:37)
- G953 Beijing Chaoyang (09:00) – Changchunxi (13:21)
- G955 Beijing Chaoyang (11:38) – Changchun (16:29)
- G957 Beijing Chaoyang (12:06) – Changchunxi (16:46)
- G959 Beijing Chaoyang (12:45) – Changchunxi (17:23)
- G905 Beijing Chaoyang (13:00) – Changchun (16:58)
- G961 Beijing Chaoyang (16:49) – Changchunxi (21:32)

Southbound

- G952 Changchun (07:15) – Beijing Chaoyang (12:21)
- G906 Changchun (08:30) – Beijing Chaoyang (12:30)
- G954 Changchunxi (11:18) – Beijing Chaoyang (16:11)
- G956 Changchunxi (11:58) – Beijing Chaoyang (16:46)
- G958 Changchunxi (13:52) – Beijing Chaoyang (18:32)
- G960 Changchun (16:51) – Beijing Chaoyang (21:48)
- G962 Changchunxi (17:26) – Beijing Chaoyang (22:09)

== See also ==
- Z61/62 Beijing-Changchun Through Train
- Z63/64 Beijing-Changchun Through Train
- D19/20 Beijing-Changchun Through Train
- D23/24 Beijing-Changchun Through Train
