= Gongzhufen =

Transport hub in Beijing, China

Coordinates: 39°44′N 116°04′E

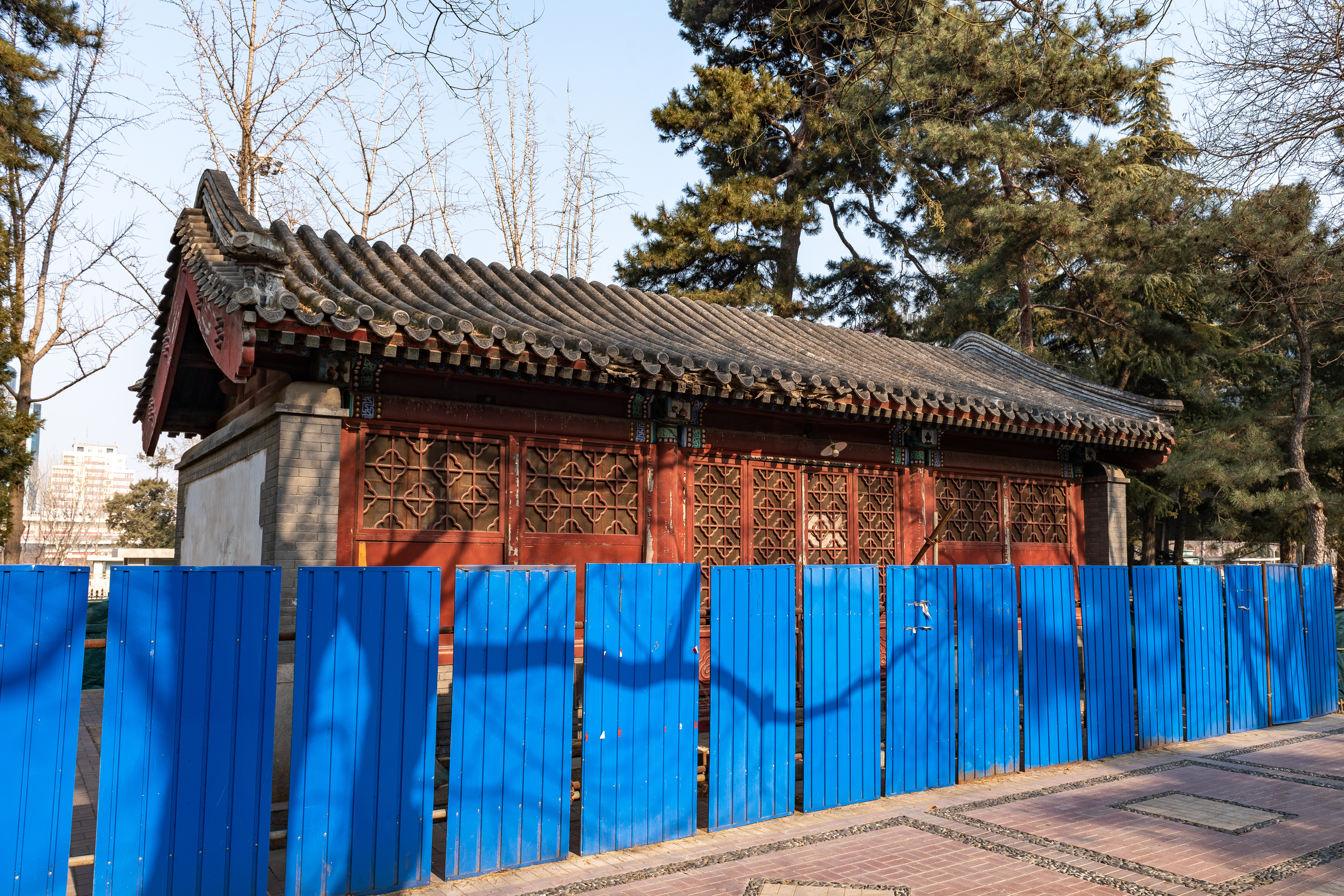
The only thing left for this "princess grave".

Gongzhufen (simplified Chinese: 公主坟; traditional Chinese: 公主墳; pinyin: Gōngzhǔfén) is a major traffic and public transportation hub in the Haidian District of western Beijing, China. The name literally means "Tomb of the Princesses", as it is the location of the tomb of the third and fourth daughters of Jiaqing Emperor of the Qing Dynasty, both of whom passed away in 1811.

Gongzhufen lies at the intersection of the 3rd Ring Road and Fuxing Road. Prior to the mid-1990s, there was a traffic circle at the intersection. Today, traffic is handled by a three-level cloverleaf interchange.

The area has several shopping centers, a bus terminal from which buses 32, 33, 64, 94, 370, 437, and 451 start, and the Gongzhufen Subway Station, which is served by Lines 1 and 10 of the Beijing Subway. Nearby landmarks include the CCTV Tower to the north, the China Military Museum to the east, and the Beijing West railway station in the southeast.
