= Beijing railway station =

Railway and subway station in Beijing

Beijing 北京 Add→{{rail-interchange}} Add→{{rail-interchange}}
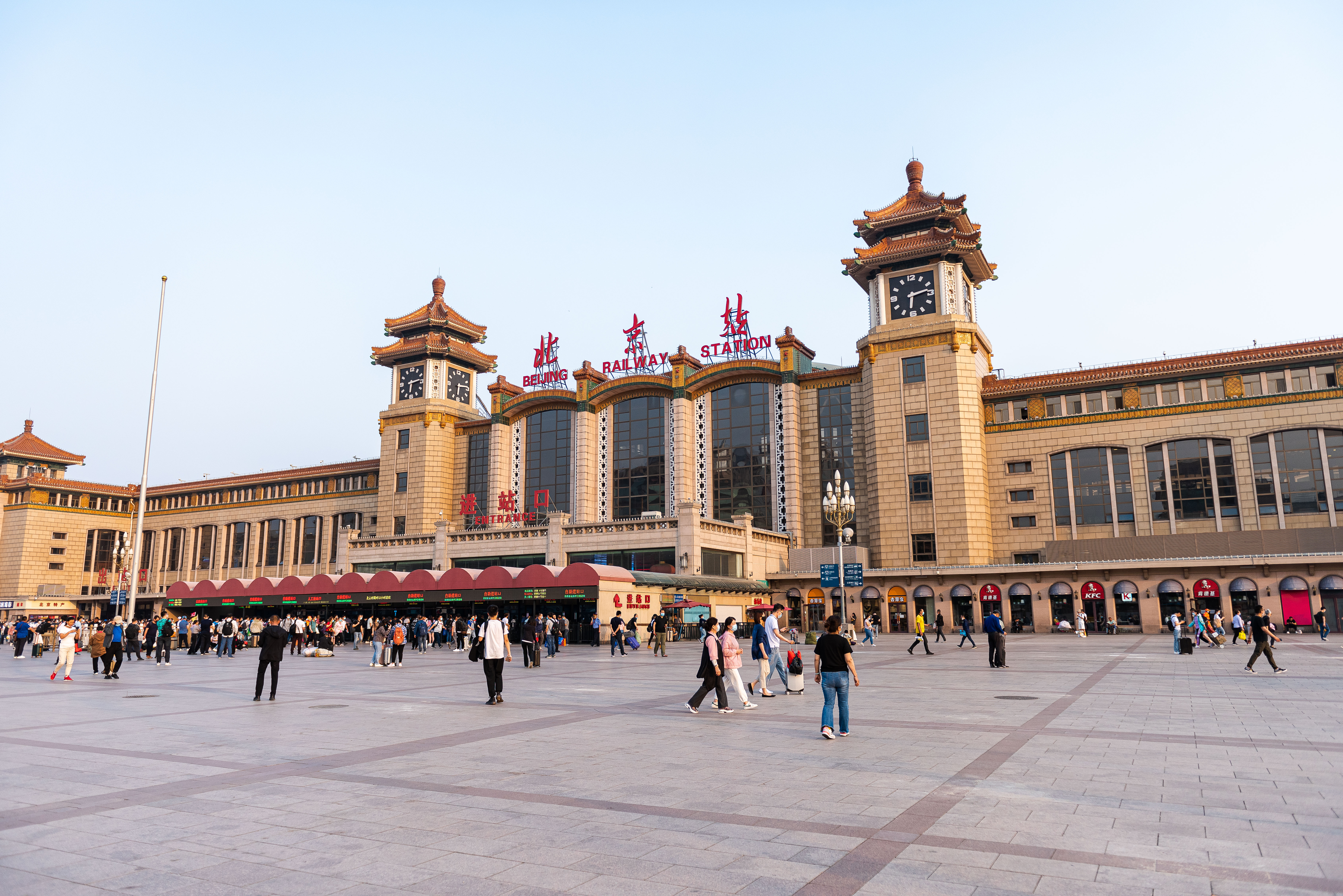
- Beijing railway station in May 2021

General information
- Location: Beijingzhan Jie, Dongcheng District, Beijing; China
- Coordinates: 39.9023°N 116.4210°E
- Operator: CR Beijing; Beijing Subway
- Lines: Beijing–Shanghai railway; Beijing–Harbin railway; Beijing–Chengde railway; Beijing underground cross-city railway; Beijing–Shenyang high-speed railway; Sub-Central line (Beijing Suburban Railway); Line 2 (Beijing Subway)
- Platforms: 8
- Connections: Bus terminal Subway station

Construction
- Structure type: At-grade
- Accessible: Yes

Other information
- Station code: Telegraph code: BJP; Pinyin code: BJI; TMIS code: 10001
- Classification: Top Class station

History
- Opened: 4 October 1959; 66 years ago 15 January 1971; 55 years ago
- Closed: None
- Former names: Zhengyangmendong; Beiping
Location
- Location within Beijing Location within China Location within Asia Location within Earth

Beijing railway station is a passenger railway station in Dongcheng District, Beijing. The station is located just southeast of the city centre inside the Second Ring Road with Beijing Station Street to the north and the remnants of the city wall between Chongwenmen and Dongbianmen to the south. The Beijing railway station opened in 1959 and was the largest train station in China at the time. Though superseded by the larger Beijing West and Beijing South stations, this station remains the only one located inside the old walled city. Trains entering and leaving the station pass by the Dongbianmen corner tower. With gilded eaves and soaring clock towers, the architecture of the railway blends traditional Chinese and socialist realist influence.

Generally, trains for northeast China (Shenyang, Dalian, Harbin) on the Beijing–Harbin railway, for Shandong (Jinan, Qingdao) and the Yangtze River Delta (Shanghai, Nanjing and Hangzhou) on the Beijing–Shanghai railway and some for Inner and the Republic of Mongolia depart from this station. Some international lines (notably the railway line linking Beijing to Moscow and to Pyongyang, North Korea (DPRK), amongst others), also depart from this station.

Beijing railway station used to be the eastern terminus of Beijing Subway's Line 1 until 1987, when the station became part of Line 2. More than 30 Beijing bus and trolleybus routes stop at or near the railway station.

== History ==
=== Predecessor station ===
In 1901, Zhengyangmen East Station was constructed south-east of Zhengyangmen, the gate south of Tiananmen Square. It was the terminus of the Beijing–Shanhaiguan Railway built by Imperial Railways of North China. Zhengyangmen East closed in 1959 with the opening of the Beijing railway station 2.5 km to the east, and eventually become part of the China Railway Museum.

=== Design and construction ===
To commemorate the Tenth Anniversary of the founding of the People's Republic of China, the Central Committee of the Chinese Communist Party in 1958 began the planning and construction of ten large-scale projects, known as the "Ten Great Buildings" to showcase the new outlook of the country and the Beijing railway station was amongst the projects undertaken.

In late October 1958, according to the early 1950 Beijing municipal government's construction and planning records, the design arrangements for the new railway station was commenced. The station's design was assigned to the Ministry of Railway Institute's third department (now the Third Railway Survey and Design Institute Group Co. Ltd) with the station house building chaired by then renowned architects Yang Tingbao (杨廷宝) and Chen Deng'ao (陈登鏊), the National Building and Industry Department and the Nanjing Institute of Architectural Design were to cooperate in the design tasks. The station's design progressed rapidly and by early December the same year, the whole design proposal was completed. On December 10, the design proposal was approved by the Central Committee. The then Premier Zhou Enlai was also very concerned about the design and construction of the new Beijing railway station, and dealt with aspects concerning the direction and positioning of station names to the layout of the VIP room environment. In determining the design program proposal, Zhou Enlai proposed that turrets be built on each of the two wings of the main building and this suggestion was adopted.

On 20 January 1959 the construction of the new station commenced with the number of construction workers reaching up to two million people during the peak stage and project investment amounted to 57.82 million yuan. Soviet experts were also hired to give technical guidance at the construction sites. In just over seven months, the project was completed on 10 September 1959. The new Beijing railway station covered an area of two hundred and fifty thousand square meters, the Station House Building site covered an area of 46,700 square meters (503,000 sq ft), the station plaza comprised an area of forty thousand square meters. Chairman Mao Zedong wrote the calligraphic characters in the station sign.

The Beijing railway station was one of the largest construction projects in mainland China during that time with modern facilities and it was also China's first large modern railway terminal. At the time of completion, the station has a twelve tracks and six railway platforms with canopies attached to them. The Station house building faced south and the architecture included both a Chinese traditional style and the Soviet Stalinist architecture. The twelve passenger waiting rooms comprised a total area of fourteen thousand square meters and was able to accommodate 14,000 waiting passengers. The inner complex of the Main Station Building contained a passenger waiting room, mother and child waiting room, movie theater, recreation hall, visitors' restaurants, post office, clinic and other facilities. The roof had two clock towers; bells marked 7 AM and 9 PM by playing "The East Is Red".

The Beijing station equipment was considered to be relatively advanced at its -time with four AC2-59 type escalators installed in the interior; the joint design and production of the escalators were coordinated by the Shanghai Jiao Tong University and Shanghai Elevator Company. The four sets of escalators were replaced during the 1980 and again during 1990; the most recent replacement of the elevators occurred in early 2005 - the design being a product of Otis Company.

== Operation ==
=== China Railway ===
Beijing 北京

General information
- Location: Beijingzhan Jie, Dongcheng District, Beijing; China
- Operator: China Railway Beijing Group
- Lines: Beijing–Shanghai railway; Beijing–Harbin railway; Beijing–Baotou railway; Beijing–Chengde railway; Beijing underground cross-city railway; Beijing–Shenyang high-speed railway; Sub-Central line (Beijing Suburban Railway)
- Platforms: 14 (6 island platforms, 2 side platforms)

History
- Opened: 1959; 67 years ago

Services
Preceding station	China Railway	Following station
Terminus	Beijing–Shanghai railway	Beijing South towards Shanghai
Terminus	Beijing–Harbin railway	Beijing East towards Harbin
Terminus	Beijing–Baotou railway	Beijing East towards Baotou
Terminus	Beijing–Chengde railway	Beijing East towards Chengde
Beijing West Terminus	Beijing underground cross-city railway	Terminus
Preceding station	China Railway High-speed	Following station
Terminus	Beijing–Shenyang high-speed railway Part of the Beijing–Harbin high-speed railway	Beijing Chaoyang towards Shenyang
Preceding station	Beijing Suburban Railway	Following station
Beijing West towards Liangxiang	Sub-Central line	Beijing East towards Qiaozhuang East
Location

After the completion of the new Beijing railway station, its transport capacity far exceeded the formerly used East railway station and it played an increasing role in heavy transport tasks, and today it is still Beijing's most important passenger railway station, and has the largest station traffic in China. The number of trains and traffic has also increased year by year: In 1959 there were 33 train lines; in 1966 there were forty train lines; in 1978 there were sixty-one train lines; in 1985 there were seventy-eight train lines; and by 1993 there were eighty-two train lines. During the late 1950s, the number of passengers using the railway transportation system was six million people a year, in the late 1960 it was eight million people a year, in the late 1970 it reached fifteen million a year, and after the reform and opening up period, the usage soared to more than thirty million people. To alleviate the transport pressure on the Beijing railway station, the Beijing Municipal Government and the Ministry of Railways in 1980 started the planning and construction of Beijing's second passenger station and hence the Beijing West railway station was completed in 1996, which provided transportation links for the Beijing–Guangzhou Railway and Beijing–Kowloon Railway helped alleviate pressure on the Beijing railway station - this led to a reduction in passenger traffic for the Beijing railway station to twenty million people.

Since 1976, the Beijing railway station had begun a series of upgrades to the passenger service facilities, for example a computer system had been set up for processing tickets, a TV monitoring screen, wireless communication, automatic broadcasting system, and extensions made to the railway platform expanded its length from 497 to 603 meters (1,631 to 1,978 ft) in order to meet the needs of the expanding transportation flow. In 1988, the Shanghai Electric Clock Factory installed China's first large screen display system in the Beijing railway station square. Between May 1998 and September 1999, the Ministry of Railways implemented a seismic strengthening project to the Beijing railway station and also introduced new passenger features such as a central air conditioning system, passenger guidance system, multi-functional radio broadcasting system. Since 18 June 2003, the Beijing railway station began an expansion of two new sites, comprising an area of 20,513 square meters (220,800 sq ft) and includes a specialized large parcel luggage line, renovations included the removal of the concrete canopy, alterations to the steel arch station poles, and alterations to the original site raised it from 1 to 1.2 meters.

In June 2008, in order to meet the needs of the Beijing Olympic Games, bilingual signs were created at the Beijing railway station to facilitate an overall increase in foreign tourists travelling to the games, in addition to putting up the English name "Beijing Railway Station", several other signs were also erected at station entrances, exits and ticket booths.

On 25 June 2021, G902/903 and G907/908 trains will be extended to Beijing railway station, thus the Beijing-Shenyang high-speed railway has charted trains arriving and departing at Beijing railway station.

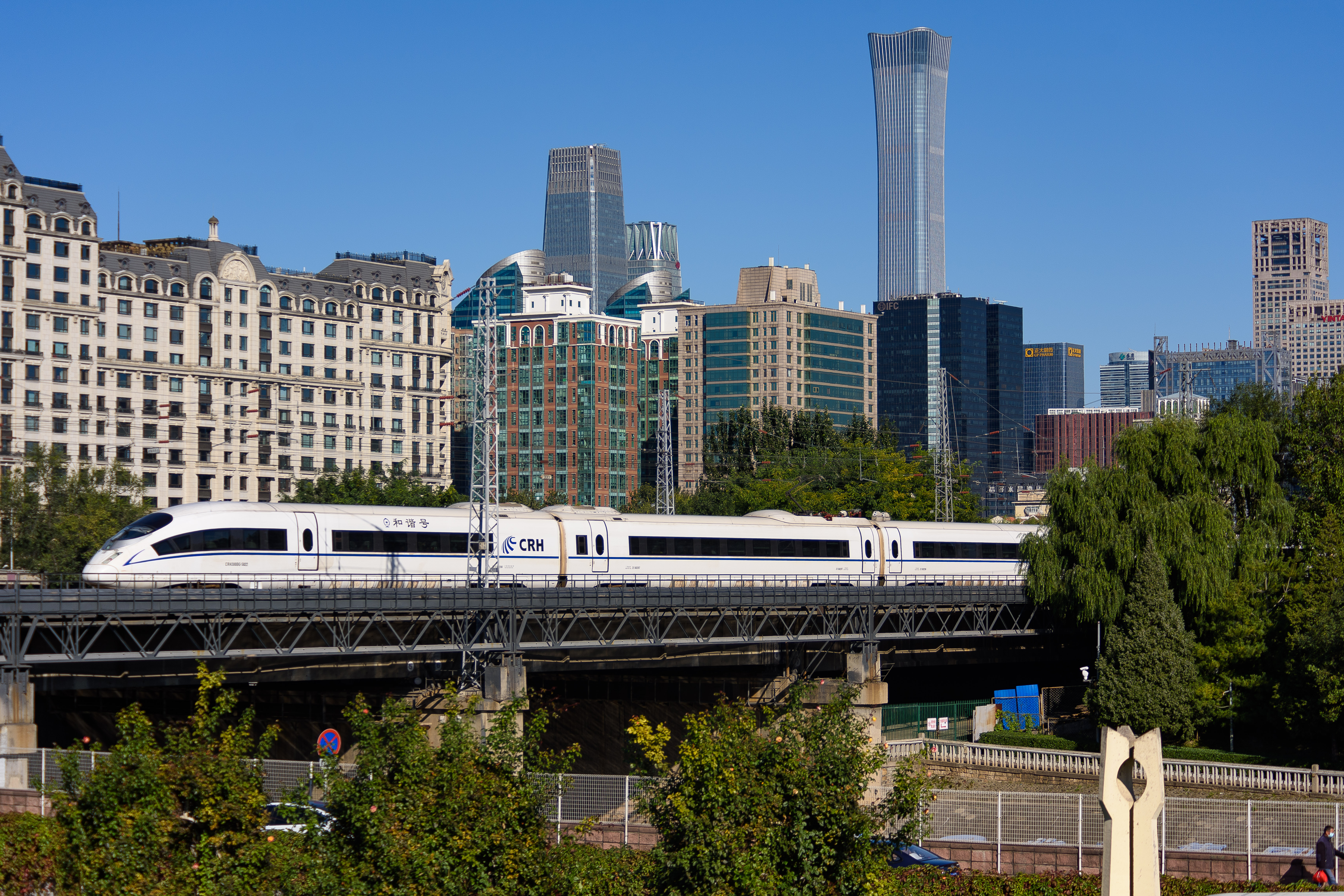
A train leaving the station in October 2021

=== Beijing Subway ===
Beijing Zhan station (Beijing Railway Station) 北京站
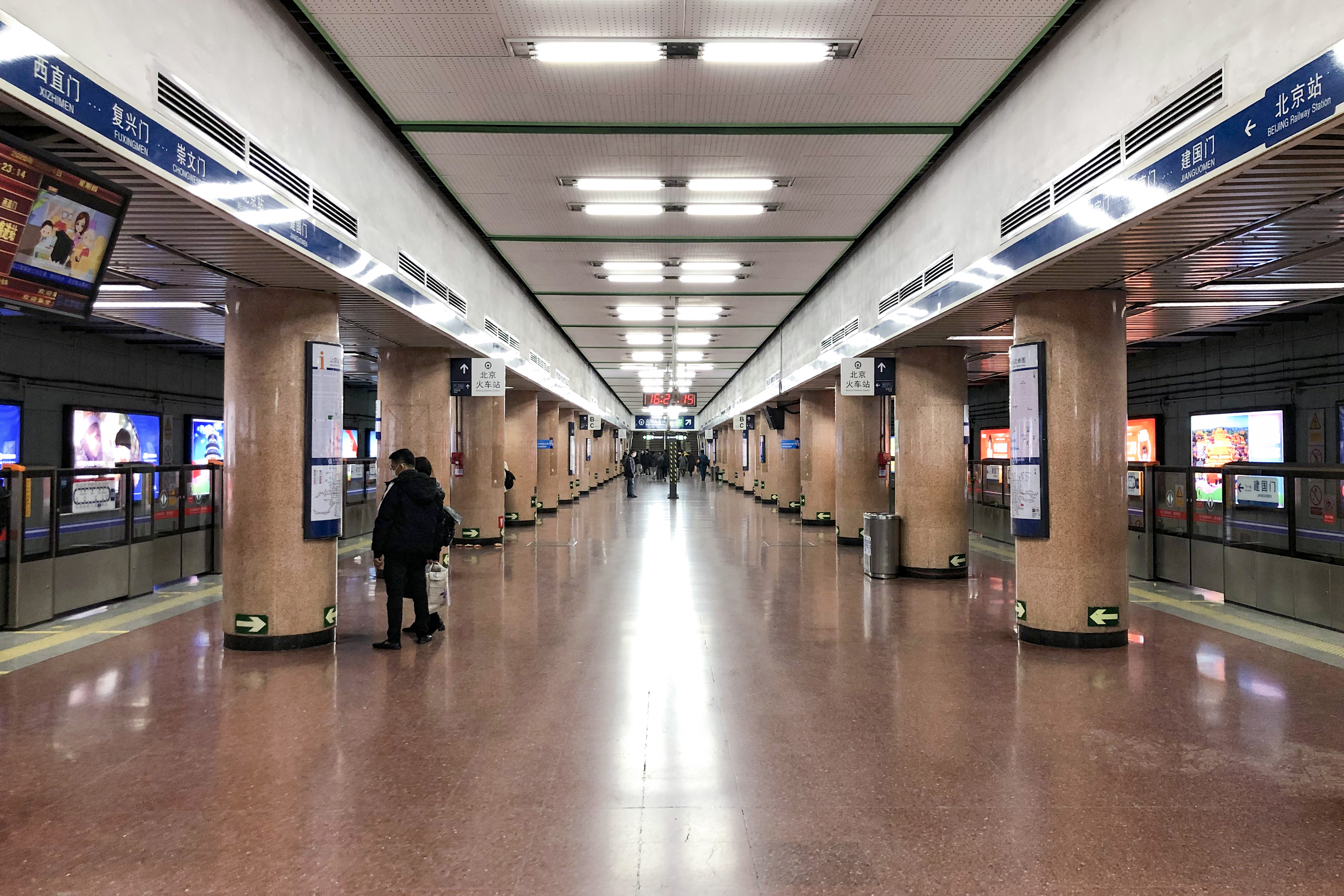
- Platform in December 2020

General information
- Location: Beijingzhan Jie, Dongcheng District, Beijing; China
- Operator: Beijing Mass Transit Railway Operation Corporation Limited
- Line: Line 2
- Platforms: 2 (1 island platform)
- Tracks: 2

Construction
- Structure type: Underground
- Accessible: Yes

Other information
- Station code: 210

History
- Opened: 15 January 1971; 55 years ago

Services
Preceding station	Beijing Subway	Following station
Jianguomen outer loop / anticlockwise	Line 2	Chongwen Men inner loop / clockwise
Location

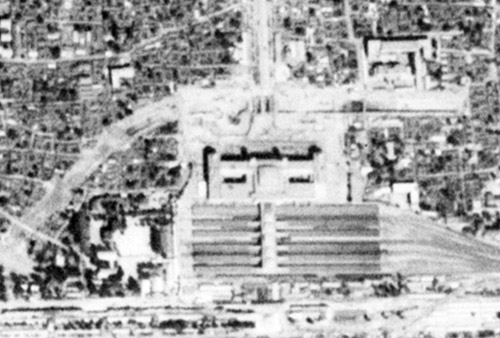
Satellite image of Subway Station of Beijing railway station in construction (1967-09-20)

The Beijing railway station is a transportation hub in Beijing.

- Beijing Subway: Line 2 stops at the Beijing railway station, with Entrance D on the station plaza.
- Beijing Bus routes and stops near the station:
  - Beijing Station East (北京站东) 250 m (820 ft) east of the station plaza: 9, **10**, **20**, **25**, **29**, **39**, 52, 59, **122**, **203**, **204**, **209**, **403**, **420**, **434**, **637**, **638**, **639**, **666**, **668**, 673, 674, 729, **804**, **805**, **827**, **829**, **938**, **957**
  - Beijing Station West (北京站西) 280 m (919 ft) west of the station plaza: **103**, **104**, 208, **209**, **211**, 673
  - Beijing Station Front Street (北京站前街) 290 m (951 ft) north of the station plaza: 9, **24**, 204, 673, 674, 729, 804, 特2
  - Beijing Station Intersection East (北京站口东) on Chang'an Avenue, 600 m (1,969 ft) north of the station plaza: 1, 52, 90, 99, 120, 126, 205, 208, 420, 637, 666, 728, 特2
  - Jianguomen Bridge South (建国门桥南) 900 m (2,953 ft) east of the station plaza on the Second Ring Road: 25, 39, 43, 44, 52, 122, 434, 637, 638, 750, 特2
- Beijing Airport Bus **Route 3** has a terminus located about 300 m (984 ft) east of the station plaza.

Bus route numbers in bold denotes bus terminus.

==== Station layout ====
The station has an underground island platform.

==== Exits ====
There are four exits, lettered A, B, C, and D. Exit A is accessible.

== Gallery ==
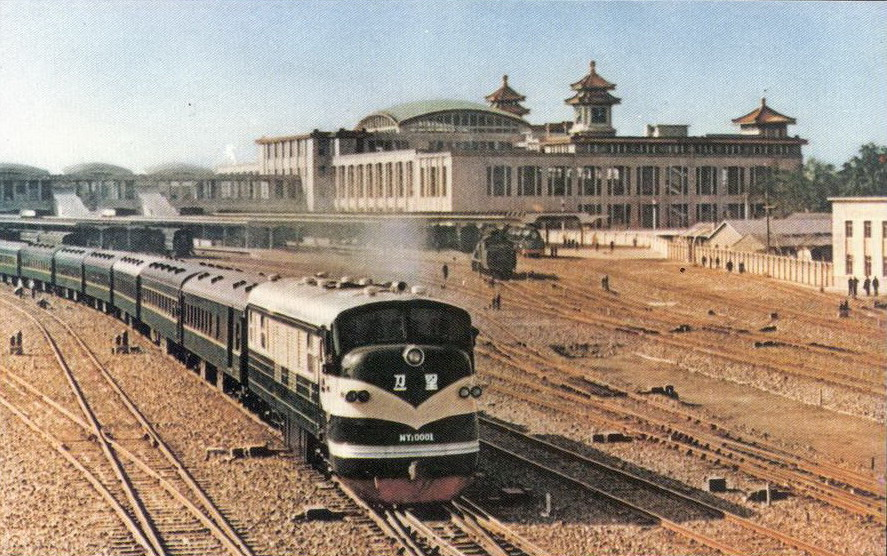
An NY1 diesel locomotive hauling a passenger train out of the Beijing railway station in 1959

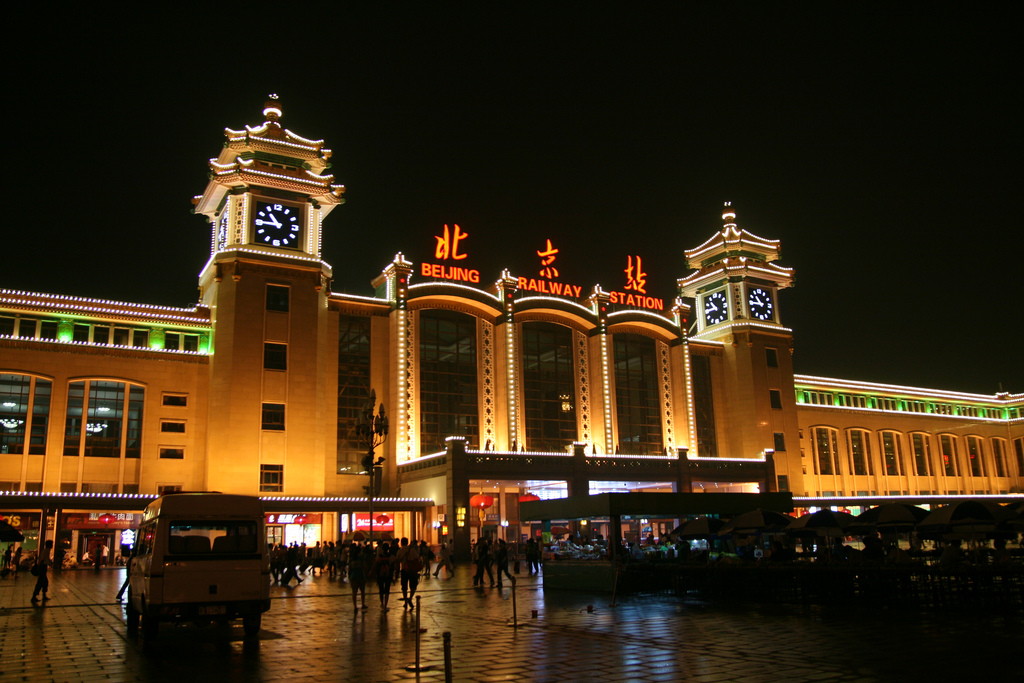
The Beijing railway station at night in 2008 after the station's English sign was added in advance of the 2008 Summer Olympic Games

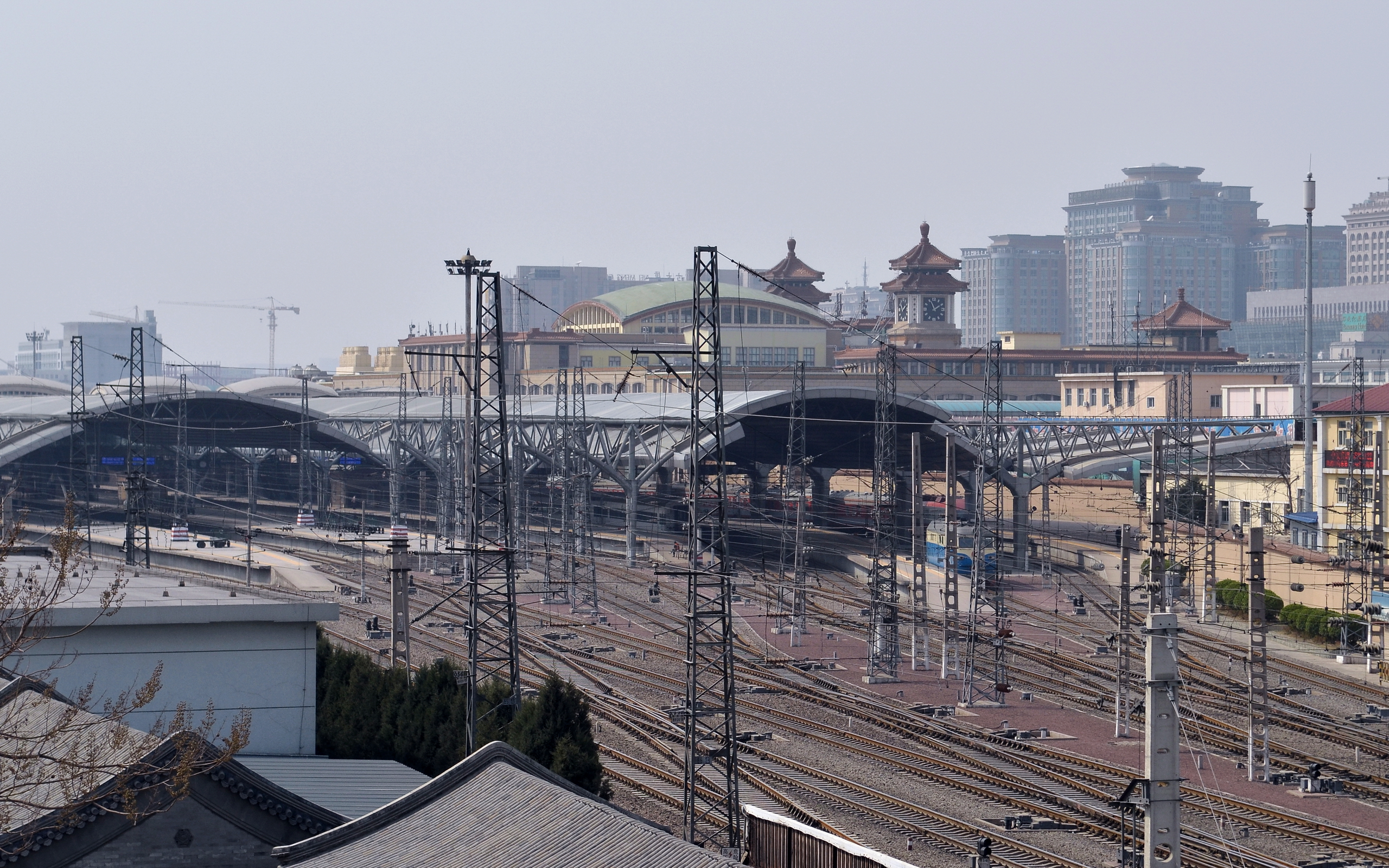
The Beijing railway station in 2012, after the electrification of the tracks
