= Universal Resort station =

Beijing Subway station

Universal Resort 环球度假区
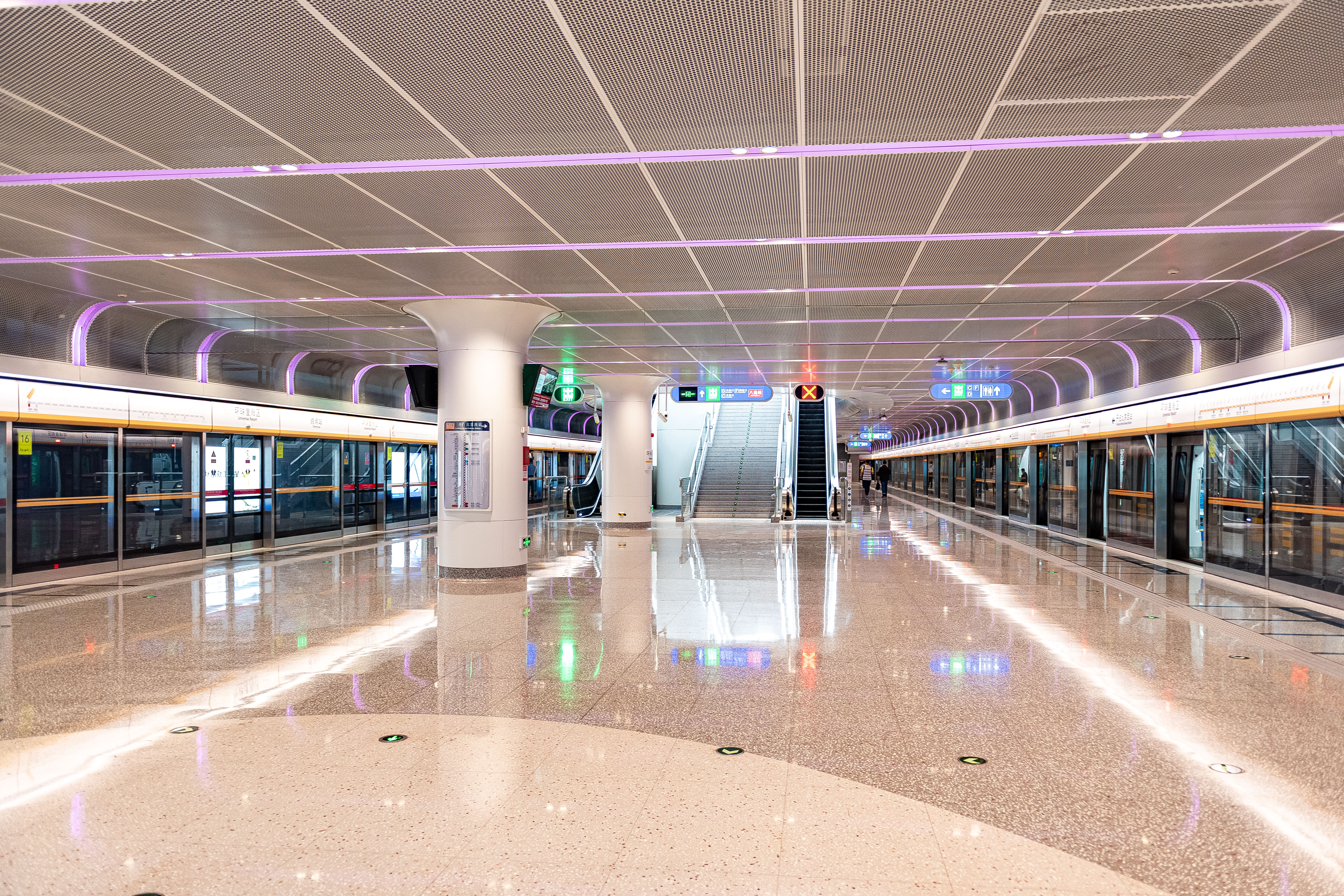
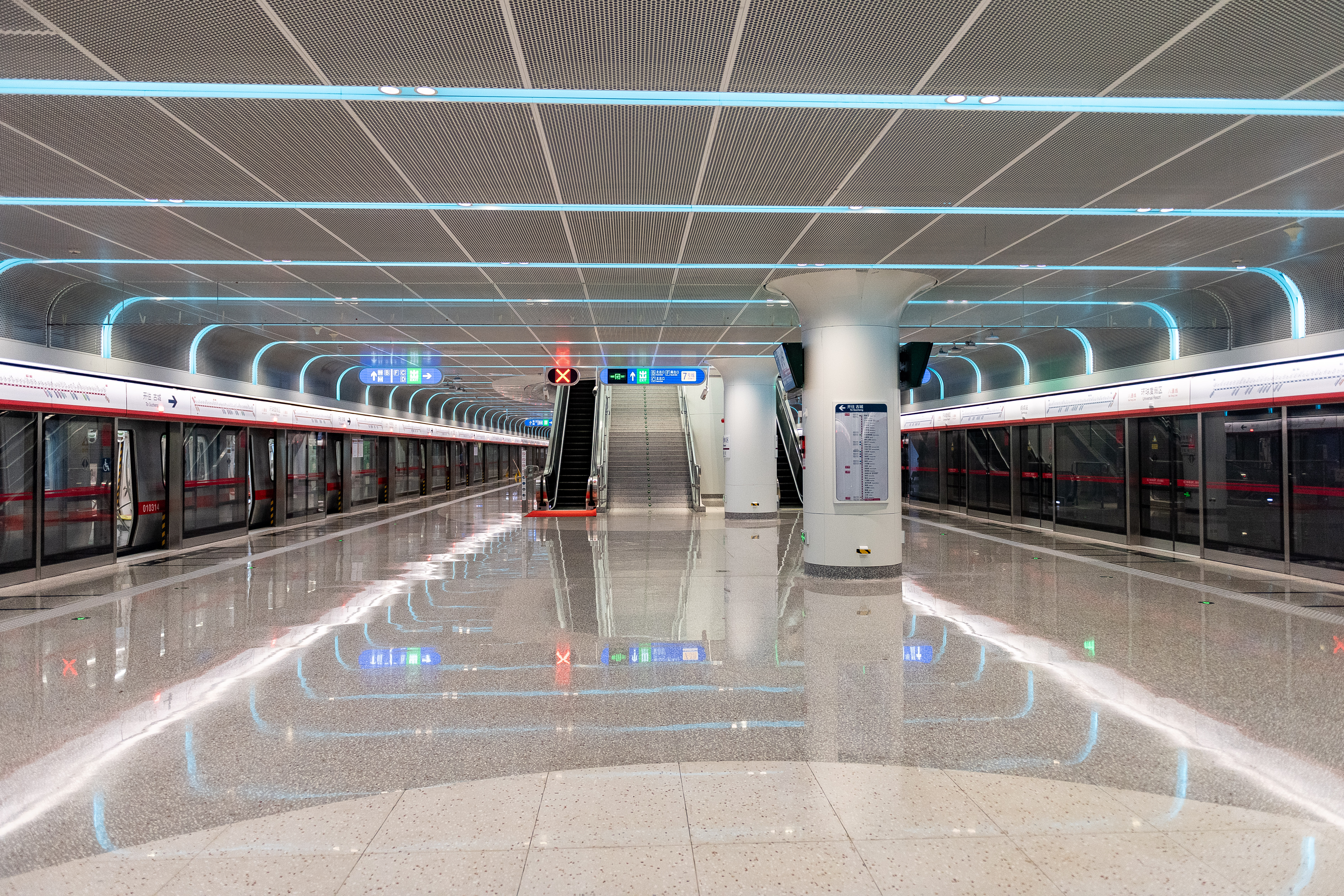
- Line 7 platform Batong line platform

General information
- Location: Universal Beijing Resort, Wenjing Subdistrict, Tongzhou District, Beijing; China
- Coordinates: 39.847936°N 116.673142°E
- Operator: Beijing Mass Transit Railway Operation Corporation Limited
- Lines: Line 7 Batong line
- Platforms: 4 (2 island platforms)
- Tracks: 4

Construction
- Structure type: Underground
- Accessible: Yes

History
- Opened: August 26, 2021; 4 years ago

Services
Preceding station	Beijing Subway	Following station
Huazhuang towards Beijing West railway station	Line 7	Terminus
Huazhuang towards Gucheng	Batong line	Terminus
Location
- Location within Beijing

Universal Resort station (Chinese: 环球度假区站; pinyin: Huánqiú Dùjiàqū zhàn) is a subway station on Line 7 and the Batong line of the Beijing Subway. It is located near the entrance of Universal Beijing Resort. The station opened on 26 August 2021.

== Station layout ==
Both the line 7 and Batong line stations have underground island platforms. The Batong line platform is special in that it is the only island platform in the system where trains arrive and open their doors on the right side of the train instead of the conventional left side. There are 6 exits, lettered A, B, C, D, E and F. Exits A to E are accessible directly, whilst exit F is accessible via a ramp.

== Gallery ==
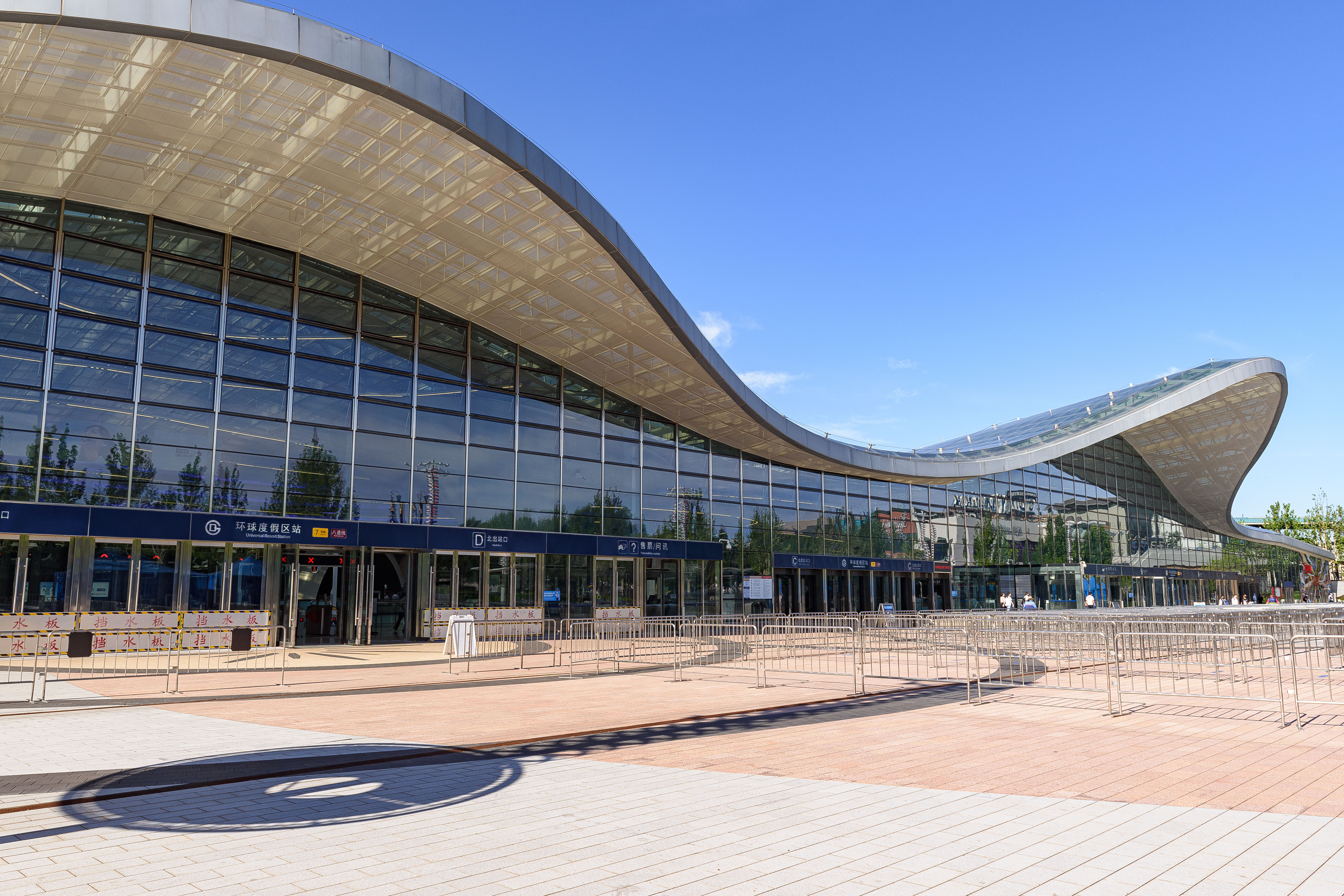
North facade

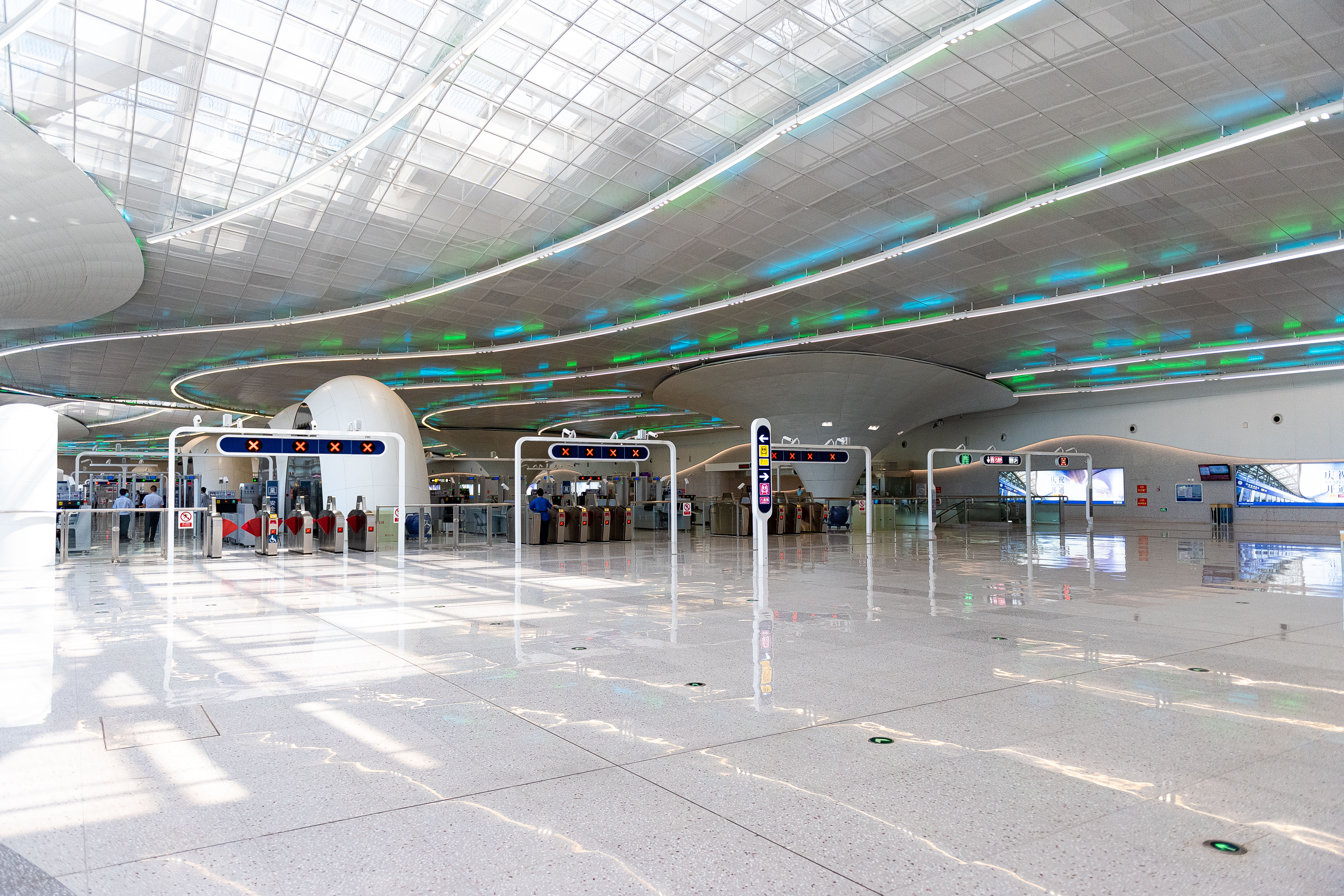
Concourse

== See also ==
- Universal Beijing
