= Beijing West railway station =

Railway and subway interchange station in Beijing

Beijingxi 北京西
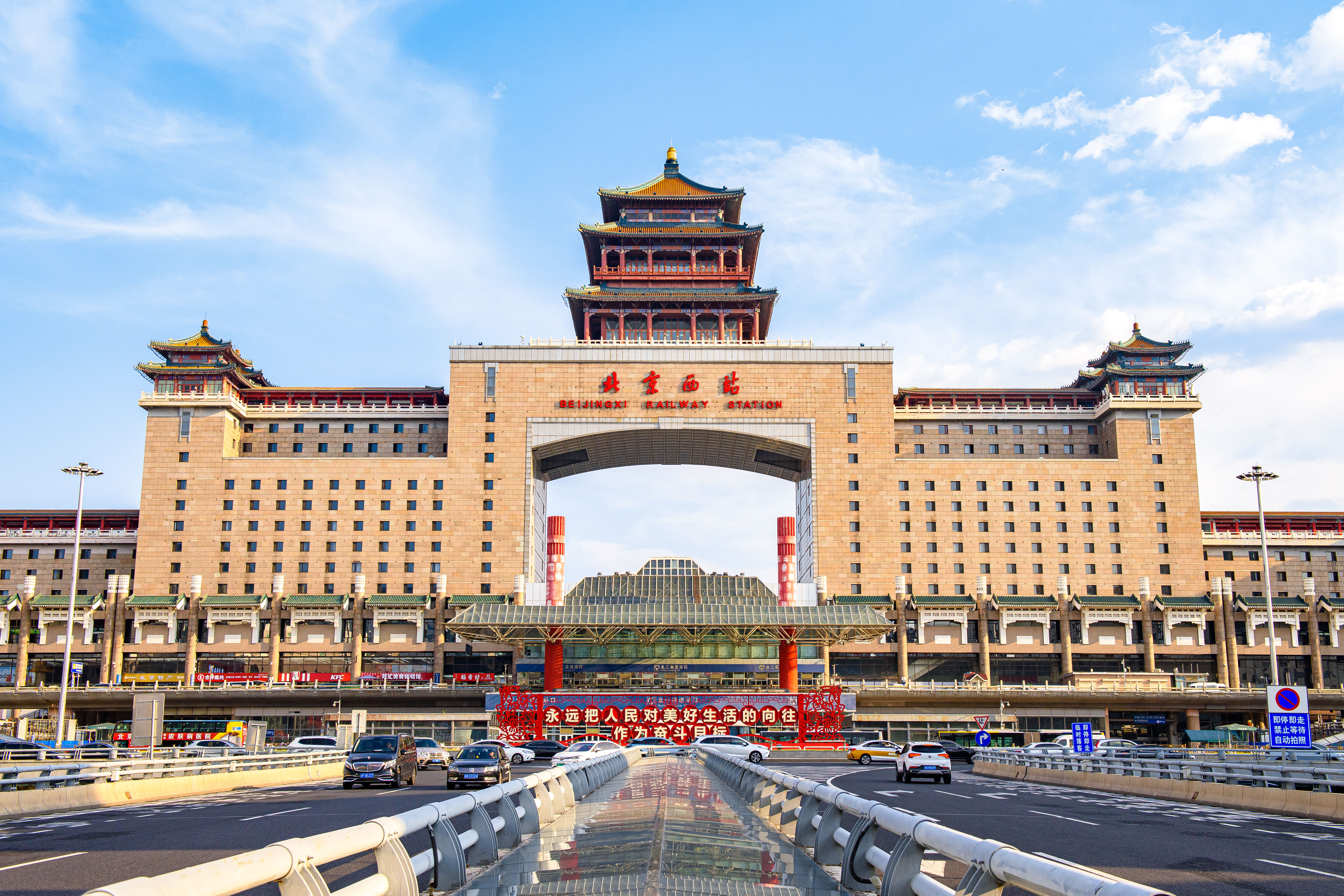
- Beijing West station in June 2025

General information
- Other names: Beijing West
- Location: 118 Lianhuachi Donglu, Fengtai District, Beijing; China
- Coordinates: 39°53′42″N 116°19′19″E
- Operator: CR Beijing; Beijing Subway
- Connections: Bus terminal

History
- Opened: 21 January 1996; 30 years ago 31 December 2011; 14 years ago
Location
- Location within Beijing

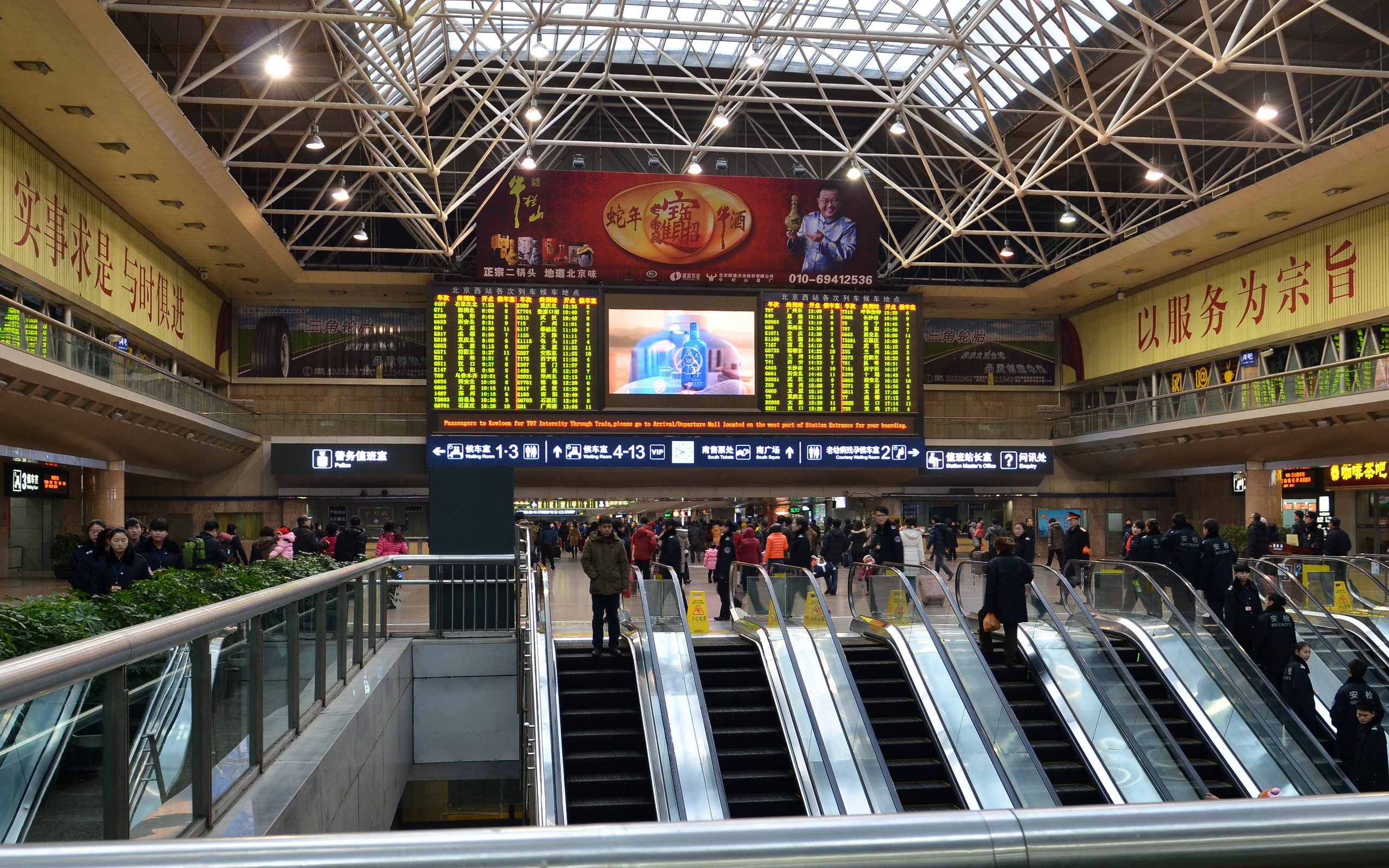
The departure hall in Beijing West railway station, located on the second floor.

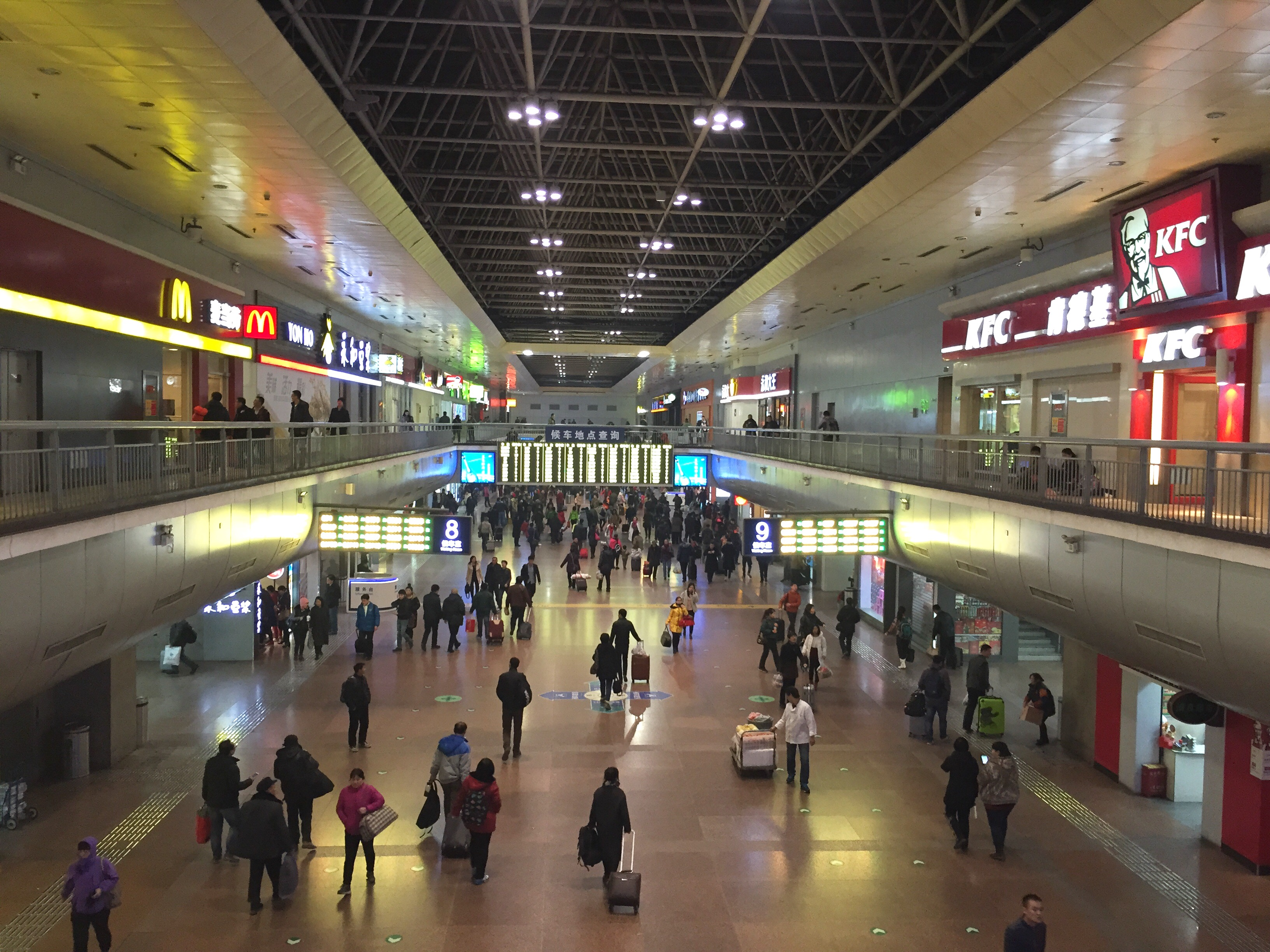
Third floor inside the Beijing West Railway Station.

Beijingxi (Beijing West) railway station (Chinese: 北京西站; pinyin: Běijīngxī Zhàn), colloquially referred to as West Station (Chinese: 西客站), is located in western Beijing's Fengtai District. Opened in early 1996 after three years of construction, it was the largest railway station in Asia with an area of 510,000 m^{2} (5,500,000 sq ft), before being surpassed by Shanghai Hongqiao railway station in platform capacity. The station serves in average 150,000–180,000 passengers per day with a maximum of 400,000 people per day. It was expanded during the 2000s decade, during which several platforms were added. It also has a fairly large number of car-parking spaces.

== Overview ==
The construction concept of Beijing West railway station began as early as 1959. It was planned and researched three times in history, but the first two were put on hold for political and economic reasons. For the third time, in 1989, the preparatory work, adjustment planning, and re-reporting were resumed and finally approved by the state. Beijing West railway station project was jointly funded by the Beijing Municipal Government and the Ministry of Railways. It was a key project in China's eighth five-year plan with a total investment of 6.5 billion yuan.

After the completion of the Beijing West railway station, the passenger pressure at the Beijing railway station was greatly alleviated. Beijing West station is the passenger train departure station of Beijing–Guangzhou high-speed railway, the two main railway lines in China: Beijing–Guangzhou railway (connected via the Beijing-Guangzhou railway west long link) and the Beijing–Kowloon railway, and a high-speed railway line. Most passenger trains in China's Central South, South China, Southwest, and Northwest China depart from Beijing West Railway Station. As of May 2011, Beijing West railway station had received more than 110 trains per day, of which about 100 departed. The Beijing underground cross-city railway, which passes through the urban area of Beijing and connects to Beijing railway station, was opened to traffic on 20 March 2015.

Beijing railway station is one of the transportation hubs in Beijing. There are bus hubs in North Square and South Square. A large number of buses depart from there; a taxi rank is also built underground; and the subway station reserved for construction has been completed by the end of 2011, a transfer station between Line 7 and Line 9.

Beijing West railway station's architectural style, building quality, design and planning have been criticised and controversial since its opening, but despite this, the station is still one of Beijing's most eye-catching buildings. At the end of 2007, the "Beijing New Landmarks Selection" event sponsored by the Beijing News announced the top ten new landmarks in Beijing after the public vote in January 2008. Beijing West railway station unexpectedly took 51,335 votes, second only to the National Stadium, becoming the new landmark in Beijing with the second most votes.

== History ==
=== Background ===
As early as the 1950s, the concept of building the second passenger-railway station for Beijing and the underground diameter line had already taken shape. In the autumn of 1959, when the Beijing railway station, one of the "Ten Great Buildings" erected in celebration of the 10th anniversary of the National Day of the People's Republic of China, was just completed, the then Premier of the State Council, Zhou Enlai, during the process of reviewing the planning of Beijing's railway, affirmed the suggestion of a west passenger station in Beijing. In the general layout of the Beijing Railway Hub master plan revised in September 1960, the idea at the time was to use Beijing West Railway Station and Beijing Railway Station as the main passenger terminal of the hub, and may connect the two major stations through the center of Beijing through four parallel underground tunnels. The site of the West Railway Station is directly opposite the Gongzhufen (Tomb of the Princess). The Beijing Municipal Government has correspondingly reserved land for the lotus pond that was still in the suburbs in the urban master plan. Therefore, for a long period of time thereafter, the lotus pond area has been a warehouse area dominated by simple bungalows, and no permanent building had been constructed. However, due to the impact of the reduction in construction scale during the three-year difficult period, the planning has not made much progress. The subsequent start of the Cultural Revolution led to the suspension of Beijing's overall urban master plan and the abolition of the planning agency.

=== Planning ===
==== The first plan (1975–76) ====
In January 1975, the first session of the 4th National People's Congress was convened. Deng Xiaoping was elected as Vice Premier of the State Council and began to preside over the daily work of the Central Committee and the State Council; Wan Li was then appointed as the Minister of Railways, and was responsible for rectifying the chaotic railway transportation system at that time. In March of the same year, the Central Committee of the Chinese Communist Party issued as a mobilization order for a comprehensive rectification of the railway, which soon achieved results and then proposed to build Beijing West Railway Station again. At that time, the railway department and the planning department were still very vague about the site selection and construction plan of Beijing West Railway Station. There was no detailed design before, and the planned underground diameter line was not retained or the technical plan was not finalized. As a result, the design of Beijing West Railway Station, such as whether to choose a through-type or end-type, was also difficult to decide. After consultation between the Ministry of Railways and the Beijing Municipal Government, it was decided to jointly establish a planning working group to be responsible for studying and proposing the site selection and construction plan of the West Railway Station, while the Third Design Institute of the Ministry of Railways (now China Railway Design Group Co., Ltd.) and Beijing Architectural Design Institute (Now Beijing Architectural Design and Research Institute Co., Ltd.) were responsible for specific technical work.

After some investigation, comparison and discussion, the planning working group came up with the preliminary plan for Beijing West railway station in November 1975 and determined that the Beijing West station was a pass-through station. The station's site is located at the southwest corner of Lianhua Bridge. The road runs northwest–southeast, adopts a triangular square, and the station faces the center of the overpass. However, the political situation changed again soon after, affected by the "Counterattack the Right-Deviationist Reversal-of-Verdicts Trend" in 1976, and the site plan was shelved without approval.

==== The second plan (1981–85) ====
Entering the 1980s, with the gradual implementation of the reform and opening up policy, the pressure of China's railway transportation infrastructure has increased greatly, and transportation capacity was tight. By 1981, Beijing's railway passenger volume increased sharply. The hub station operated a total of 108 pairs of passenger trains every day, with an average daily passenger volume of 352,000. As the largest railway passenger station in Beijing at the time, Beijing Station was already overloaded. In 1981, Beijing Station's annual passenger flow was 27.72 million, equivalent to a daily passenger flow of 78,000. On 3 October 1981, the then Mayor of Beijing Jiao Ruoyu and Secretary of the Municipal Party Committee Duan Junyi reported on Beijing's railway transport situation to Vice Premier Wan Li and talked about the design and planning of the Beijing West Railway Station. This was the third such occurrence in the history of Beijing's Municipal Government. It is proposed to construct the Beijing West station as soon as possible. In early December 1981, the Beijing Railway Bureau issued a letter to the Ministry of Railways and the Beijing Municipal Government to apply for the construction of the Beijing West Railway Station, and the preliminary design was officially launched. Subsequently, the planning team headed by former Minister of Railways Lu Zhengcao, together with personnel from the Ministry of Railways, Beijing Railway Bureau, and the Ministry of Railways Third Design Institute, conducted an on-site survey to select a site for the station. The team members once climbed a small hill on the north bank of the Lotus Pond to overlook the entire area. Because it was the dry season at the time and the groundwater in the Lotus Pond area had been over-extracted for many years, the pond of more than 20 hectares had dried up, was overgrown with weeds, and was empty and desolate. The design team believed that this place did not occupy arable land, required less demolition, was in line with the plan, and saved money. On the spot, they instructed the Ministry of Railways Third Design Institute to arrange the West Station according to this location and submit the design drawings within three months. After the meeting, the team conveyed the site selection opinion to the Beijing Municipal Government for comment.

==== The third plan (1989–1993) ====
By the end of the 1980s, the problem of insufficient passenger transport capacity at the Beijing hub railway had become increasingly serious. It was even more difficult for Beijing Railway Station, the only main passenger station, and two auxiliary passenger stations (Beijing North and Beijing South) with insufficient equipment and capacity to cope with the demand. These three stations had not been expanded on a large scale for more than 30 years, while the railway passenger volume in Beijing had increased fourfold between 1970 and 1988. The construction of Beijing West Railway Station had become an urgent need. In February 1989, the Beijing Municipal Government formally proposed the construction of Beijing West Railway Station again. In March of the same year, the Beijing Municipal Government took the lead in establishing the "Beijing West Railway Station Preliminary Working Group" and convened a number of design institutes with certain strength across the country to participate in the architectural design competition. At the same time, with the approval of the State Council, the preliminary relocation task for the construction of Beijing West Railway Station was launched in 1989. The area around Beijing West Railway Station was the Xibianmen freight yard of Guang'anmen Railway Station and many factories and residential areas. The large amount of demolition work, high difficulty and high cost became a prominent problem in the construction of the project. At that time, the total national investment in the project was 2.3 billion yuan, and the demolition alone cost more than one billion yuan.

In March 1990, the working group compiled the "Beijing West Railway Station Planning and Task Book", and the Yangfangdian Road plan that had been agreed upon as early as 1983 was officially "thawed". Starting from August 1990, seven design units were selected for architectural plans. After several rounds of argumentation and selection of multiple design plans, the implementation design plan was determined. On 30 September 1990, the Beijing Municipal Government, the Ministry of Railways, and the Ministry of Posts and Telecommunications submitted the "Basis for Modifying the Planning and Task Book of Beijing West Railway Station" to the State Planning Commission, proposing an investment of RMB 2 billion, construction to start in 1991, opening in 1993, and finishing work to be completed in 1994. In March 1991, the State Council formally approved the design task book of Beijing West Railway Station.

=== Construction ===
At 4 pm on 19 January 1993, then-Premier Li Peng, Vice Premier Zou Jiahua, and others laid the foundation stone for Beijing West Railway Station, marking the beginning of the construction of Beijing West Railway Station. At the same time, the 28-kilometer-long West Chang Link Line connecting the Beijing-Guangzhou Railway was fully started. Since Beijing West Railway Station was required to be ready for operation by the end of 1995, the construction progress was extremely tight. More than 10 construction companies were directly led by the General Construction Headquarters to carry out the construction, including Beijing Construction Engineering Group, Beijing Urban Construction Group, the Railway Construction Engineering Bureau, Beijing Construction Group, China Construction First Engineering Bureau, Beijing Municipal Engineering Corporation, Railway Construction Corporation, the 16th Engineering Bureau of the Ministry of Railways, the 3rd Engineering Bureau of the Ministry of Railways, Beijing Railway Bureau Engineering Corporation, the Ministry of Railways Communication Signal Company and the Electrification Engineering Bureau, etc., with a total of more than 30,000 people involved in the construction work. By the end of 1993, the main station area of the West Railway Station had taken shape; in 1994, 24-hour uninterrupted construction began, with the process back-to-back without any gaps. In April 1995, interior and exterior decoration and equipment installation were fully launched, and the connecting-line track-laying project approached the station.

On 6 June 1995, Jiang Zemin, General Secretary of the CPC Central Committee, inscribed the name of Beijing West Railway Station. On the morning of 28 September 1995, the first trial train arrived at Beijing West Railway Station via the Xichang Link Line. In the afternoon of the same day, the two tower clocks in front of the main station building rang for the first time. On 11 October of the same year, Li Ruihuan, then Chairman of the National Committee of the Chinese People's Political Consultative Conference, visited Beijing West Railway Station. On 7 November, Jiang Zemin visited Beijing West Railway Station and listened to the report of the West Railway Station Construction Headquarters in the VIP Hall II of the West Railway Station. He also viewed the 20,000-square-meter underground comprehensive hall and the exterior of the North Railway Station Building.

At the same time as Beijing West Railway Station was established, there were 11 railway stations and sections, including Beijing West Locomotive Depot, Vehicle Depot, Engineering Depot, Electrical Depot, Water and Power Depot, Power Supply Depot, Construction Depot, Train Depot, Living Station, Ticket Center and Public Security Depot, all of which belonged to the Beijing Railway Bureau at that time.

=== Renovation and Expansion ===
The design capacity of Beijing West Railway Station is 60 to 70 pairs of trains per day, but the actual number of trains sent during the peak period of the Spring Festival travel rush is as high as 90 to 100 pairs. This overload operation puts great pressure on the already imperfect station facilities. In 2001, the Beijing Municipal Government took the opportunity of Beijing's bid for the Olympic Games to launch the "First Impression of Beijing" project for the Capital Airport and its surrounding areas, and Beijing's major railway stations and their surrounding environments. As a result, the West Railway Station District Management Committee carried out a comprehensive renovation and transformation of the public facilities and venues of Beijing West Railway Station. However, the West Railway Station's capacity to receive and send trains was still tight. In the second half of 2003, the Ministry of Railways and the Beijing Railway Bureau launched the second phase of the Beijing West Railway Station project, adding platforms 7, 8, and 9 to the original six platforms. After the project was completed, the design capacity of Beijing West Railway Station to send trains per day was increased to 137 pairs. At the same time, the station platforms were extensively renovated, including improving lighting facilities, renovating awnings, and raising platform heights. On 2 October of the same year, the entry-exit joint inspection hall of Beijing West Railway Station was put into use for passengers of the Beijing-Kowloon Through Train (Z97), and the Beijing-Kowloon Through Train no longer stopped at Changping Station. The renovated canopy of Beijing West Railway Station is the first large-span steel structure canopy in China.

In 2005, in order to cooperate with the renovation of Beijing South Railway Station, Beijing West Railway Station expanded Platform 9 and built a new Platform 10 to divert some of the passenger flow from Beijing South Railway Station. In addition, during the expansion project, the canopies of Platforms 1 to 7 were rebuilt and new canopies were built for Platforms 8 to 10. A large-span, curved, steel truss structure without platform columns was used.

In February 2009, more than 13 million passengers boarded and disembarked at Beijing West Railway Station during the 2009 Spring Festival travel rush (Chunyun), setting a record since the station was built .

According to the "Medium and Long-Term Railway Network Planning (2008 Adjustment)", the routes introduced into the Beijing hub have been adjusted accordingly. The Beijing railway hub has formed a layout of seven passenger stations: Beijing Station, Beijing South Station, Beijing West Station, Beijing North Station, Tongzhou Station, Xinghuo Station and Fengtai Station. As the reconstruction and expansion plan of Fengtai Station has been shelved, the Beijing-Shijiazhuang Passenger Dedicated Line will be introduced to Beijing West Station in the near future, and will be introduced to Fengtai Station after the new Fengtai Station is completed. To this end, Beijing West Railway Station needs to undergo the largest-scale renovation since its establishment. According to the documents "Approval on the Feasibility Study of the Beijing-Shijiazhuang Passenger Dedicated Line to Beijing West Railway Station Renovation Project" and "Approval on the Preliminary Design of the Beijing-Shijiazhuang Passenger Dedicated Line to Beijing West Railway Station Renovation Project" issued by the Ministry of Railways, Beijing West Railway Station was to carry out renovations in four aspects: elevated waiting room, passenger service system engineering, VIP waiting room in the south station building, and related renovations of hub transfer facilities. The main projects include closing the skylight in the existing elevated waiting room between the second to ninth platforms of the station, adding 6,600 square meters of elevated waiting space; adding paper magnetic card ticket machines, automatic ticket machines and necessary network equipment; transforming the second floor of the ticket center in the south station building into a VIP area; and opening up the south exit of the east and west exit passages so that passengers can directly reach the South Square transportation hub. The renovation of the elevated waiting room was originally scheduled to start in early April 2012. As a result, the running times of 159 trains were adjusted. However, the railway department considered that the expansion of the elevated waiting room would not only be costly, but would also bring inconvenience to the platform with columns. Therefore, the renovation of the elevated waiting room was eventually cancelled. Instead, the existing waiting room resources were used to coordinate the passenger flow of the Beijing-Shijiazhuang Passenger Dedicated Line.

The Beijing underground cross-city railway, which was proposed as early as 1959 and connects Beijing Railway Station and Beijing West Railway Station, started construction in December 2005, and was completed and opened to traffic on 20 March 2015. The underground Diameter Line enables both Beijing Railway Station and Beijing West Railway Station to receive and dispatch passenger trains from the Beijing-Harbin Line and other directions. According to the railway development plan, the capacity of Beijing West Railway Station will continue to increase year by year. It is estimated that by 2020, the number of trains arriving and departing from Beijing West Railway Station will reach 137 pairs, including 79 pairs of high-speed trains.

== Services ==
=== China Railway ===
Beijing West 北京西

General information
- Other names: Beijing West
- Location: 118 Lianhuachi Donglu, Fengtai District, Beijing; China
- Operator: China Railway
- Lines: Beijing–Guangzhou Railway; Beijing–Kowloon Railway; Beijing–Shijiazhuang High-Speed Railway; Beijing–Xiong'an intercity railway Beijing Underground Cross City Railway; Sub-Central line (Beijing Suburban Railway)
- Platforms: 18
- Tracks: 20

Other information
- Station code: TMIS code: 21152; Telegram code: BXP; Pinyin code: BJX
- Classification: Top Class station

History
- Opened: 21 January 1996; 30 years ago

Services
Preceding station	China Railway High-speed	Following station
Terminus	Beijing–Shijiazhuang high-speed railway	Zhuozhou East towards Shijiazhuang
Terminus	Beijing–Xiong'an intercity railway	Beijing Daxing towards Xiong'an
Preceding station	China Railway	Following station
Terminus	Beijing–Nanning–Hanoi	Shijiazhuang towards Gia Lâm
Terminus	Beijing–Guangzhou railway	Houlücun towards Guangzhou
Terminus	Beijing–Kowloon railway	Guang'anmen towards Hung Hom
Terminus	Beijing underground cross-city railway	Beijing Terminus
Preceding station	Beijing Suburban Railway	Following station
Liangxiang Terminus	Sub-Central line	Beijing towards Qiaozhuang East
Location

Beijing West railway station is a terminal for both "traditional" and high-speed trains. It is the Beijing terminal for most trains leaving the city for destinations in western and southwestern China, including Xi'an, Chongqing, Chengdu, Lhasa and Urumqi. Major "traditional" rail lines beginning at this station include the Beijing-Guangzhou railway (via Wuhan) and the Beijing–Kowloon railway (via Nanchang and Shenzhen).

Beijing West is the terminal both for the Beijing–Kowloon through train and (since the opening of the Qingzang railway in 2006) for the Beijing-Lhasa trains.

Beijing West is the northern terminal of the Beijing–Guangzhou high-speed railway as of December 2012. High-speed trains leave the station for Guangzhou and Shenzhen, as well as various destinations on the connecting lines, such as Taiyuan and Xi'an. There are, however, plans to construct a new major railway terminal (the new Fengtai railway station) in the southwestern part of Beijing, and to eventually make it the terminal for the high-speed trains on the Beijing-Guangzhou line.

The Beijing underground cross-city railway connects Beijing West with Beijing railway station.

==== Destinations ====
Carriers	Destinations
CR Beijing	Baoji South, Changsha South, Changchun, Chengde, Chongqing, Dajian, Guangzhou South, Guiyang North, Handan, Handan East, Hengshui, Nanchang West, Nanning East, Qinhuangdao, Shenzhen, Shenzhen North, Shijiazhuang, Taiyuan South, Wuhan, Xi'an, Xi'an North, Xining, Yichang East, Yinchuan, Yuncheng North, Zhangjiakou South, Zhuhai
CR Chengdu	Chengdu West, Chengdu East, Chongqing North, Guiyang, Guiyang North, Panzhihua South
CR Guangzhou	Changsha South, Guangzhou, Hong Kong West Kowloon, Sanya, Shenzhen, Shenzhen North
CR Harbin	Harbin, Lhasa
CR Hohhot	Baotou, Dongsheng West, Guangzhou, Hohhot, Tianjin, Wuhai West
CR Kunming	Kunming
CR Lanzhou	Lanzhou, Yinchuan
CR Nanchang	Fuzhou, Ganzhou, Jinggangshan, Nanchang, Nanchang West, Shijiazhuang, Xiamen
CR Nanning	Guilin North, Nanning, Nanning East, Zhanjiang
CR Qingzang	Xining
CR Shanghai	Anqing, Fuyang, Huangshan, Nanjing, Shanghai
CR Shenyang	Changchun, Lhasa, Shenyang North
CR Taiyuan	Linfen West, Taiyuan South, Yongji North, Yuncheng North
CR Ürümqi	Ürümqi South
CR Wuhan	Enshi, Hankou, Shiyan, Wuchang, Wuhan, Yichang East, Zhoukou
CR Xi'an	Baoji, Baoji South, Hanzhong, Tianjin, Xi'an, Xi'an North
CR Zhengzhou	Changzhi North, Hankou, Luoyang, Nanyang, Xi'an North, Zhengzhou, Zhengzhou East

=== Beijing Subway ===
Beijingxi Zhan station (Beijing West Railway Station) 北京西站
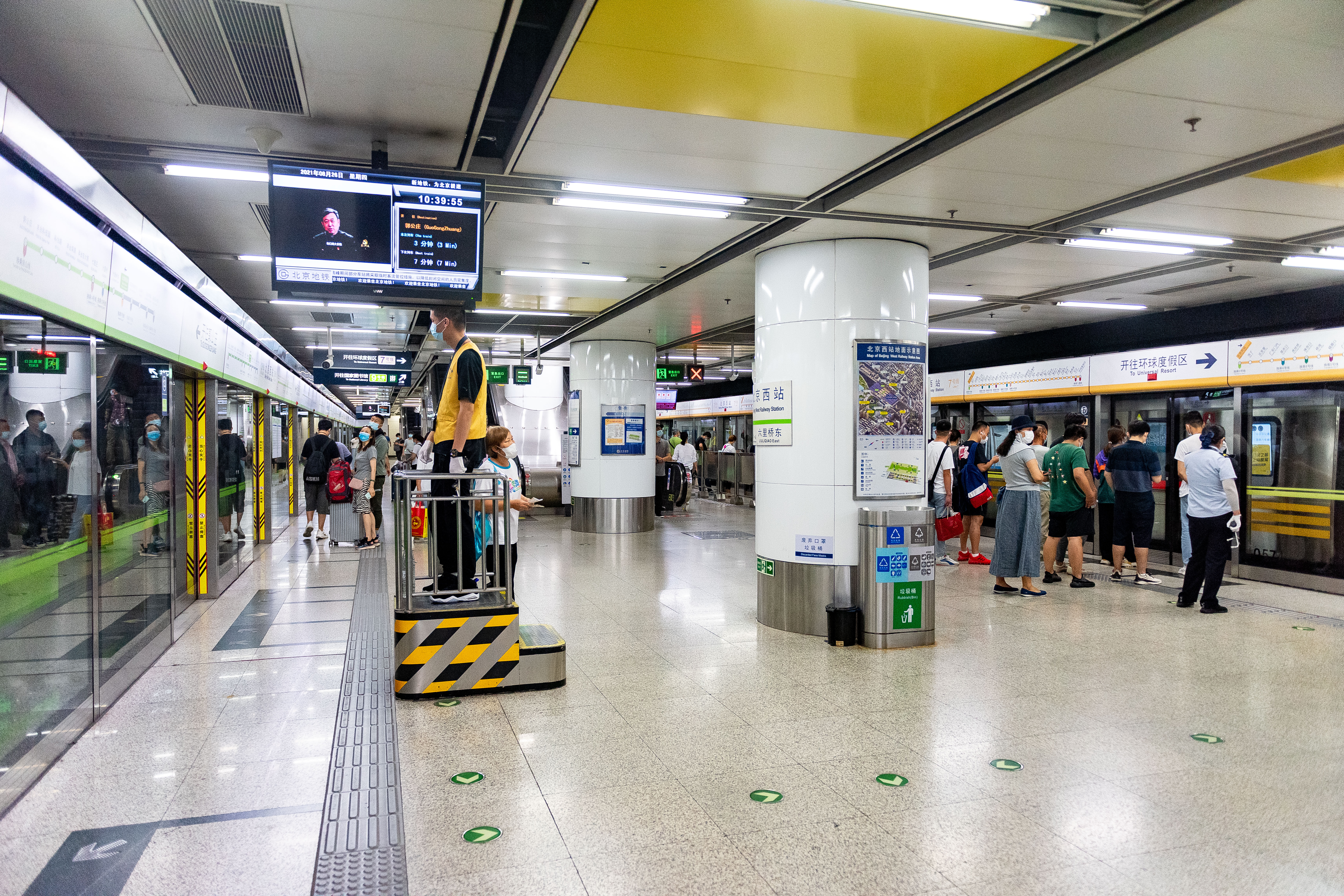
- Southbound/Eastbound platform

General information
- Operator: Beijing Mass Transit Railway Operation Corporation Limited
- Lines: Line 7; Line 9; Fangshan line (through service to Line 9)
- Platforms: 4 (2 island platforms)
- Tracks: 4

Construction
- Structure type: Underground
- Accessible: Yes

History
- Opened: 28 December 2014; 11 years ago (Line 7); 31 December 2011; 14 years ago (Line 9)

Services
Preceding station	Beijing Subway	Following station
Terminus	Line 7	Wanzi towards Universal Resort
Military Museum towards National Library	Line 9	Liuliqiaodong towards Guogongzhuang
Military Museum towards National Library	Fangshan line Through service (weekday peak only)	Liuliqiaodong towards Yancundong
Location

- This station is served by Line 7 and Line 9. Passengers are able to change between Line 7 and Line 9 using the cross-platform interchange method. The Subway concourse is on the Arrivals level, with all platforms a level further below. This station was the terminus of Line 9 until it was extended north to National Library on 30 December 2012.
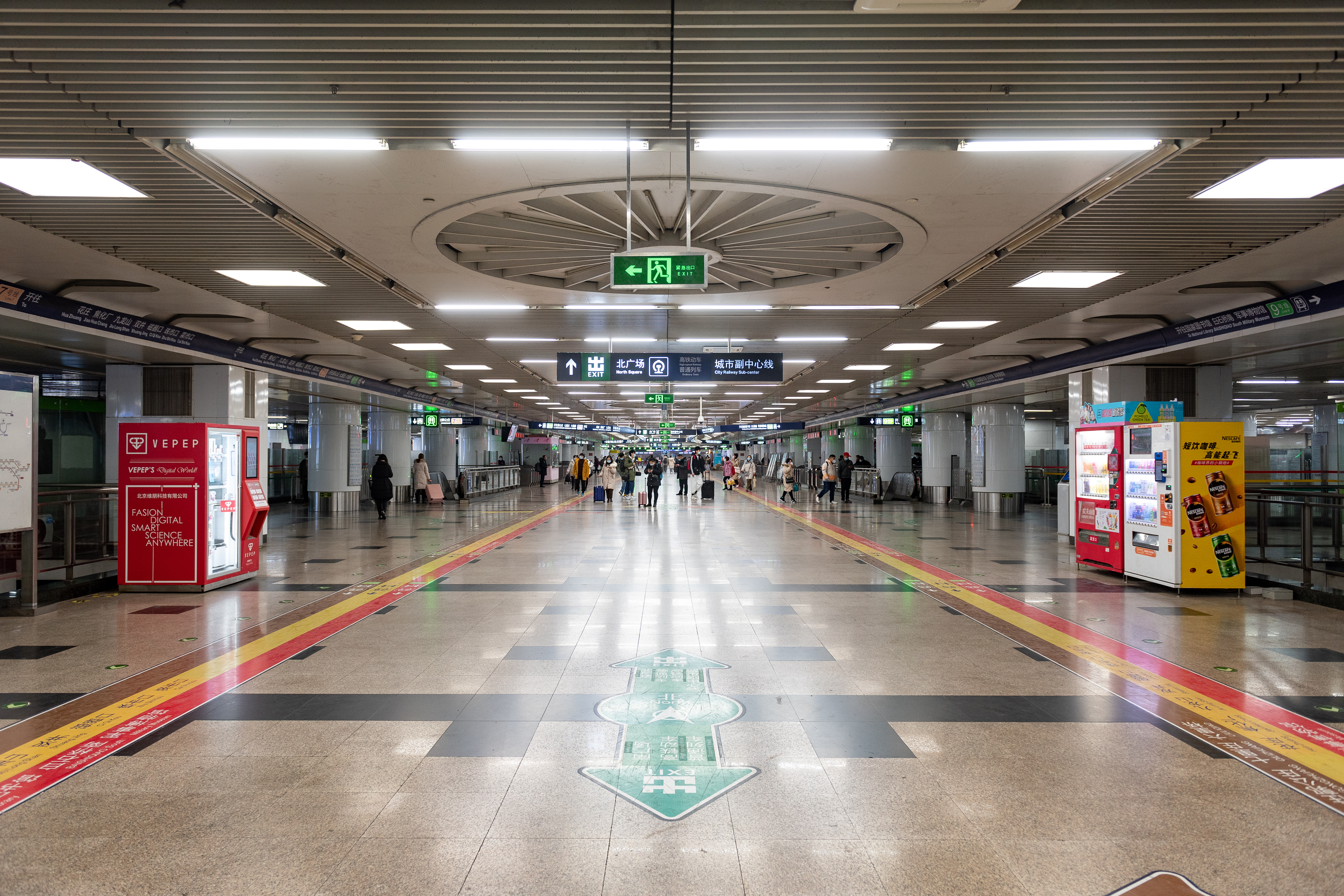
Concourse

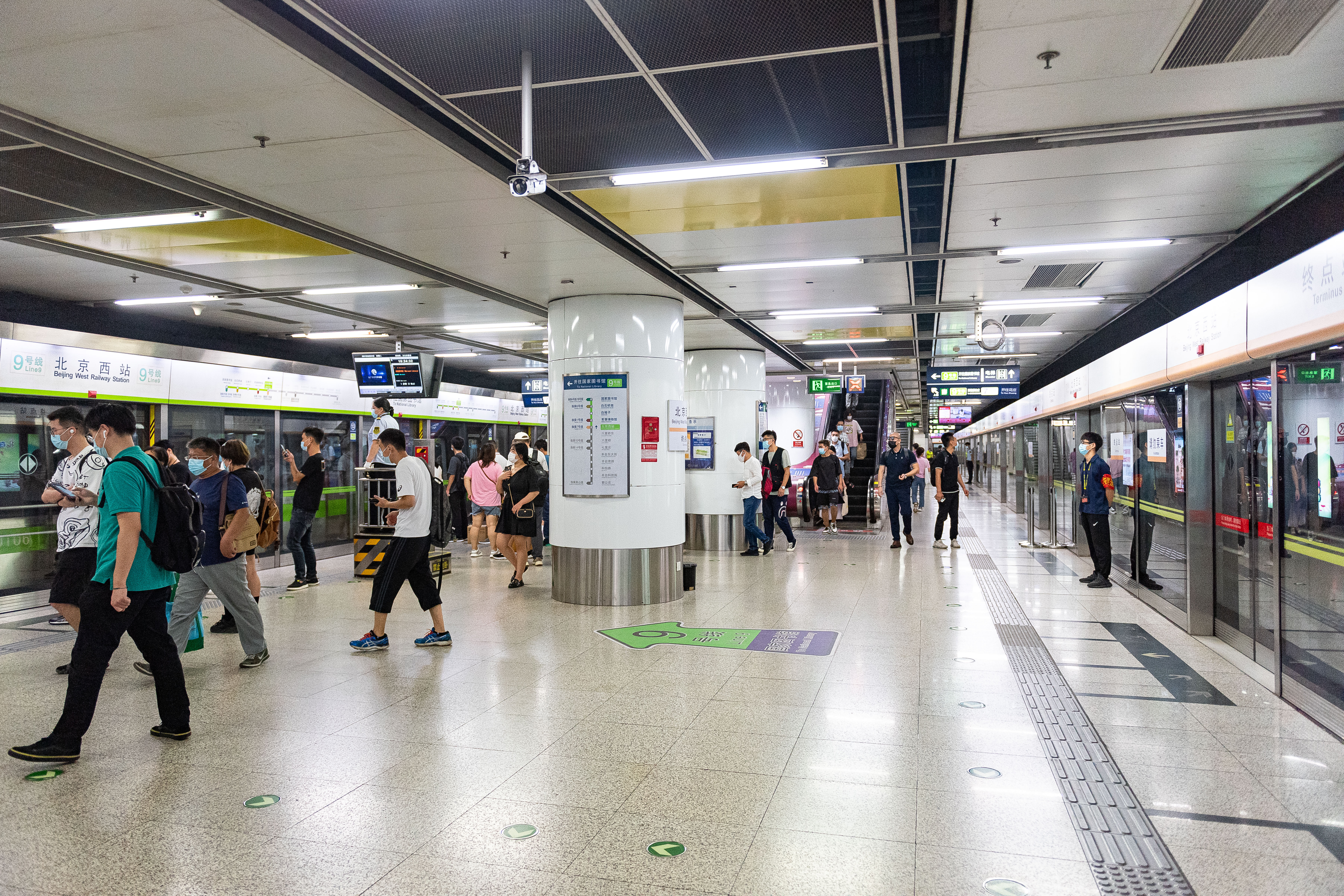
Northbound platform

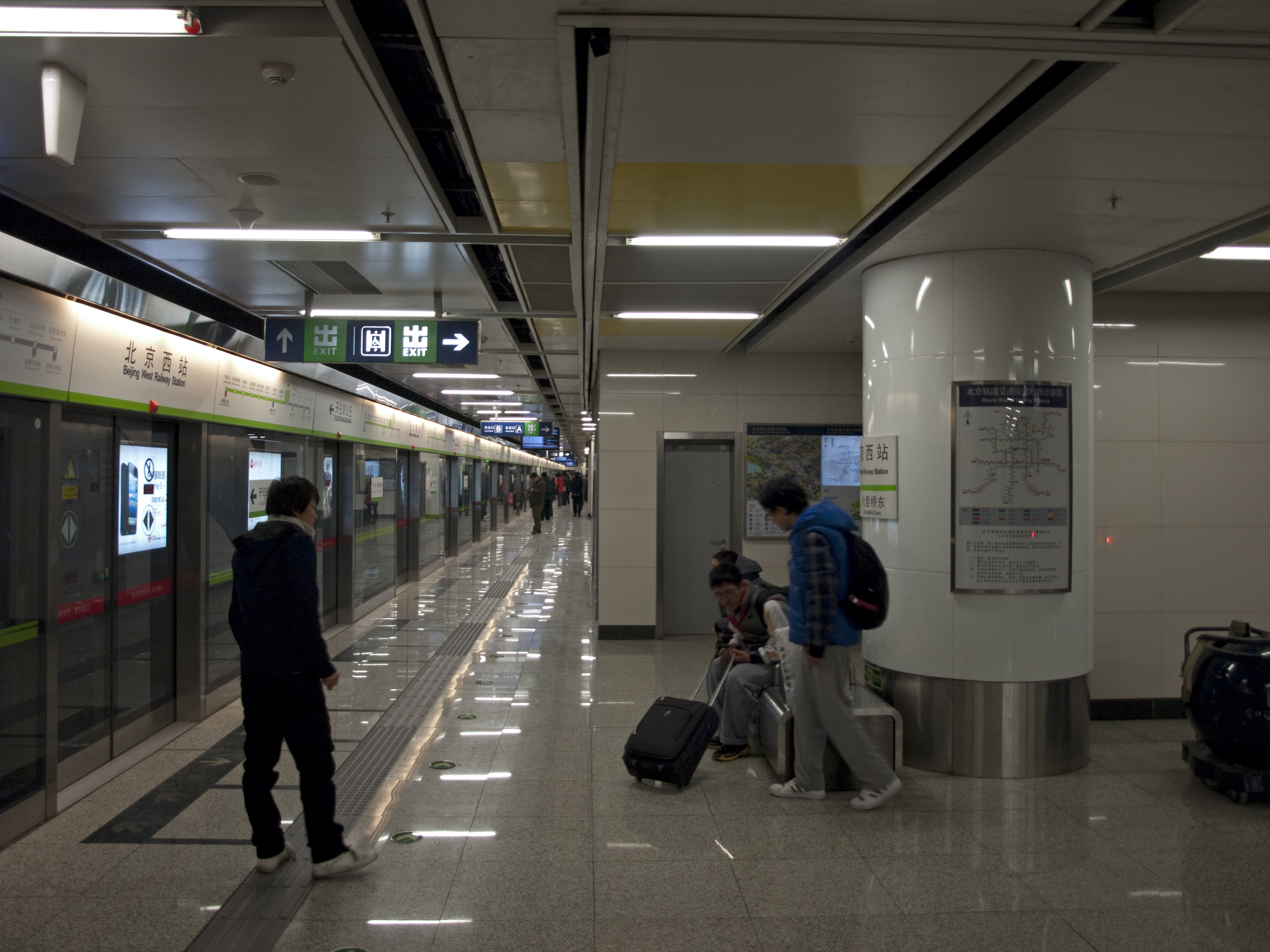
Platform before the opening of Line 7

=== Beijing Bus ===
- Beijing Bus stops:
  - **Beijing West Station** (北京西站): 9, **21**, 40, 47, 50, **52**, 54, **65**, 67, **83**, 89, **99**, 205, 209, 212, 213, 301, **319**, **320**, **373**, **374**, **387**, 414, **437**, 616, **623**, 661, 662, 663, **673**, 694, **695**, **741**, 840, 843, 845, 901, 特2, **特6**, **运通102**
  - **Beijing West Station South Square** (北京西站南广场): **53**, **72**, **109**, **122**, **309**, **349**, **410**, **616**, **820**, **890**, **941**, **982**, **993**,
- Beijing Airport Bus: **Route 7**

Bus route numbers in bold denotes terminus at the stop.

== Station layout ==
=== China Railway ===
Regular rail services leave from Platforms 1–11; HSR leaves from Platforms 12–18. A dedicated exit is used for passengers arriving on Platform 18.

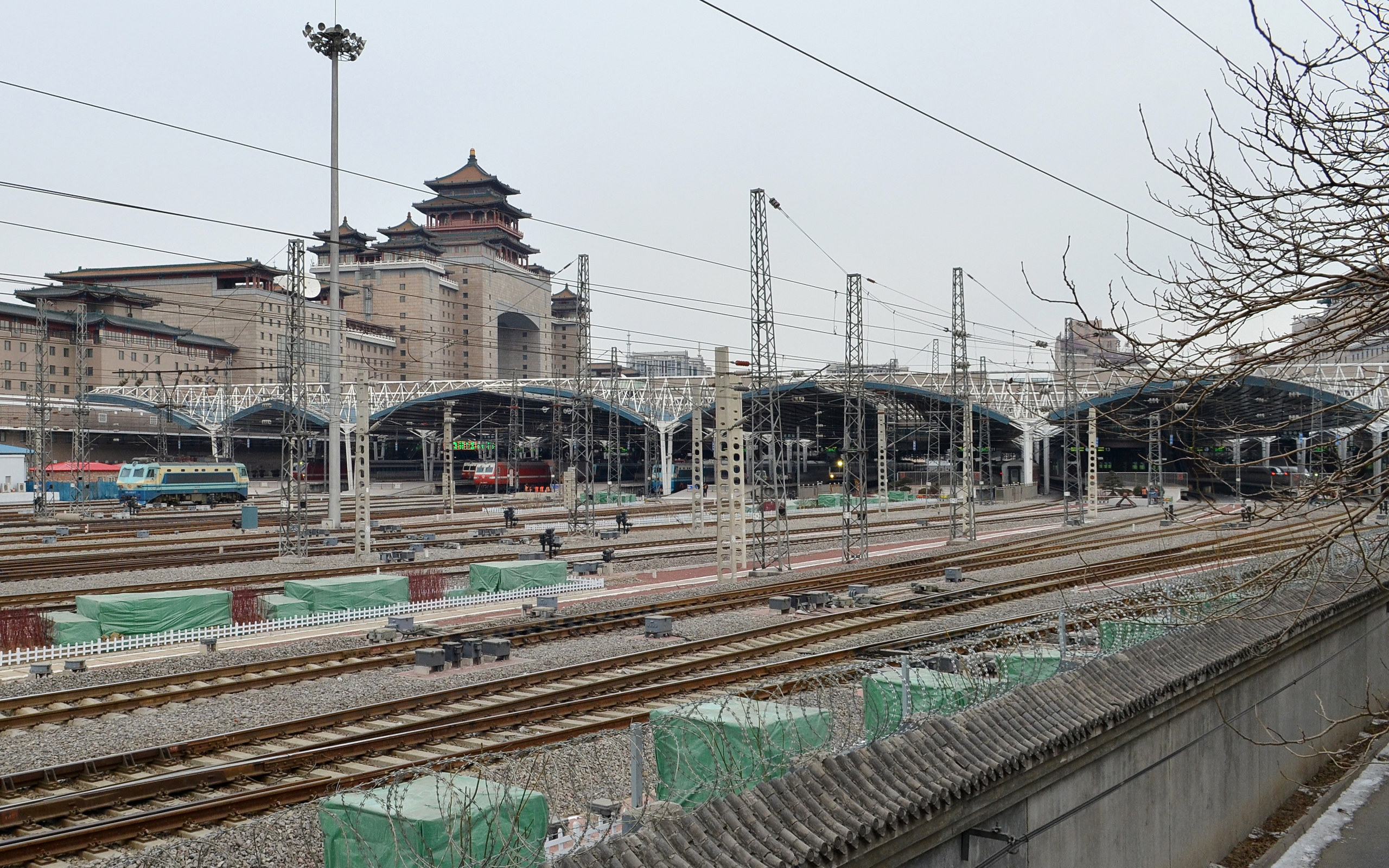
Beijing West railway station Platforms and Tracks

Beijing West railway station Platform 1

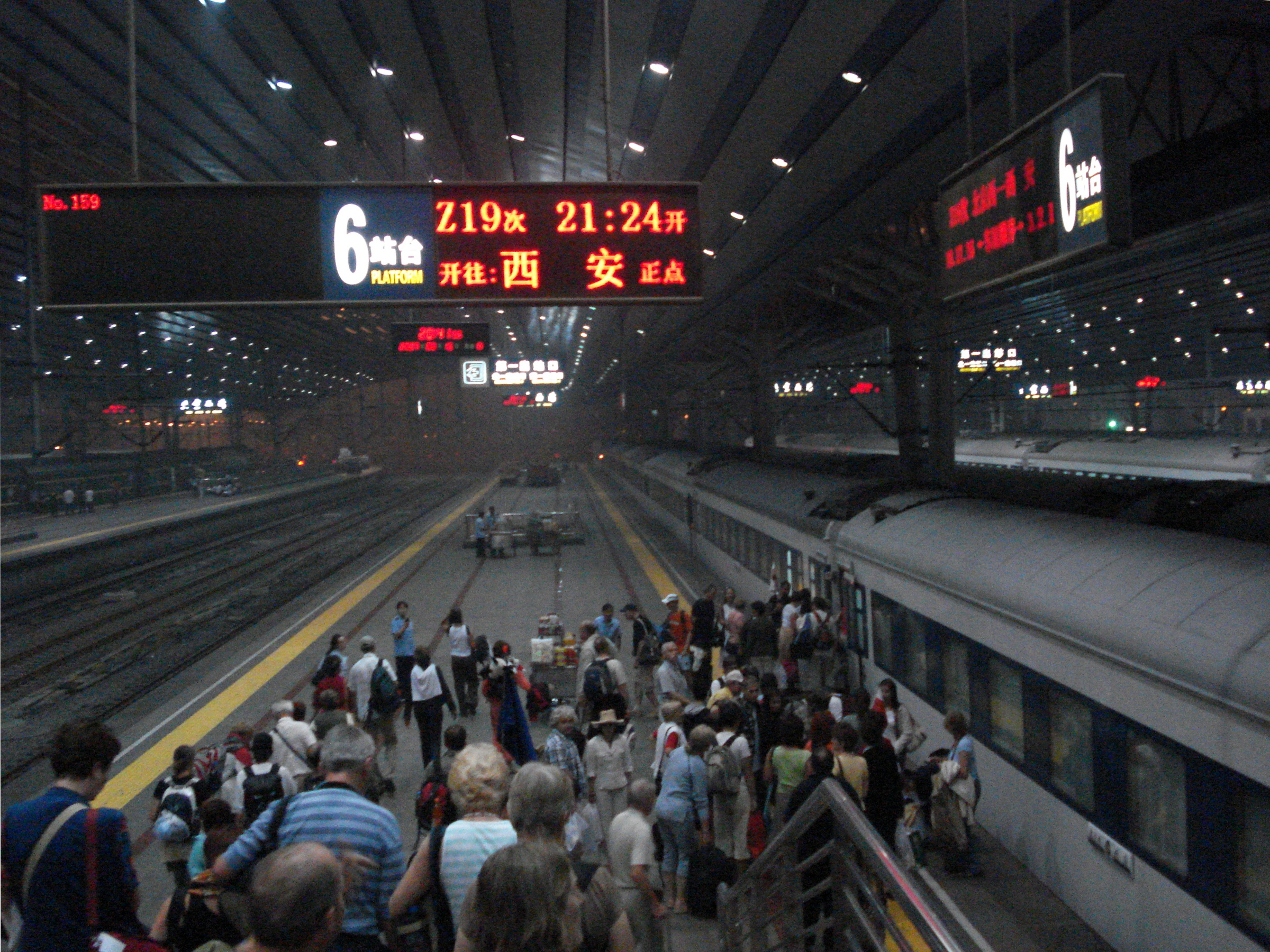
Beijing West railway station Platform 6

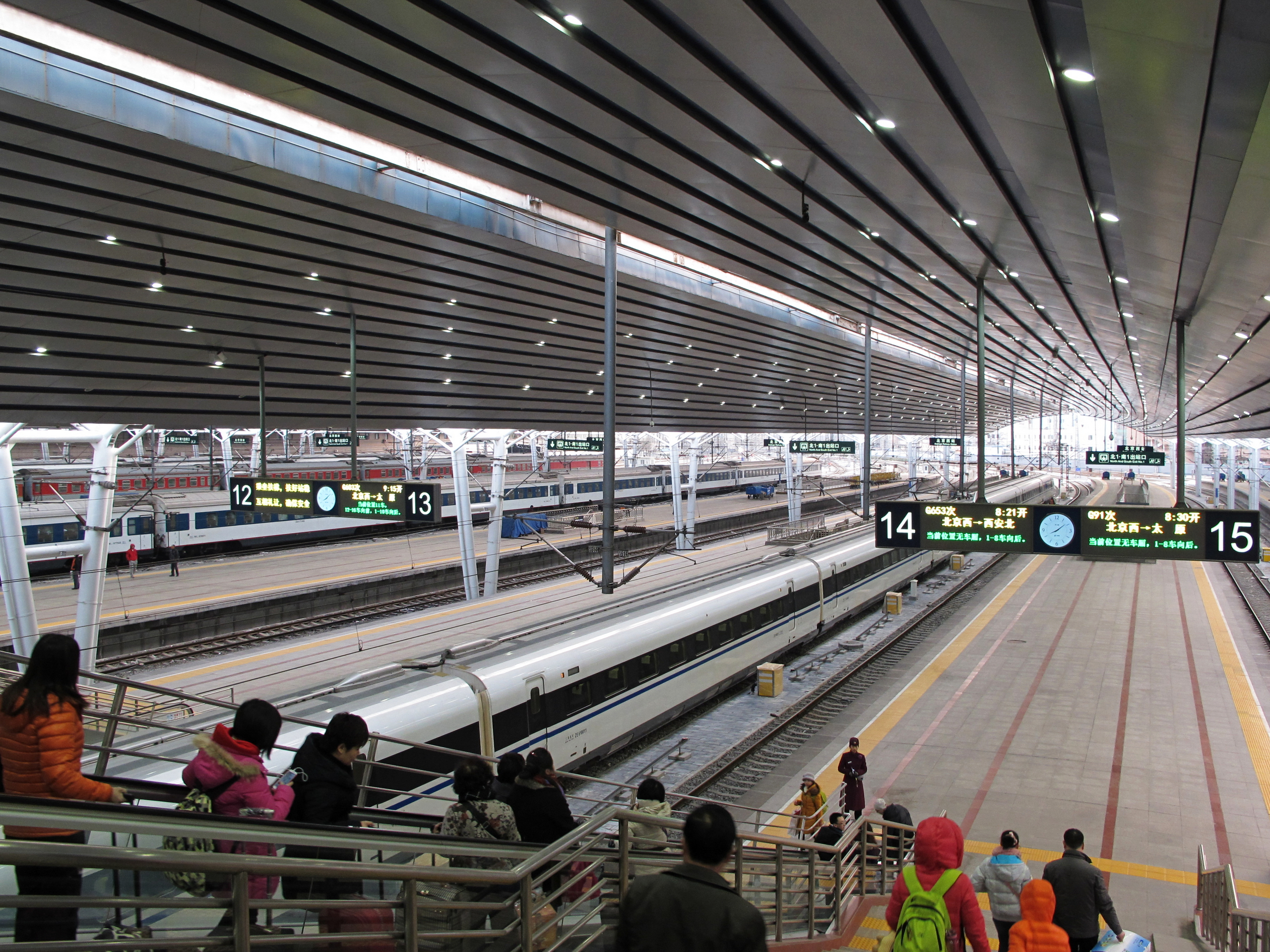
Beijing West railway station platform

North
Platform 1
Track 1
Track 2
Platform 2
Platform 3
Track 3
Track 4
Platform 4
Platform 5
Track 5
Track 6

←Beijing–Guangzhou Railway —— Beijing–Kowloon Railway→

Track 7
Platform 6
Platform 7
Track 8
Track 9
Platform 8
Platform 9
Track 10
Track 11 (Xichang Railway, Beijing-Kowloon Railway)
Track 12 (South of this track Beijing–Guangzhou–Shenzhen–Hong Kong High-Speed Railway)
Platform 10
Platform 11
Track 13
Track 14
Platform 12
Platform 13
Track 15
Track 16
Platform 14
Platform 15
Track 17
Track 18
Platform 16
Platform 17
Track 19
Track 20
South
Platform 18

All passengers will leave Beijing West from the Level 2 Departures Hall. A VIP lounge is available for Business Class passengers travelling HSR. Ticket counters and machines are available beside the main entrances.

=== Beijing Subway ===
The station has dual-island platforms with a cross platform interchange between lines 7 and 9. On one side, originating line 7 trains interchange with southbound line 9 trains towards Guogongzhuang, whilst on the other, terminating line 7 trains interchange with northbound line 9 trains towards National Library.
