= Linheli Subdistrict =

Linheli Subdistrict 临河里街道
- Subdistrict
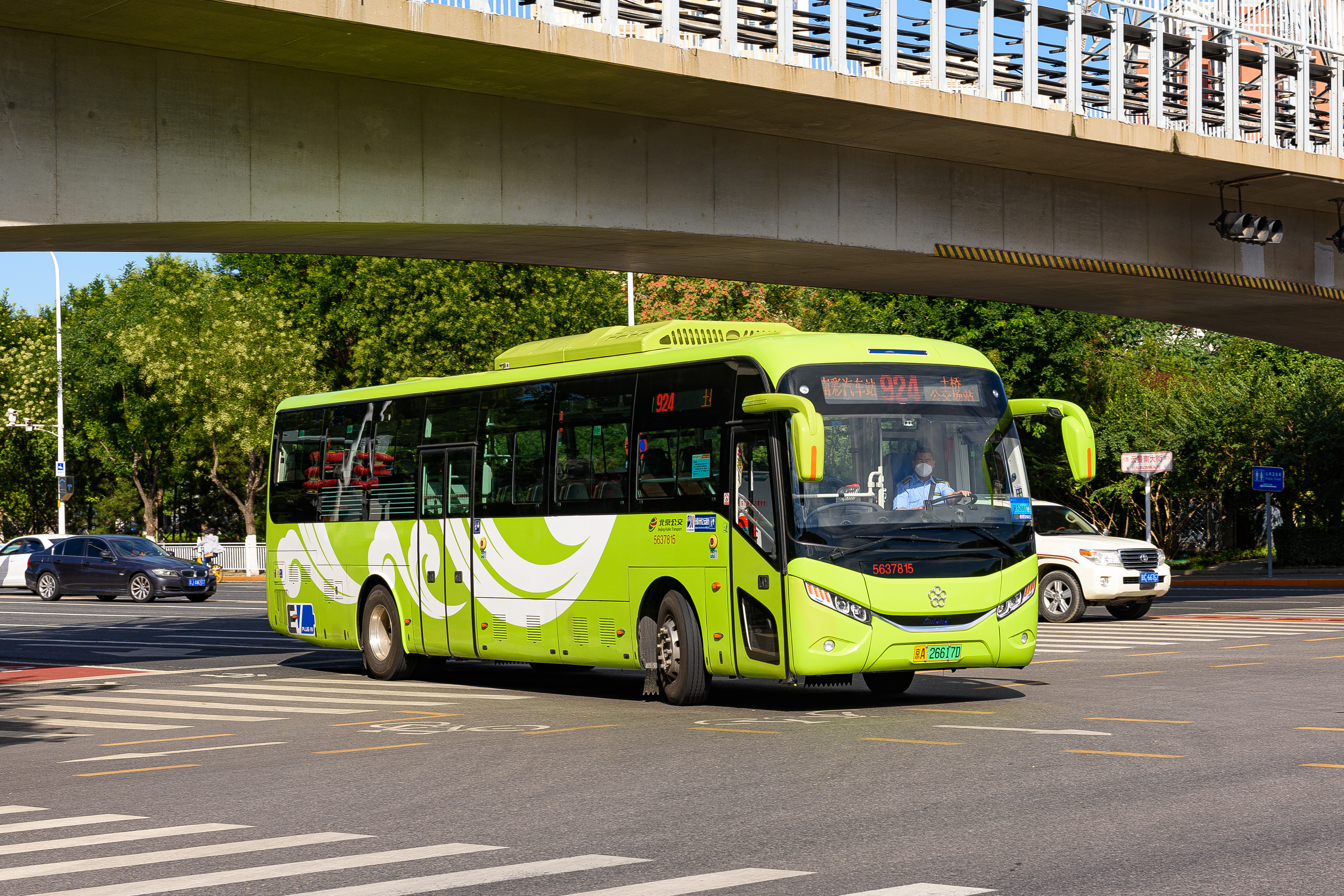
- Tongzhou Xiaojie Qiaodong southwest of the subdistirct, 2022

- Location within Beijing Location within China
- Coordinates: 39°52′36″N 116°38′23″E
- Country: China
- Municipality: Beijing
- District: Tongzhou
- Village-level Divisions: 10 communities
- Time zone: UTC+8 (China Standard)
- Postal code: 101121
- Area code: 010

Linheli Subdistrict (Chinese: 临河里街道; pinyin: Línhélǐ Jiēdào) is a subdistrict located on the northwest of Tongzhou District, Beijing. It borders Yuqiao Subdistrict in its north, Yongshun and Zhangjiawan Towns in its east, Liyuan Town in its south, and Jiukeshu Subdistrict in its west.

The subdistrict was formally created on 2020.

== Administrative divisions ==
As of 2021, the subdistrict consisted of 10 residential communities:

Administrative division code	Subdivision names	Name transliteration
110112011001	土桥	Tuqiao
110112011002	潞阳桥	Luyangqiao
110112011003	净水园	Jingshuiyuan
110112011004	花石苑	Huashiyuan
110112011005	运河滨江	Yunhe Binjiang
110112011006	铭悦园	Mingyueyuan
110112011007	砖厂南里	Zhuanchang Nanli
110112011008	临河里	Linheli
110112011009	玫瑰园	Meiguiyuan
110112011010	裕馨	Yuxin

== See also ==
- List of township-level divisions of Beijing
