= Xiji =

Xiji may refer to:

- Wang Xiji (1921–2026), a Chinese scientist
- Xiji County, a county in Ningxia, China
- Xiji, Beijing, a town in Beijing, China
