= Luyi Subdistrict =

Subdistrict located in Beijing, China

Luyi Subdistrict 潞邑街道
- Subdistrict
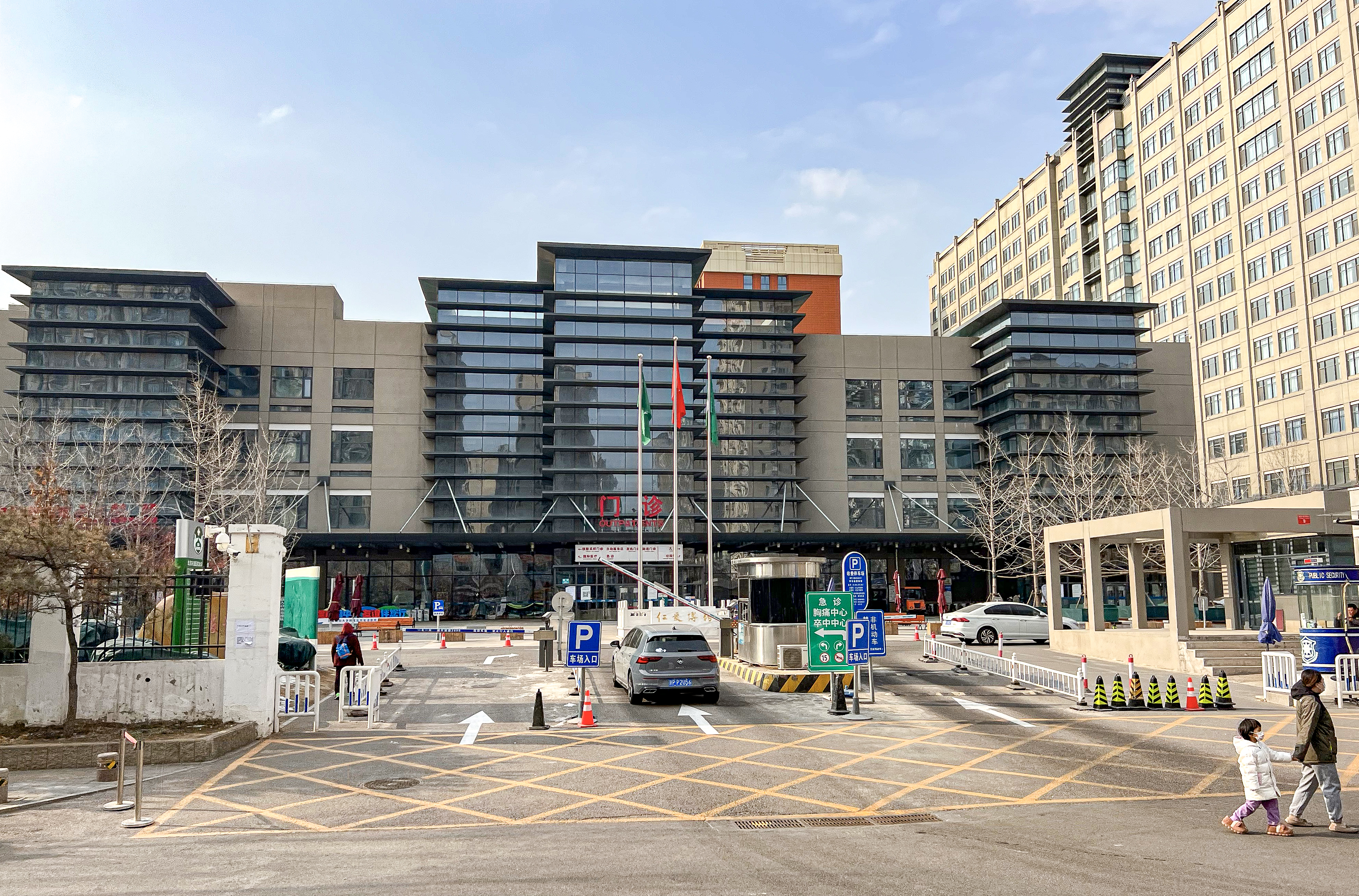
- Beijing Friendship Hospital Tongzhou quarter within the subdistrict, 2024

- Location within Beijing Location within China
- Coordinates: 39°56′03″N 116°37′34″E
- Country: China
- Municipality: Beijing
- District: Tongzhou
- Village-level Divisions: 9 communities
- Time zone: UTC+8 (China Standard)
- Postal code: 101100
- Area code: 010

Luyi Subdistrict (Chinese: 潞邑街道; pinyin: Lùyì Jiēdào) is a subdistrict situated on northwestern part of Tongzhou District, Beijing. It shares border with Yongshun Town in the northwest, Songzhuang Town in the northeast, Lucheng Town in the east, Xinhua and Tongyun Subdistrict in the south.

The subdistrict was created in 2020.

== Administrative divisions ==
As of 2021, the subdistrict oversaw 9 residential communities:

Administrative division code	Subdivision names	Name transliteration
110112013001	潞邑	Luyi
110112013002	潞苑南里	Luyuan Nanli
110112013003	龙旺庄	Longwangzhuang
110112013004	东潞苑西区	Dongluyuan Xiqu
110112013005	运通园	Yuntongyuan
110112013006	潞苑嘉园	Luyuan Jiayuan
110112013007	通瑞嘉苑	Tongrui Jiayuan
110112013008	潞苑北里	Luyuan Beili
110112013009	潞苑南里西	Luyuan Nanlixi

== See also ==
- List of township-level divisions of Beijing
