= Zhongcang Subdistrict =

Zhongcang Subdistrict 中仓街道
- Subdistrict
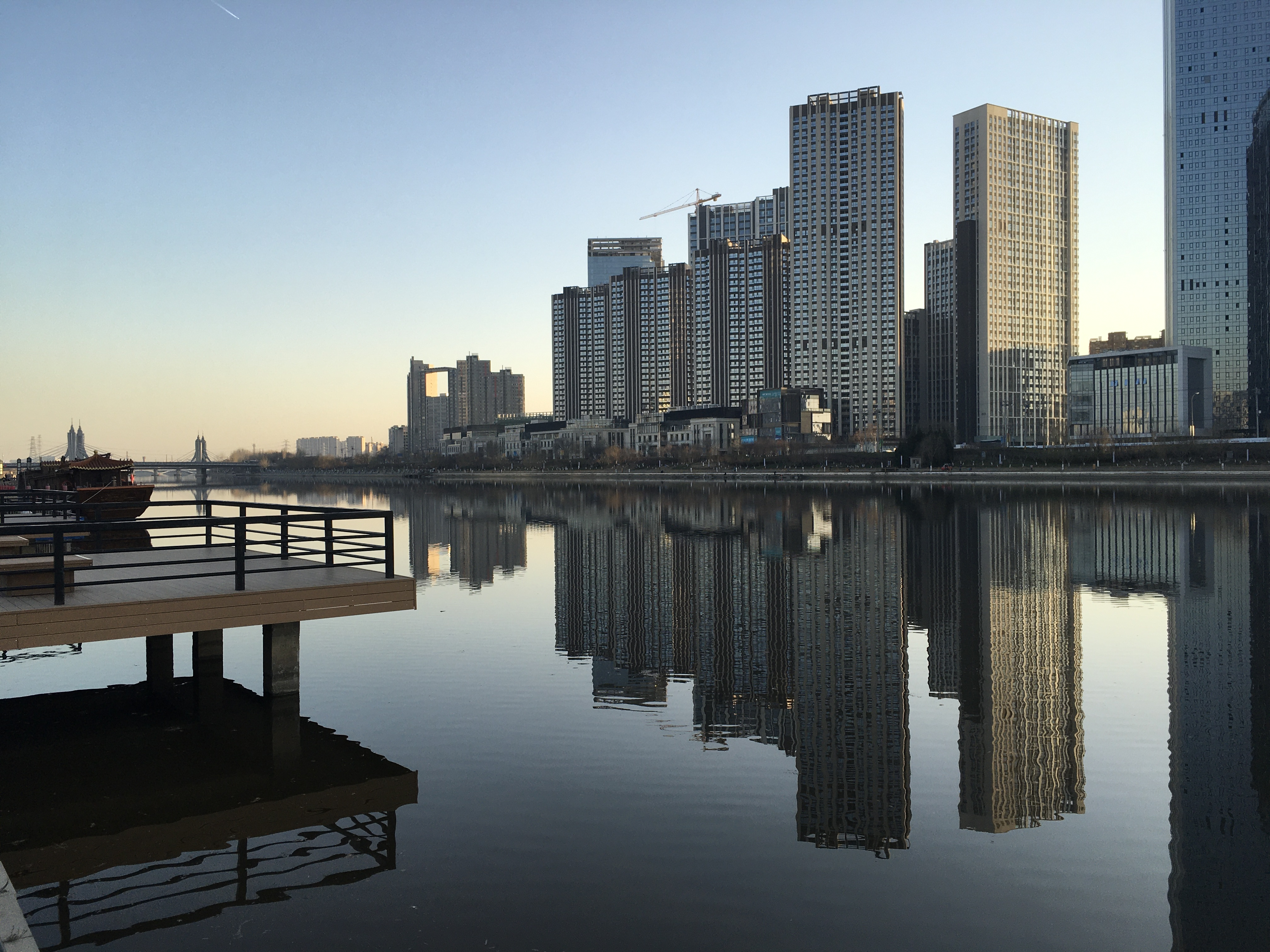
- Jinghang Grand Canal that passes through the subdistrict, 2021

- Location within Beijing Location within China
- Coordinates: 39°54′10″N 116°39′27″E
- Country: China
- Municipality: Beijing
- District: Tongzhou
- Village-level Divisions: 13 communities

Area
  - Total: 3.44 km^{2} (1.33 sq mi)
- Elevation: 32 m (105 ft)

Population (2020)
  - Total: 66,803
  - Density: 19,400/km^{2} (50,300/sq mi)
- Time zone: UTC+8 (China Standard)
- Postal code: 101100
- Area code: 010

Zhongcang Subdistrict (simplified Chinese: 中仓街道; traditional Chinese: 中倉街道; pinyin: Zhōngcāng Jiēdào) is a subdistrict and the seat of Tongzhou District, Beijing. It borders Xinhua Subdistrict to its north, Tongyun Subdistrict to its east, Yuqian Subdistrict to its south, and Beiyuan Subdistrict to its west. As of 2020, it had 66,903 people residing under its administration.

During the Ming and Qing dynasties, this region had an imperial granary for keeping foods transported through the Grand Canal, and as a result the region began to be known as Zhongcang (Chinese: 中仓; lit. 'Central Granary').

== History ==
In December 1948, four townships of Tongxian were separated and merged to form Tongzhou City. It was then changed to a county-administered town in 1950. In 1997, Tongzhou Town was dissolved, and the former Dongcheng and Nancheng Subdistricts were combined to form Zhongcang Subdistrict.

== Administrative divisions ==
In 2021, the subdistrict was made up of 13 residential communities:

Administrative division code	Subdivision names	Name transliteration
110112001006	悟仙观	Wuxianguan
110112001011	白将军	Baijiangjun
110112001012	东里	Dongli
110112001016	西营	Xiying
110112001017	中仓	Zhongcang
110112001021	小园	Xiaoyuan
110112001023	四员厅	Siyuanting
110112001024	西上园	Xishangyuan
110112001025	新华园	Xinhuayuan
110112001026	莲花寺	Lianhuasi
110112001027	中上园	Zhongshangyuan
110112001029	滨河	Binhe
110112001403	商务公寓工作站	Shangwu Gongyu Gongzuozhan

== Gallery ==
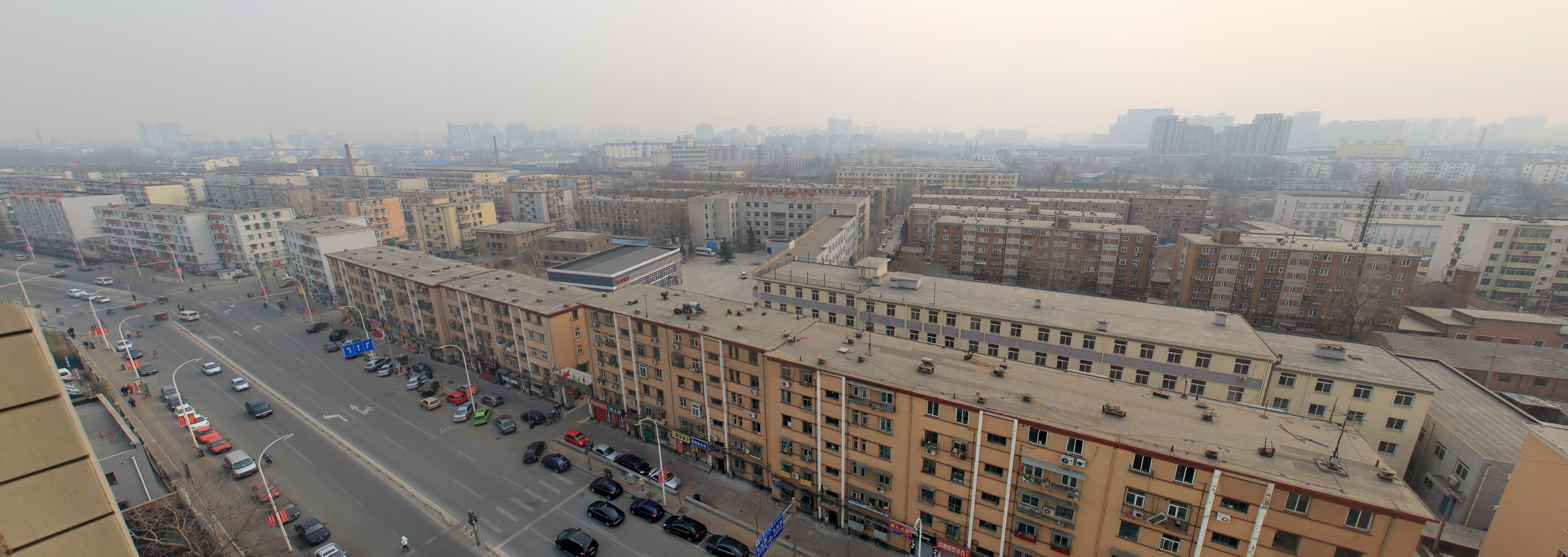
View of the urban area taken from Luhe Hospital, 2012

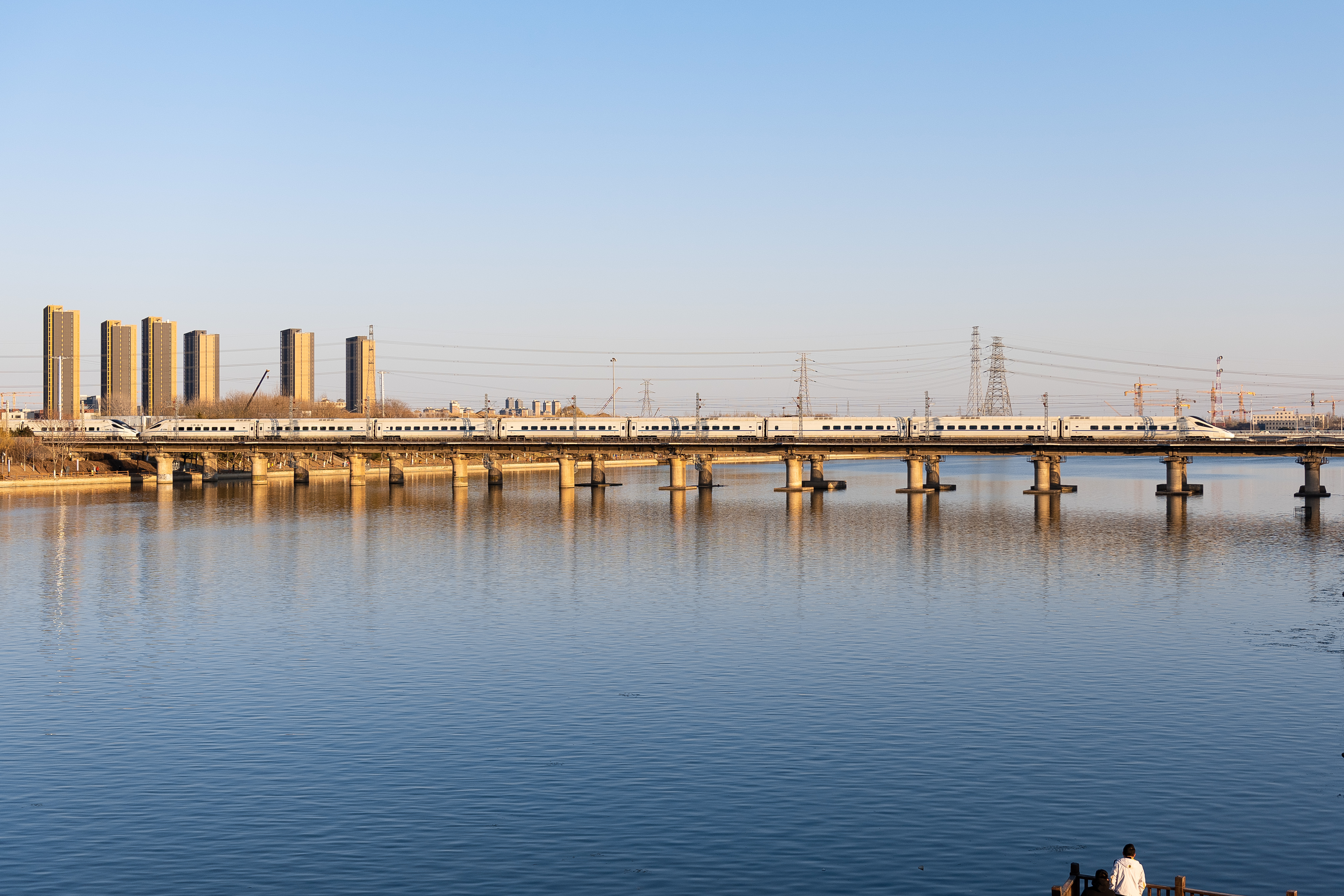
Grand Canal Bridge on southeast of the subdistrict, 2021

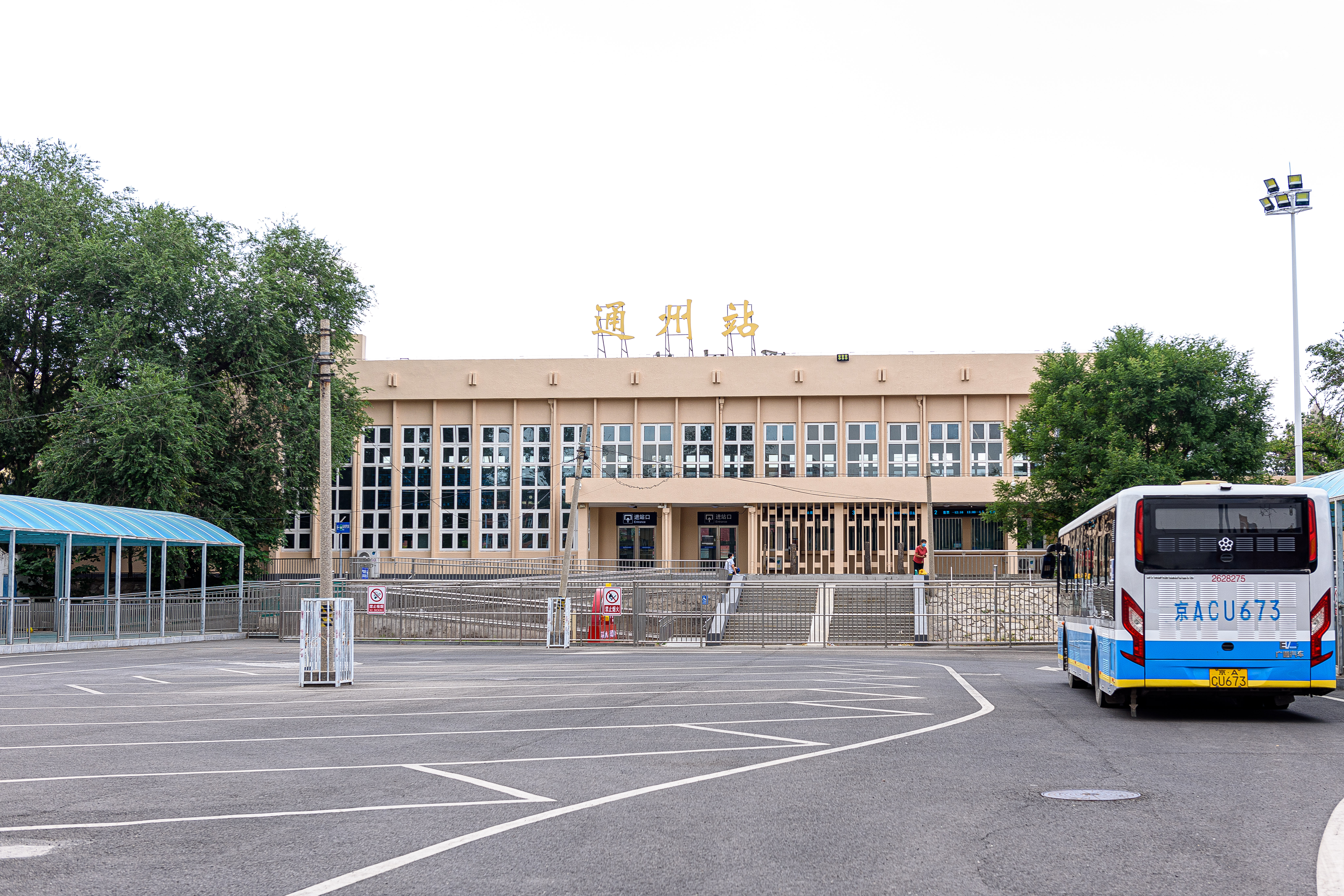
Tongzhou Railway Station, 2022

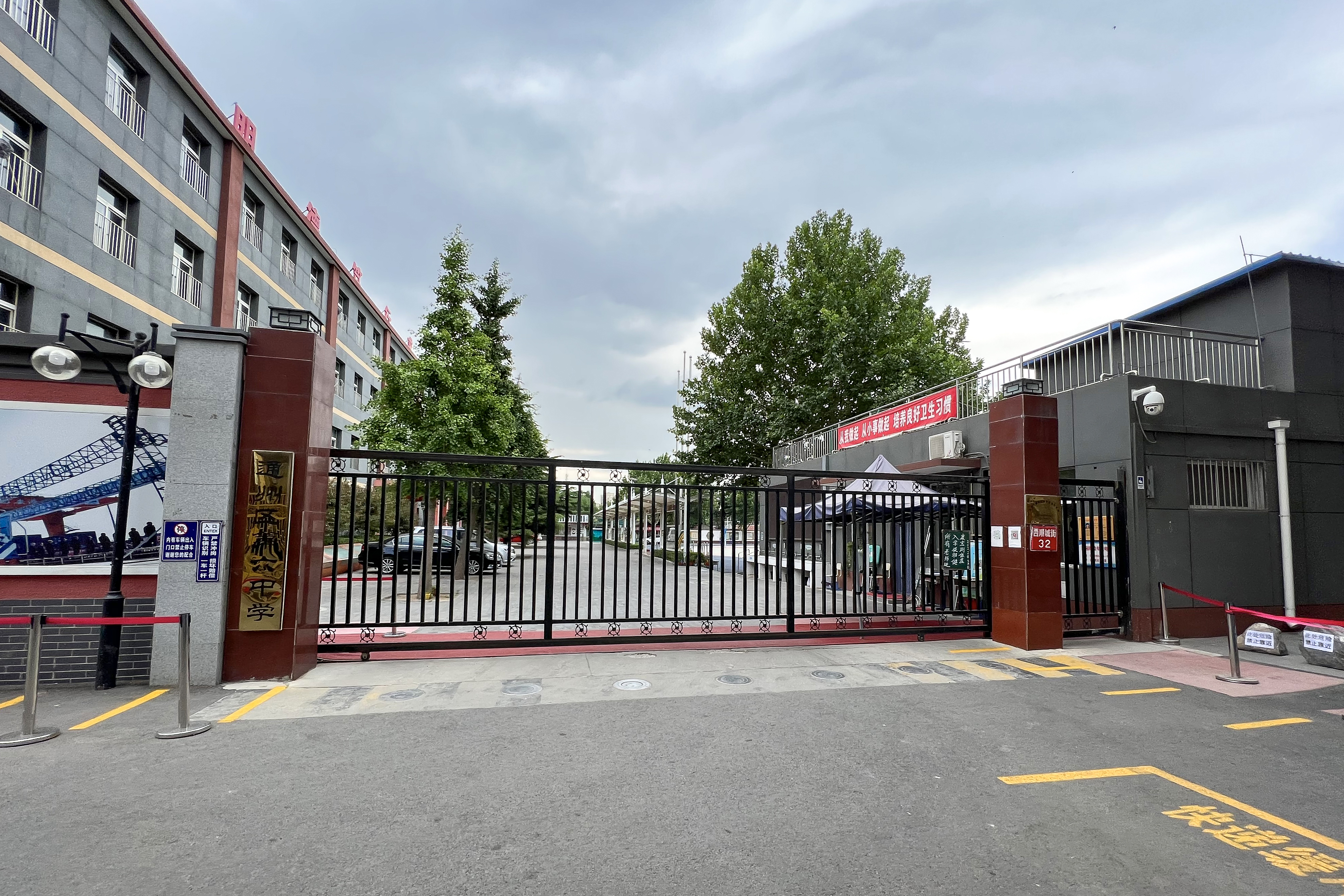
Tongzhou No.6 High School, 2022

== See also ==
- List of township-level divisions of Beijing
