= Yangzhuang Subdistrict, Beijing =

Yangzhuang Subdistrict 杨庄街道
- Subdistrict
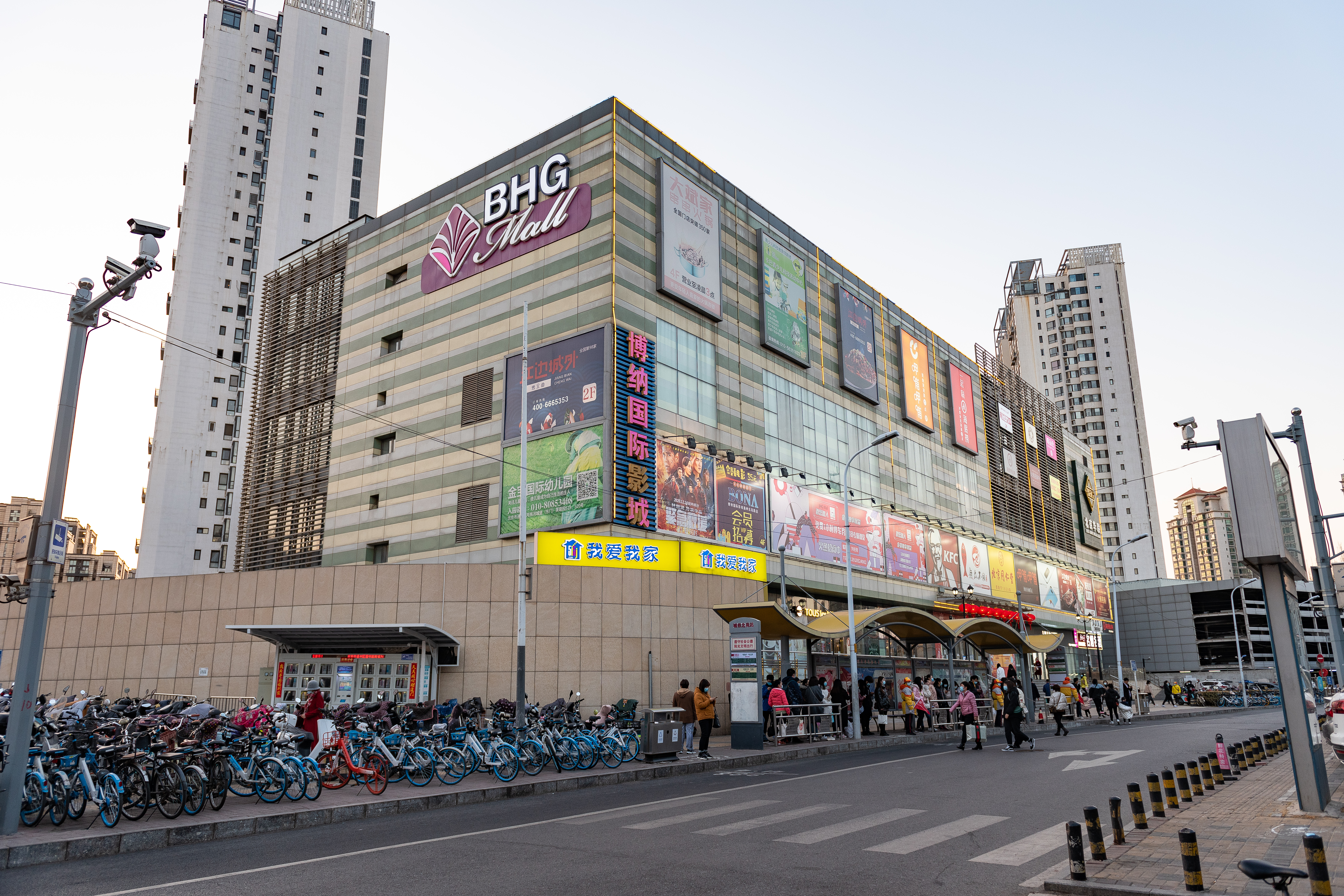
- BHG Mall west of Tongzhou Beiyuan Station, 2021

- Location within Beijing Location within China
- Coordinates: 39°53′37″N 116°37′34″E
- Country: China
- Municipality: Beijing
- District: Tongzhou
- Village-level Divisions: 16 communities
- Time zone: UTC+8 (China Standard)
- Postal code: 101199
- Area code: 010

Yangzhuang Subdistrict (Chinese: 杨庄街道; pinyin: Yángzhuāng Jiēdào) is a subdistrict located on northwestern side of Tongzhou District, Beijing. It shares border with Beiyuan Subdistrict to the north, Jiukeshu Subdistrict to the east, Liyuan Town to the south, and Heizhuanghu Township to the west.

The subdistrict was created in 2020.

== Administrative divisions ==
As of 2021, Yangzhuang Subdistrict was divided into 16 communities:

Administrative division code	Subdivision names	Name transliteration
110112012001	京贸国际	Jingmao Guoji
110112012002	新华联家园北区	Xinhualian Jiayuan Beiqu
110112012003	五里店	Wulidian
110112012004	锦园	Jinyuan
110112012005	广通	Guangtong
110112012006	新北苑	Xinbeiyuan
110112012007	天时名苑	Tianshi Mingyuan
110112012008	杨庄南里南区	Yangzhuang Nanli Nanqu
110112012009	杨庄南里西区	Yangzhuang Nanli Xiqu
110112012010	杨庄通广嘉园	Yangzhuang Tongguang Jiayuan
110112012011	世纪星城兴业园	Shiji Xingcheng Xingyeyuan
110112012012	世纪星城西	Shiji Xingchengxi
110112012013	靓景明居	Liangjing Mingju
110112012014	新华联家园南区	Xinhualian Jiayuan Nanqu
110112012015	京贸南区	Jingmao Nanqu
110112012016	怡乐园	Yileyuan

== Gallery ==
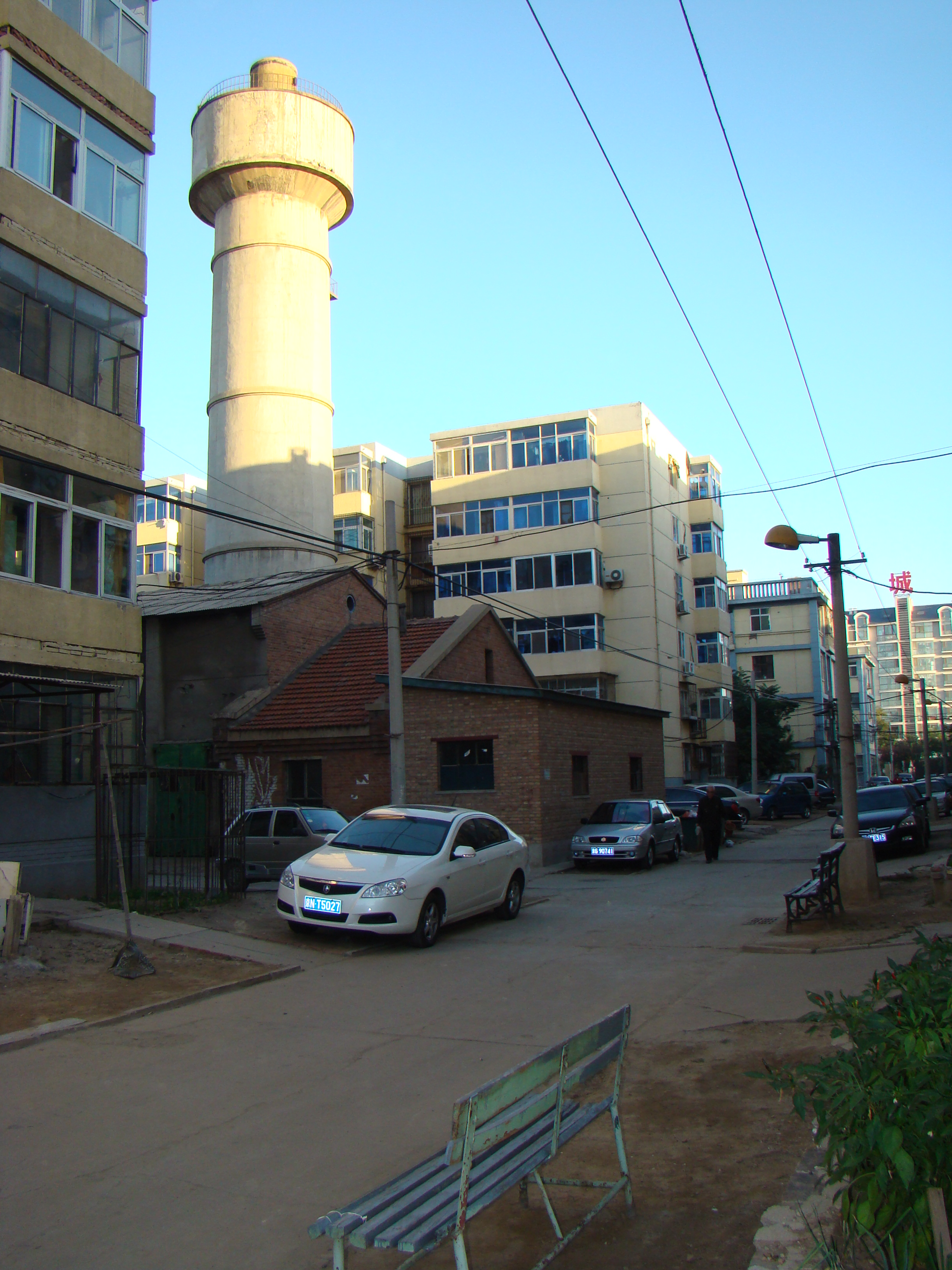
Yileyuan Community, 2009

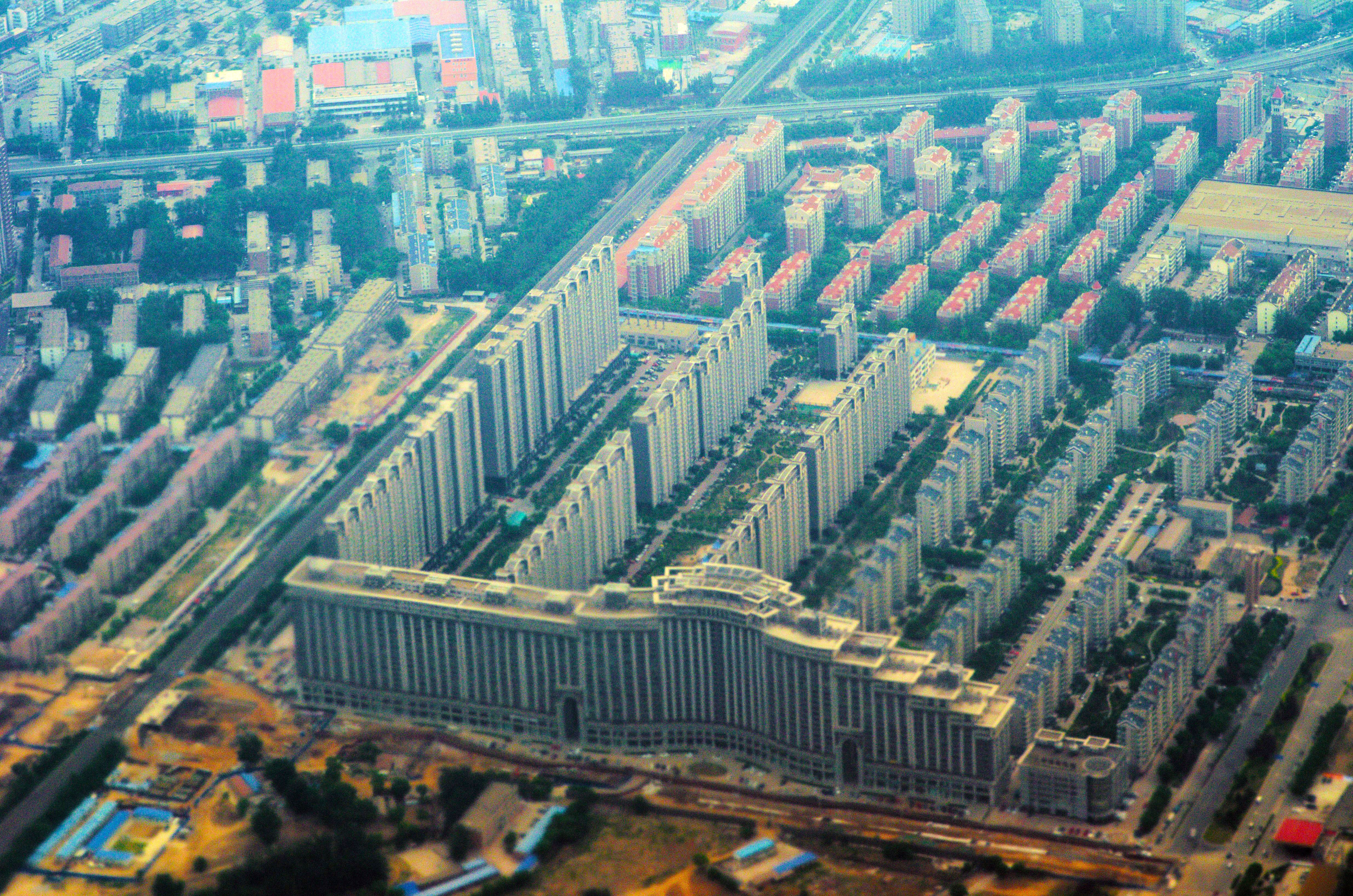
Aerial view of Shiji Xincheng, 2013

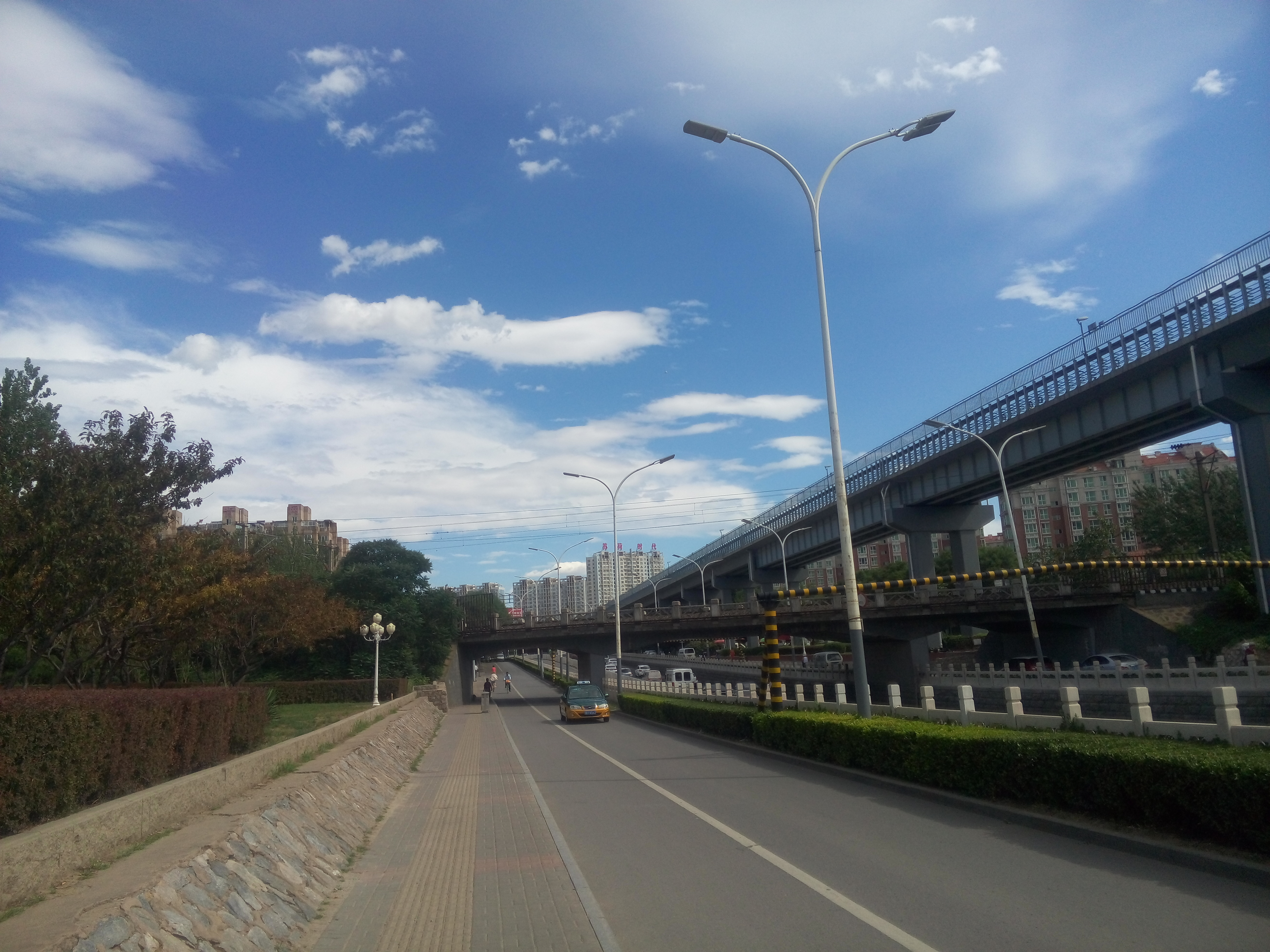
Beiyuan South Road, 2015

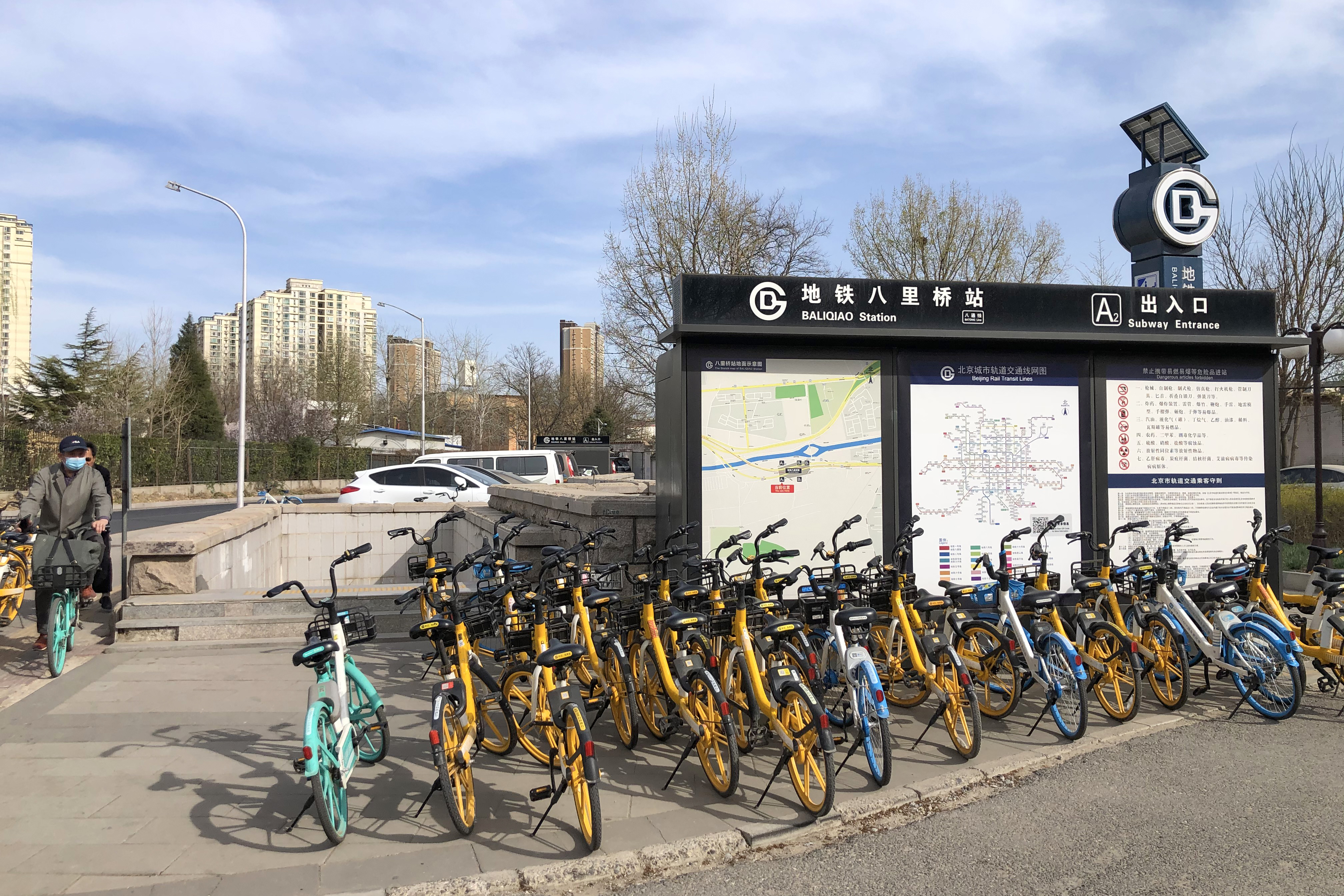
Exit of Baliqiao Station, 2021

== See also ==
- List of township-level divisions of Beijing
