= Xiji, Beijing =

Xiji Town 西集镇
- Town
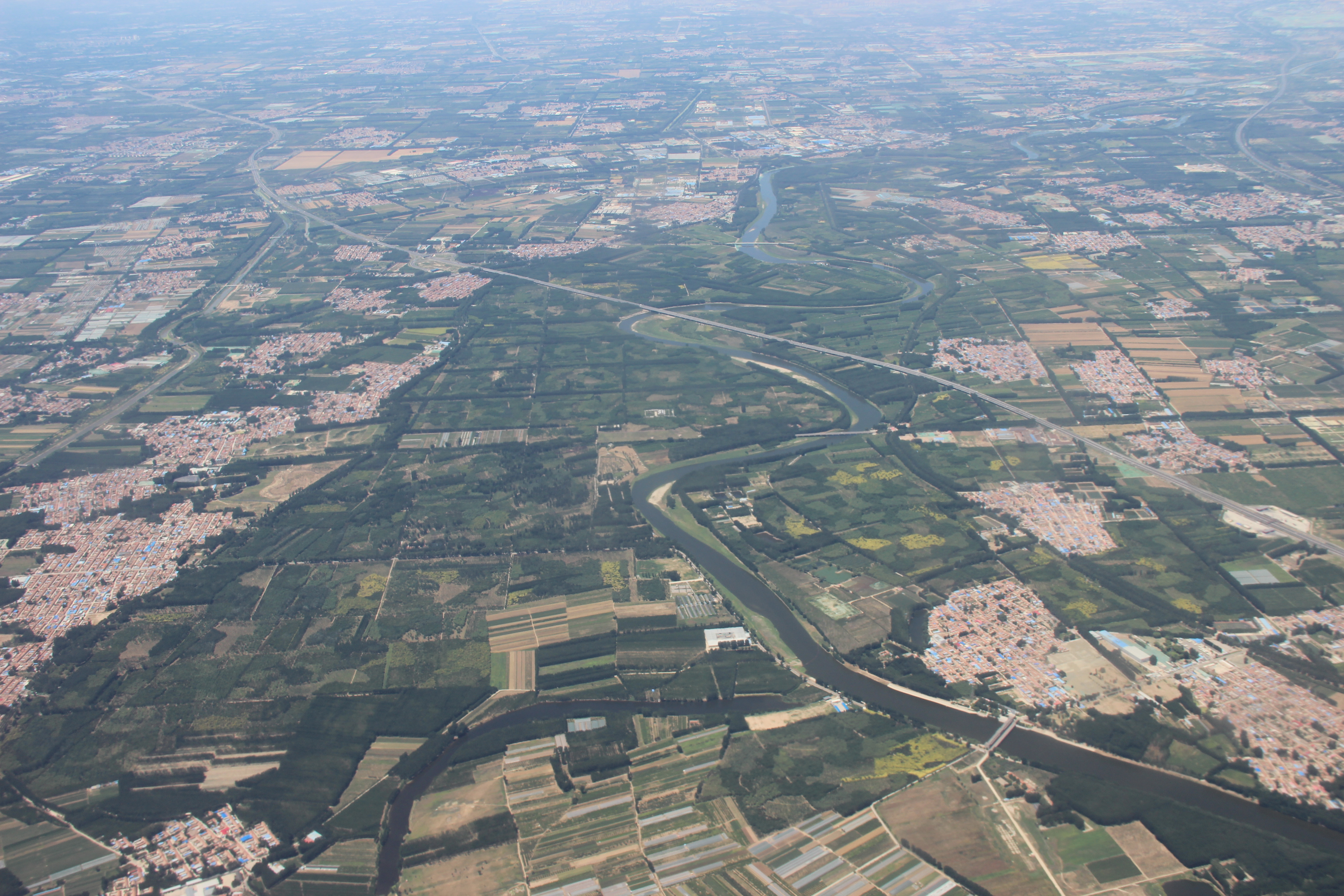
- Aerial view of Northern Canal and Xiji Town

- Location within Beijing Location within China
- Coordinates: 39°48′58″N 116°52′32″E
- Country: China
- Municipality: Beijing
- District: Tongzhou
- Village-level Divisions: 57 villages

Area
  - Total: 91.31 km^{2} (35.25 sq mi)

Population (2020)
  - Total: 46,678
  - Density: 511.2/km^{2} (1,324/sq mi)
- Time zone: UTC+8 (China Standard)
- Postal code: 101106
- Area code: 010

Xiji Town (Chinese: 西集镇; pinyin: Xījí Zhèn) is a town located in eastern part of Tongzhou District, Beijing, China. It borders Lucheng and Qigezhuang Towns to the north, Jiangxintun Town to the east, Huoxian Town to the south, and Zhangjiawan Town to the west. Its population was 46,678 as of 2020.

The name Xiji (Chinese: 西集; lit. 'West Market') refers to the local market during the Qing dynasty.

== History ==
Timeline of Xiji Town
Year	Status	Under
1936 – 1948	Xiji Township; Langfu Township	3rd Policing District of Tong County
1948 – 1956	Xiji Township Langfu Township	Tong County
1956 – 1958	Xiji Township; Dahuidian Township; Shangpo Township; Langfu Township	Tong County
1958 – 1965	Xiji People's Commune	Tong County
1965 – 1983	Xiji People's Commune (Incorporated Houzhaifu Commune in 1965); Langfu People's Commune (Incorporated Duliuke Commune in 1965)	Tong County
1983 – 1990	Xiji Township; Langfu Township	Tong County
1990 – 1997	Xiji Town; Langfu Town	Tong County
1997 – 2001	Xiji Town; Langfu Town	Tongzhou District
2001–present	Xiji Town	Tongzhou District

== Administration divisions ==
At the end of 2021, Xiji Town consisted of 57 villages:

Administrative division code	Subdivision names	Name transliteration
110112110201	西集	Xiji
110112110202	于辛庄	Yuxinzhuang
110112110203	协各庄	Xiegezhuang
110112110204	侯各庄	Hougezhuang
110112110205	胡庄	Huzhuang
110112110206	赵庄	Zhaozhuang
110112110207	武辛庄	Wuxinzhuang
110112110208	车屯	Chetun
110112110209	前东仪	Qiandongyi
110112110210	史东仪	Shidongyi
110112110211	侯东仪村	Houdongyi Cun
110112110212	黄东仪村	Huangdongyi Cun
110112110213	尹家河村	Yinjiahe Cun
110112110214	林屯村	Lintun Cun
110112110215	王上村	Wangshang Cun
110112110216	岳上村	Yueshang Cun
110112110217	石上村	Shishang Cun
110112110218	曹刘各庄	Caoliugezhuang
110112110219	东辛庄村	Dongxinzhuang Cun
110112110220	后寨府村	Houzhaifu Cun
110112110221	小灰店村	Xiaohuidian Cun
110112110222	大灰店村	Dahuidian Cun
110112110223	大沙务村	Dashawu Cun
110112110224	小沙务村	Xiaoshawu Cun
110112110225	南小庄村	Nanxiaozhuang Cun
110112110226	安辛庄村	Anxinzhuang Cun
110112110227	肖家林村	Xiaojialin Cun
110112110228	前寨府村	Qianzhaifu Cun
110112110229	桥上村	Qiaoshang Cun
110112110230	杜店村	Dudian Cun
110112110231	牛牧屯村	Niumutun Cun
110112110232	上坡村	Shangpo Cun
110112110233	和合站村	Hehezhan Cun
110112110234	吕家湾村	Lüjiawan Cun
110112110235	杨家洼	Yangjiawa Cun
110112110236	辛集村	Xinji Cun
110112110237	郎东	Langding
110112110238	郎西	Langxi
110112110239	马坊	Mafang
110112110240	小辛庄	Xiaoxinzhuang
110112110241	任辛庄村	Renxinzhuang
110112110242	沙古堆	Shagudui
110112110243	望君疃	Wangjuntuan
110112110244	杜柳棵	Duliuke
110112110245	太平庄	Taipingzhuang
110112110246	供给店	Gongjidian
110112110247	儒林	Rulin
110112110248	小屯	Xiaotun
110112110249	张各庄	Zhanggezhuang
110112110250	金各庄	Jingezhuang
110112110251	老庄户	Laozhuanghu
110112110252	何各庄村	Hegezhuang Cun
110112110253	冯各庄村	Fengezhuang Cun
110112110254	金坨	Jintuo
110112110255	王庄村	Wangzhuang Cun
110112110256	耿楼村	Genglou Cun
110112110257	陈桁	Chenheng

== See also ==
- List of township-level divisions of Beijing
