= Tongzhou, Beijing =

Tongzhou 通州区 Tungchow
- District
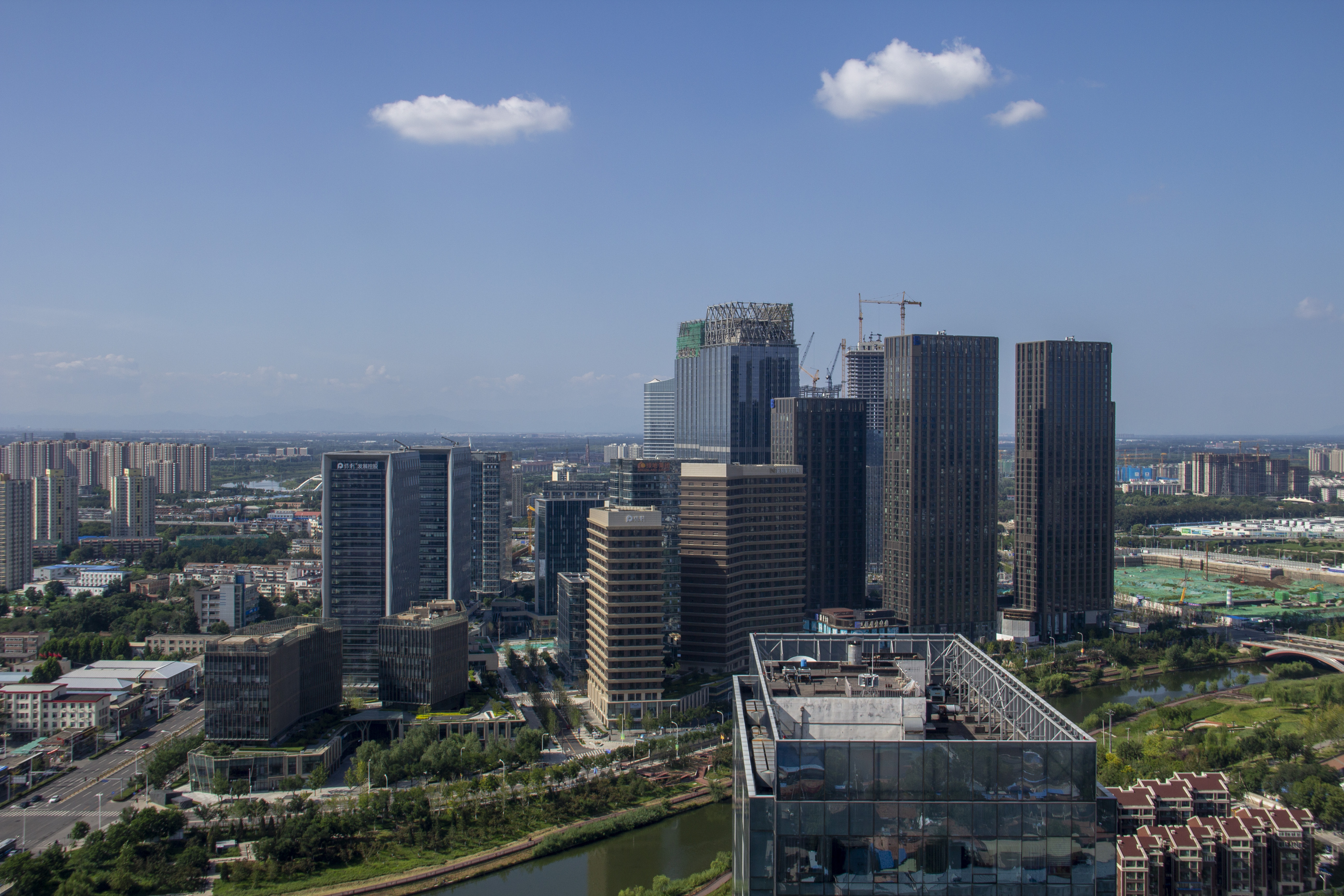
- Canal Business District in 2021

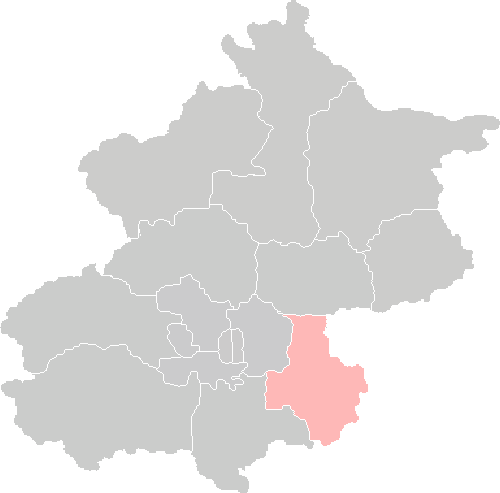
- Location of Tongzhou District in Beijing
- Coordinates: 39°54′36″N 116°39′23″E
- Country: China
- Municipality: Beijing
- Township-level divisions: 4 subdistricts 10 towns 1 ethnic township
- District seat: Zhongcang Subdistrict

Area
  - Total: 906 km^{2} (350 sq mi)
- Elevation: 32 m (105 ft)

Population (2020)
  - Total: 1,840,295
  - Density: 2,030/km^{2} (5,260/sq mi)
- Time zone: UTC+8 (China Standard)
- Postal code: 101149
- Area code: 0010
- Website: bjtzh.gov.cn/

Tongzhou
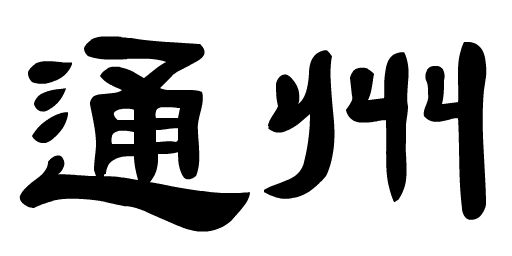
- "Tongzhou", as written in Chinese
- Chinese: 通州
- Postal: Tungchow
Transcriptions
Standard Mandarin
- Hanyu Pinyin: Tōngzhōu
- Wade–Giles: T'ung^{1}-chou^{1}

Tongxian (Tong County)
- Simplified Chinese: 通县
- Traditional Chinese: 通縣
- Postal: Tungchow
Transcriptions
Standard Mandarin
- Hanyu Pinyin: Tōngxiàn
- Wade–Giles: T'ung^{1}-hsien^{4}

Tongzhou (Note: Chinese: 通州区 / 通州區; pinyin: Tōngzhōu Qū; Wade–Giles: T'ung^{1}chou^{1} Ch'ü^{1}, alternate spellings Tungchow Tungchou (T'ung-chou), or Tong County during 1914–1997) (Chinese: 通州; pinyin: Tōngzhōu), historically romanized as Tong-Choo-Foo in 18th-century British accounts, is a district of Beijing. It is located in southeast Beijing and considered the eastern gateway to the nation's capital. Downtown Tongzhou itself lies around 20 km (12 mi) east of central Beijing, at the northern end of the Grand Canal (on the junction between the Tonghui Canal and the Northern Canal) and at the easternmost end of Chang'an Avenue. The entire district covers an area of 906 km^{2} (350 sq mi), or 6% of Beijing's total area. It had a population of 673,952 at the 2000 Census, and has seen significant growth and development since then, growing to a population of 1,184,000 at the 2010 Census and 1,840,295 at the 2020 census. The district is subdivided into four subdistricts, ten towns, and one ethnic township.

== History ==
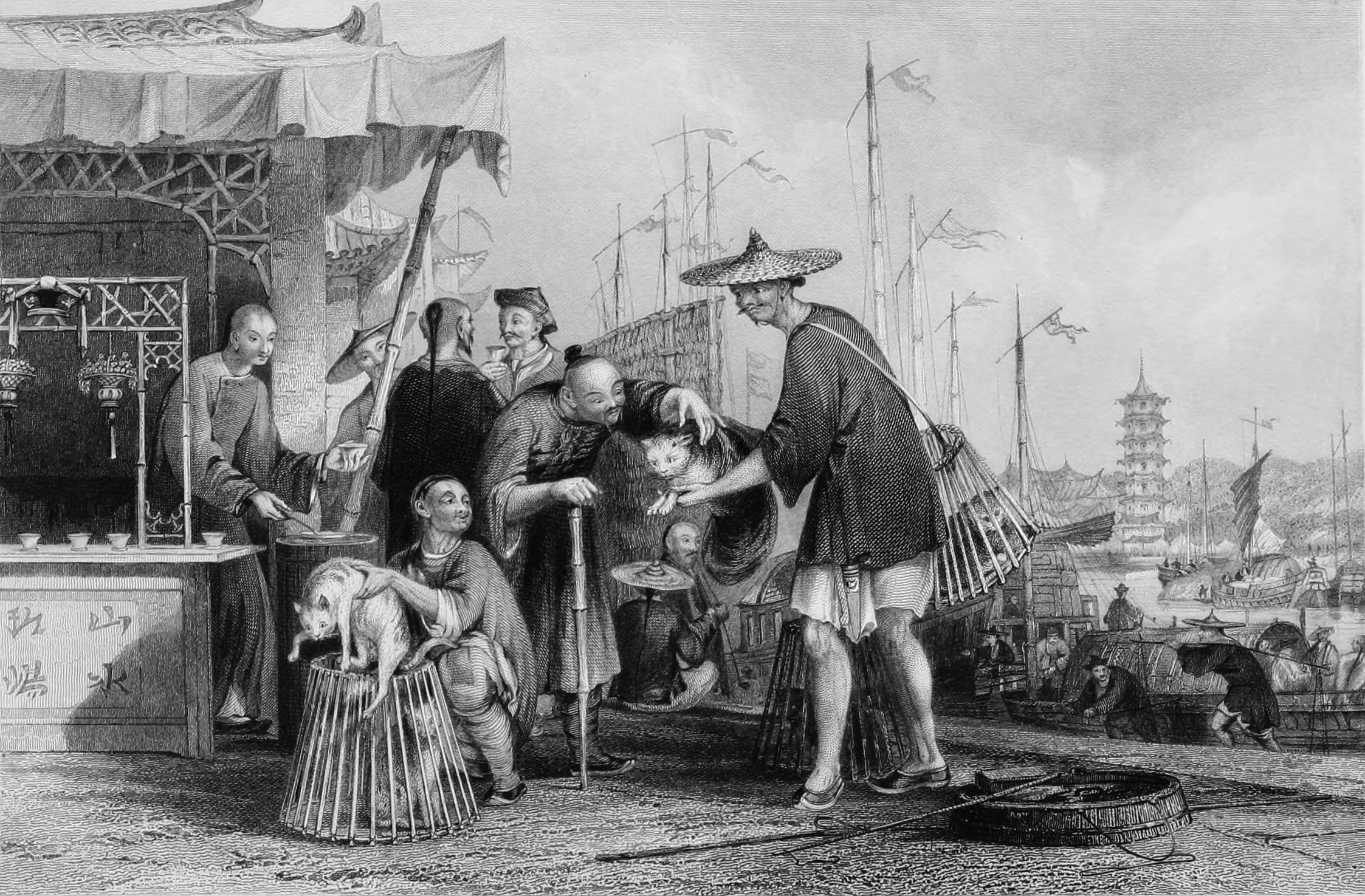
"Cat-merchants and tea-delears at Tongzhou", late 18th century

Tongzhou was founded in 195 BC during the Western Han dynasty under the name of Lu (路) County, although there is evidence for human settlement in the Neolithic. At the start of the Eastern Han dynasty the character Lu by which it was known was altered by the addition of a water radical to become Lu (潞). In 1151 under the Jin dynasty Lu County was renamed Tongzhou, roughly meaning 'the place for passing through', in recognition of its importance as the land and water approach to Beijing.

=== Ming, Qing & Republican era ===
In July 1937, subsequent to the infamous Marco Polo Bridge Incident, Tongzhou became another site of determined Chinese resistance. In the Tongzhou mutiny troops of the nominally Japanese-puppet East Hebei Army rebelled and came to the aid of hard-pressed Kuomintang troops, and attacked the Japanese garrison. In the fall of Tongzhou to the Nationalists, many civilians were tortured and murdered as well as captured Japanese military personnel.

=== People's Republic ===
The place name changed to Tong County (simplified Chinese: 通县; traditional Chinese: 通縣; pinyin: Tōng Xiàn) when the area was placed under the new municipal region of Beijing in 1914. It again reverted to "Tongzhou" when the area was upgraded in 1997 to a district.

On 11 July 2015, Tongzhou became the second administrative seat of Beijing as a "sub-administrative center" for the municipality. Numerous local government departments will be moved to Tongzhou to reduce crowding within the city center of Beijing.

== Economy ==
In 2017, the regional GDP of the district was 75.8 billion yuan, with GDP per capita at 50.3 thousand yuan.

== Geography and environment ==
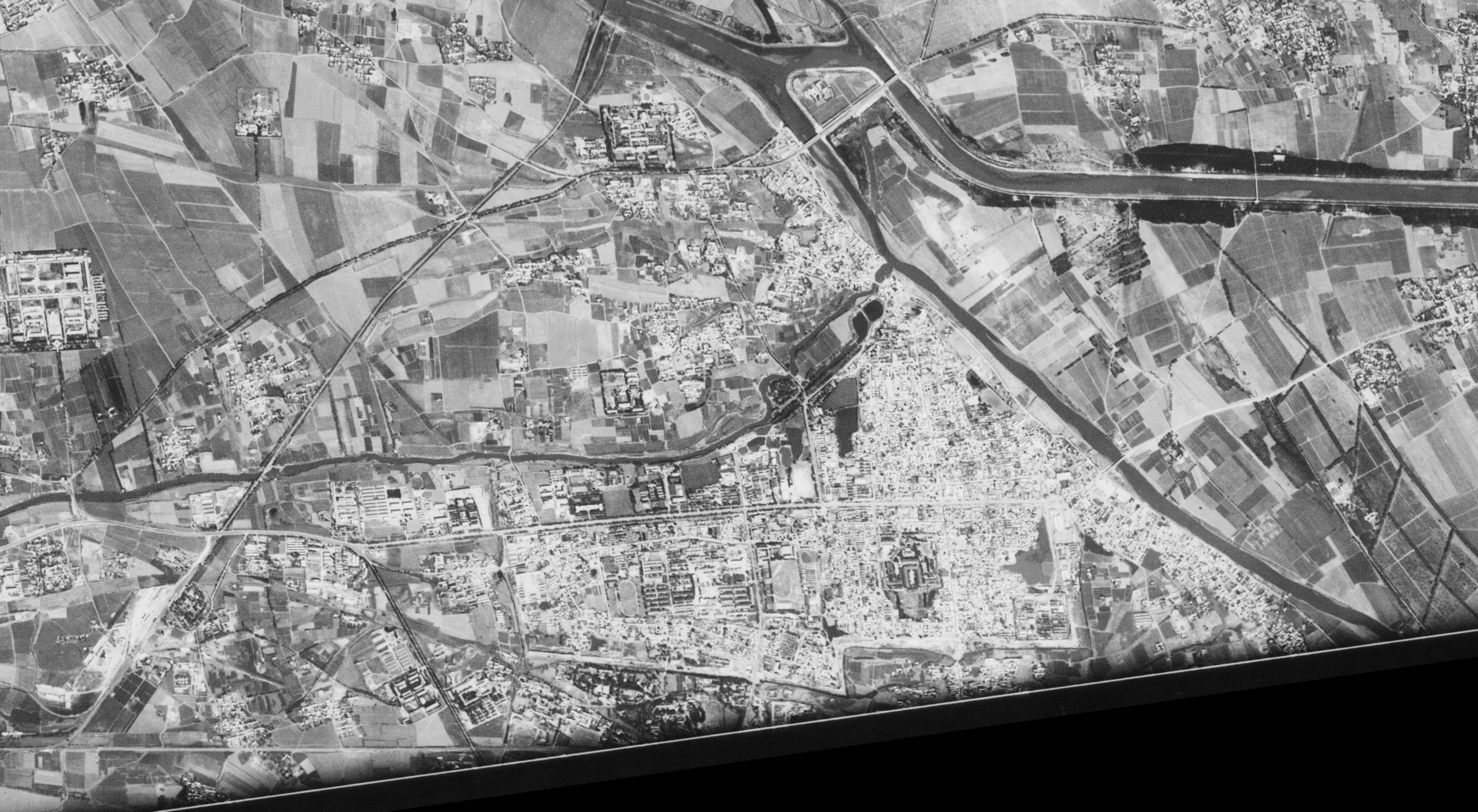
Satellite image of part of Tongzhou District in September 1967

Tongzhou District borders the Beijing districts of Shunyi, Chaoyang and Daxing, Wuqing District of Tianjin Municipality, and Langfang City (both the Sanhe City−Dachang County−Xianghe County exclave and Guangyang District) of Hebei province, and is 19 km (12 miles) from Tiananmen Square and 16 km (10 miles) from Beijing Capital International Airport.

Tongzhou is situated on the North China Plain with an average elevation of 20 meters (66 ft). Its climate belongs to the mild temperate zone, with distinct seasons including hot summers and freezing winters. Dust storms are common. It has an annual mean temperature of 13.2 °C (55.8 °F). and 536.6 mm (21.13 in) of rainfall. Several large rivers, among them the Wenyu, the Liangshui and Chaobai flow through the district.

=== Climate ===
Tongzhou District has a humid continental climate with humid subtropical influences (Köppen climate classification Dwa/Cwa). The average annual temperature in Tongzhou is 13.2 °C (55.8 °F). The average annual rainfall is 536.6 mm (21.13 in) with July as the wettest month. The temperatures are highest on average in July, at around 27.0 °C (80.6 °F), and lowest in January, at around −2.7 °C (27.1 °F).

Climate data for Tongzhou District, elevation 20 m (66 ft), (1991–2020 normals, extremes 1981–present)
Month	Jan	Feb	Mar	Apr	May	Jun	Jul	Aug	Sep	Oct	Nov	Dec	Year
Record high °C (°F)	13.5 (56.3)	20.1 (68.2)	29.2 (84.6)	32.1 (89.8)	37.9 (100.2)	40.2 (104.4)	41.9 (107.4)	38.1 (100.6)	35.0 (95.0)	30.6 (87.1)	21.3 (70.3)	13.5 (56.3)	41.9 (107.4)
Mean daily maximum °C (°F)	2.1 (35.8)	6.0 (42.8)	13.0 (55.4)	20.9 (69.6)	27.0 (80.6)	30.7 (87.3)	31.8 (89.2)	30.7 (87.3)	26.5 (79.7)	19.2 (66.6)	10.2 (50.4)	3.5 (38.3)	18.5 (65.3)
Daily mean °C (°F)	−2.7 (27.1)	0.6 (33.1)	7.2 (45.0)	14.9 (58.8)	21.1 (70.0)	25.0 (77.0)	27.0 (80.6)	26.0 (78.8)	21.0 (69.8)	13.7 (56.7)	5.2 (41.4)	−1.0 (30.2)	13.2 (55.7)
Mean daily minimum °C (°F)	−6.8 (19.8)	−3.9 (25.0)	2.2 (36.0)	9.3 (48.7)	15.2 (59.4)	20.0 (68.0)	22.9 (73.2)	21.9 (71.4)	16.3 (61.3)	8.9 (48.0)	1.1 (34.0)	−4.7 (23.5)	8.5 (47.4)
Record low °C (°F)	−22.4 (−8.3)	−14.8 (5.4)	−7.3 (18.9)	1.2 (34.2)	2.6 (36.7)	11.7 (53.1)	16.5 (61.7)	15.0 (59.0)	7.2 (45.0)	−2.0 (28.4)	−6.9 (19.6)	−18.7 (−1.7)	−22.4 (−8.3)
Average precipitation mm (inches)	2.1 (0.08)	5.4 (0.21)	7.6 (0.30)	22.4 (0.88)	37.7 (1.48)	77.8 (3.06)	169.6 (6.68)	115.2 (4.54)	54.5 (2.15)	28.7 (1.13)	13.8 (0.54)	1.8 (0.07)	536.6 (21.12)
Average precipitation days (≥ 0.1 mm)	1.2	1.9	2.5	4.6	5.5	9.4	11.5	9.6	6.7	4.7	2.9	1.4	61.9
Average snowy days	2.9	2.3	1.0	0.2	0	0	0	0	0	0	1.8	2.5	10.7
Average relative humidity (%)	43	42	41	43	49	60	71	73	66	60	54	46	54
Mean monthly sunshine hours	176.8	179.5	224.0	239.0	264.3	224.0	190.3	205.9	203.3	193.6	162.0	164.4	2,427.1
Percentage possible sunshine	59	59	60	60	59	50	42	49	55	57	55	57	55
Source: China Meteorological Administration all-time extreme temperature

== Administrative divisions ==
Tongzhou District is divided into 11 subdistricts, ten towns, and one ethnic township.

Name	Chinese (S)	Hanyu Pinyin	Population (2010)	Area (km^{2})	Population density (per km^{2})
Zhongcang Subdistrict	中仓街道	Zhōngcāng Jiēdào	57,550	6.50	8,854
Xinhua Subdistrict	新华街道	Xīnhuá Jiēdào	8,891	3.25	2,736
Tongyun Subdistrict	通运街道	Tōngyùn Jiēdào	8,891	3.25	2,736
Beiyuan Subdistrict	北苑街道	Běiyuàn Jiēdào	73,423	36.60	2,006
Yuqiao Subdistrict	玉桥街道	Yùqiáo Jiēdào	64,482	11.20	5,757
Luyuan Subdistrict	潞源街道	Lùyuán Jiēdào	72,611	144.00	504
Wenjing Subdistrict	文景街道	Wénjǐng Jiēdào			
Jiukeshu Subdistrict	九棵树街道	Jiǔkēshù Jiēdào			
Linheli Subdistrict	临河里街道	Línhélǐ Jiēdào			
Yangzhuang Subdistrict	杨庄街道	Yángzhuāng Jiēdào			
Luyi Subdistrict	潞邑街道	Lùyì Jiēdào			
Lucheng town	潞城镇	Lùchéng Zhèn			
Yongshun town	永顺镇	Yǒngshùn Zhèn	195,194	39.46	4,947
Liyuan town	梨园镇	Líyuán Zhèn	140,520	24.87	5,650
Songzhuang town	宋庄镇	Sòngzhuāng Zhèn	104,143	116.00	898
Zhangjiawan town	张家湾镇	Zhāngjiāwān Zhèn	89,273	105.80	844
Huoxian town	漷县镇	Huǒxiàn Zhèn	61,413	113.68	540
Majuqiao town	马驹桥镇	Mǎjūqiáo Zhèn	107,048	82.00	1,305
Xiji town	西集镇	Xījí Zhèn	43,244	95.29	454
Taihu town	台湖镇	Táihú Zhèn	99,039	82.50	1,200
Yongledian town	永乐店镇	Yǒnglèdiàn Zhèn	40,241	105.00	383
Yujiawu Hui Ethnic Township	于家务回族乡	Yújiāwù Huízú Xiāng	27,184	65.70	414

Wenjing Subdistrict, Jiukeshu Subdistrict, Linheli Subdistrict, Yangzhuang Subdistrict, and Luyi Subdistrict were created by the Tongzhou District Government on 11 May 2020.

== Transportation ==
Downtown Tongzhou is connected to downtown Beijing by Jingtong Expressway and several metro lines operated by Beijing Subway. Beijing's Fifth and Sixth Ring Road are roughly equidistant from Tongzhou's CBD. Highways lead to Shenyang, Harbin and Tianjin/Tanggu.

=== Metro ===
Tongzhou is currently served by six metro lines operated by Beijing Subway:

- Line 6 – Wuzixueyuanlu, Tongzhou Beiguan, Beiyunhe West, Beiyunhe East, Haojiafu, Dongxiayuan, Lucheng, Luyang
- Line 7 – Wansheng Xi (West), Wansheng Dong (East), Qun Fang, Gao Lou Jin, Hua Zhuang Batong , Universal Resort Batong
- Line 17 (S) – Beishenshu, Ciqubei, Ciqu Yizhuang , Jiahuihu
- Batong line – Tongzhou Beiyuan, Guoyuan, Jiukeshu, Liyuan, Linheli, Tu Qiao, Hua Zhuang 7 , Universal Resort 7
- Yizhuang line – Tongjinanlu, Jinghailu, Ciqu South, Ciqu 17 , Yizhuang railway station
- Yizhuang T1 line – Jinghai Yilu, Dinghaiyuanxi, Dinghaiyuan

=== Suburban railway ===
Tongzhou is also served by two suburban railway lines:

- Sub-Central – Tongzhou, Qiaozhuang East
- Tongmi – Tongzhou West

== Industry and tourism ==
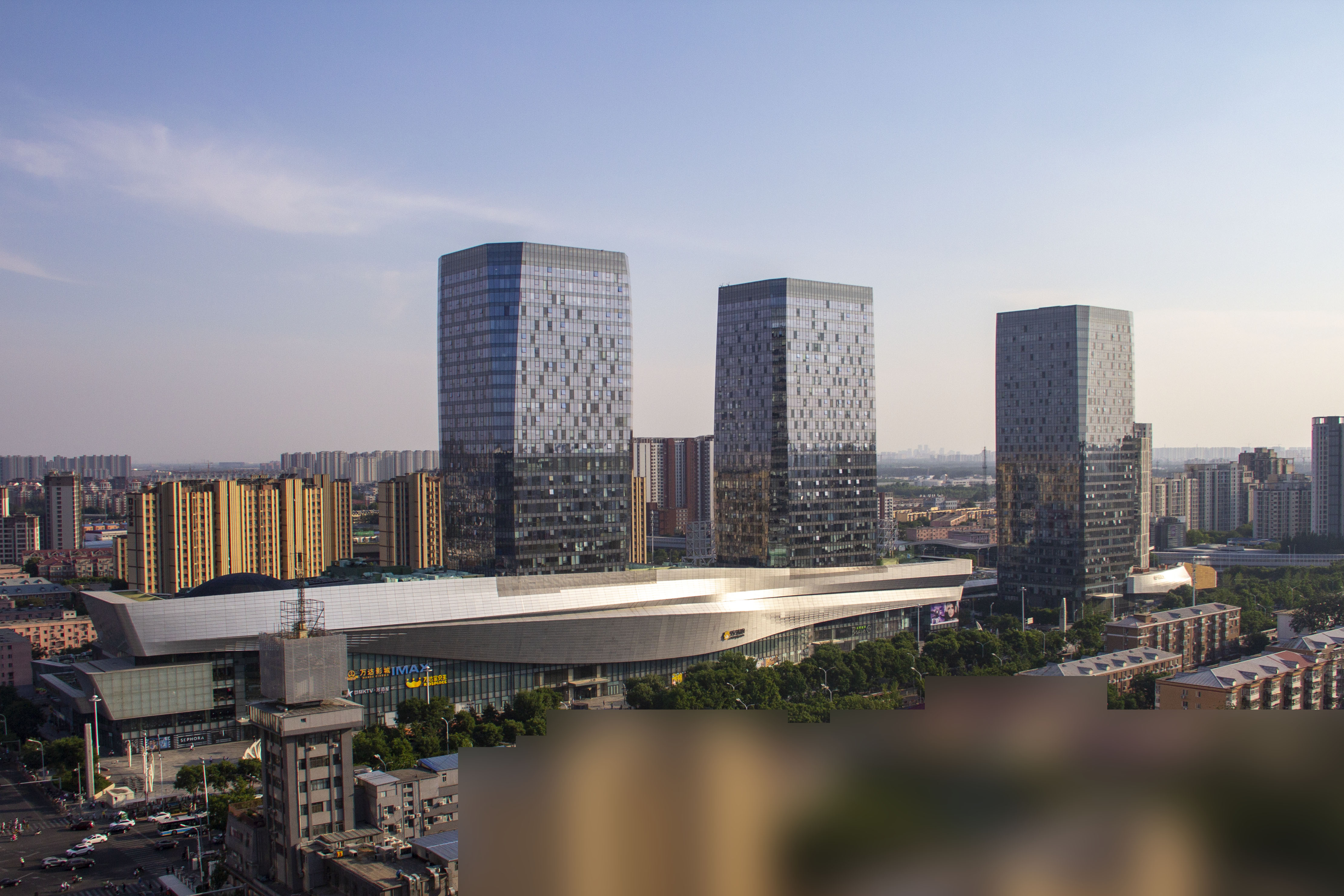
Tongzhou Wanda Plaza

There are seven industrial zones with a total area of 64 square kilometers (25 sq mi) in Tongzhou, focusing on manufacturing and high-tech industries. Downtown Tongzhou is earmarked for redevelopment into a comprehensive central business district with an emphasis on consumer retail. In agriculture, the district emphasizes on horticulture, fruit-farming, seed-growing and aquatics. The district government is currently promoting Tongzhou's position at the head of the Grand Canal to attract tourists to its Grand Canal Cultural Park.

The Songzhuang artists' village, where many Chinese contemporary artists live and work, is located in the Tongzhou District.

The Universal Beijing Resort is also located in Tongzhou, and opened on 20 September 2021.

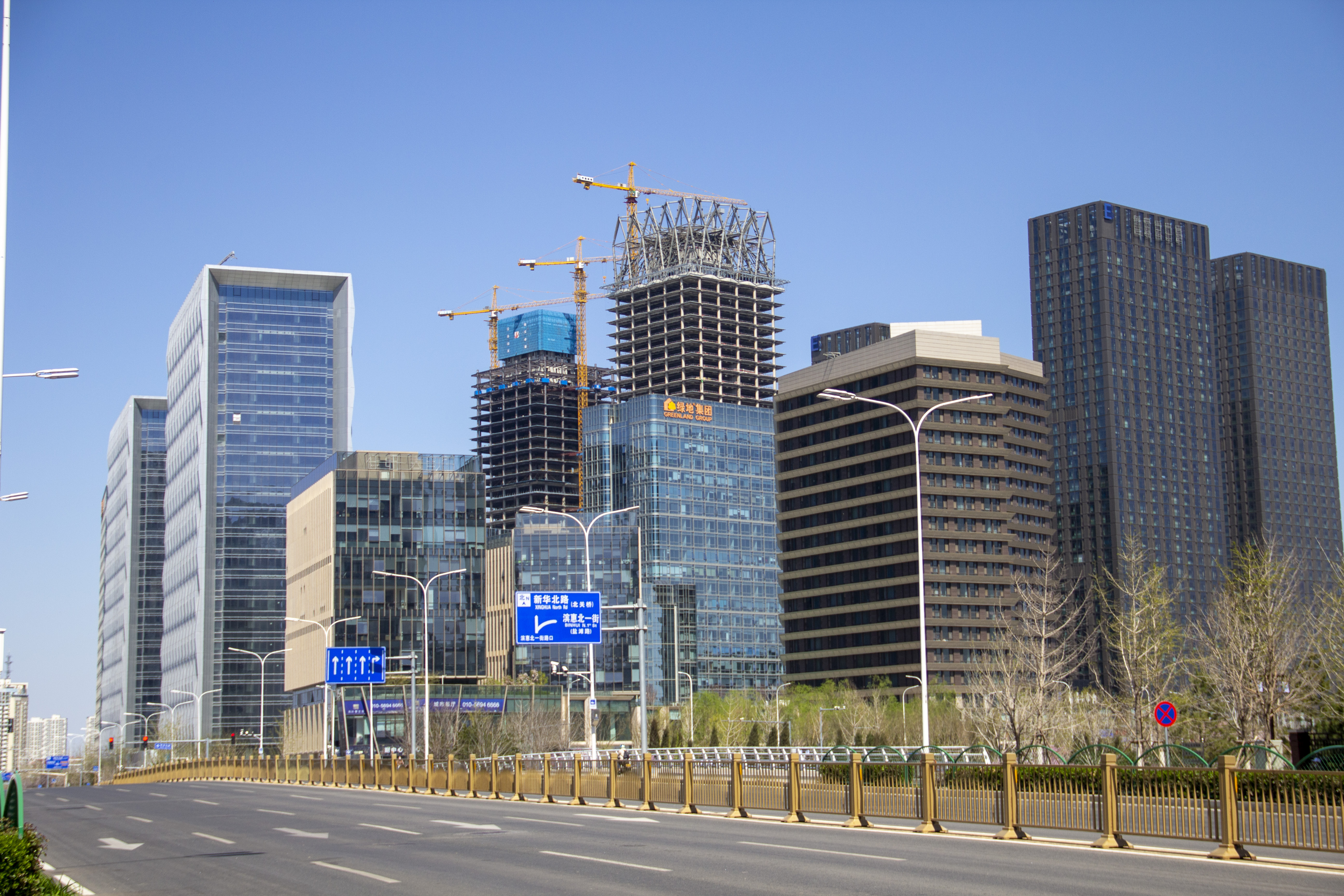
Canal Business District in April 2020

Canal Business District is under construction. Headquarters of Beijing branches of Central Government-owned Enterprises and Headquarters of Beijing Government-owned Enterprises will move to Tongzhou. Canal Business District plans to develop industrial clusters of headquarters economy and wealth management.

Gallery of the construction site of Canal Business District:

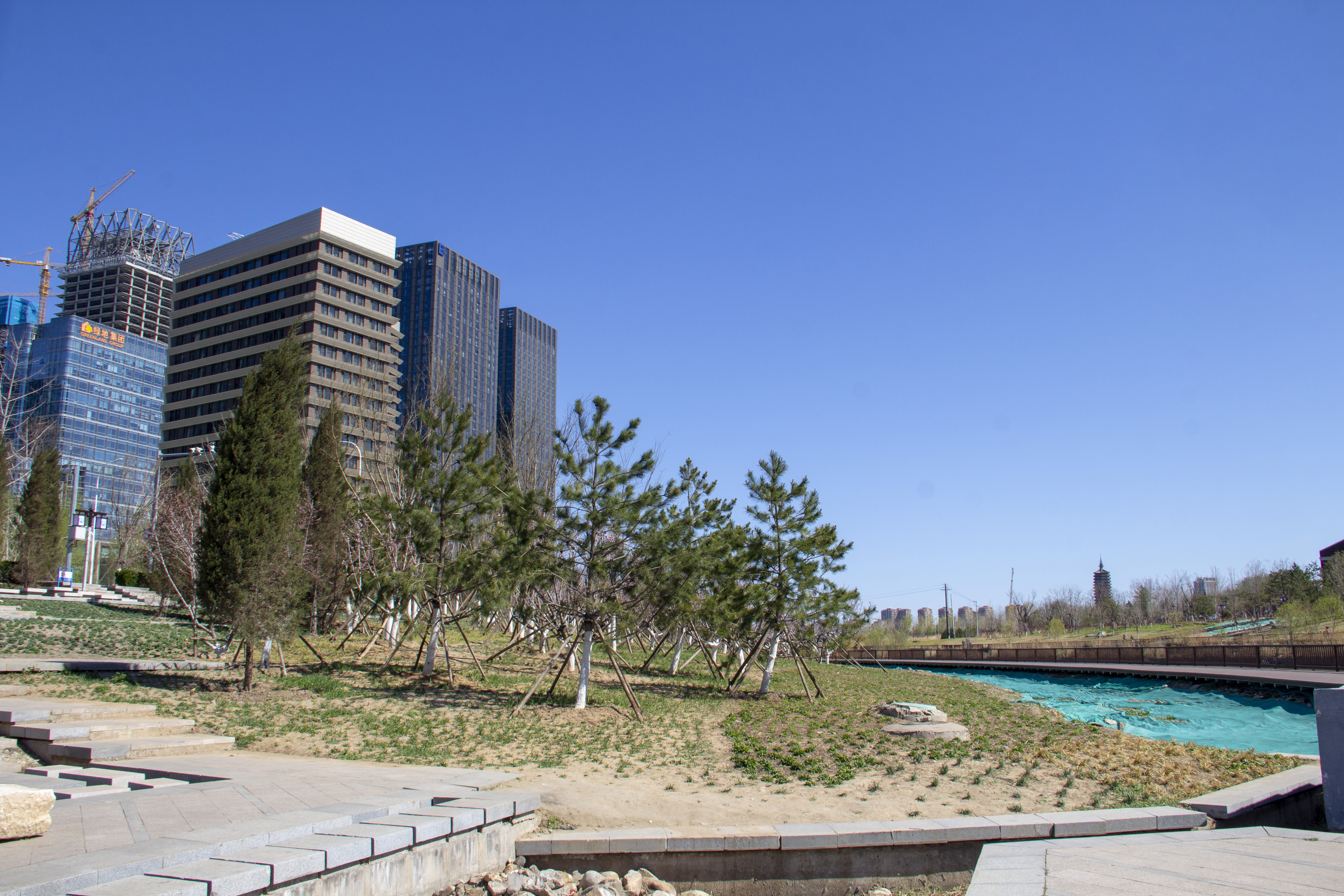

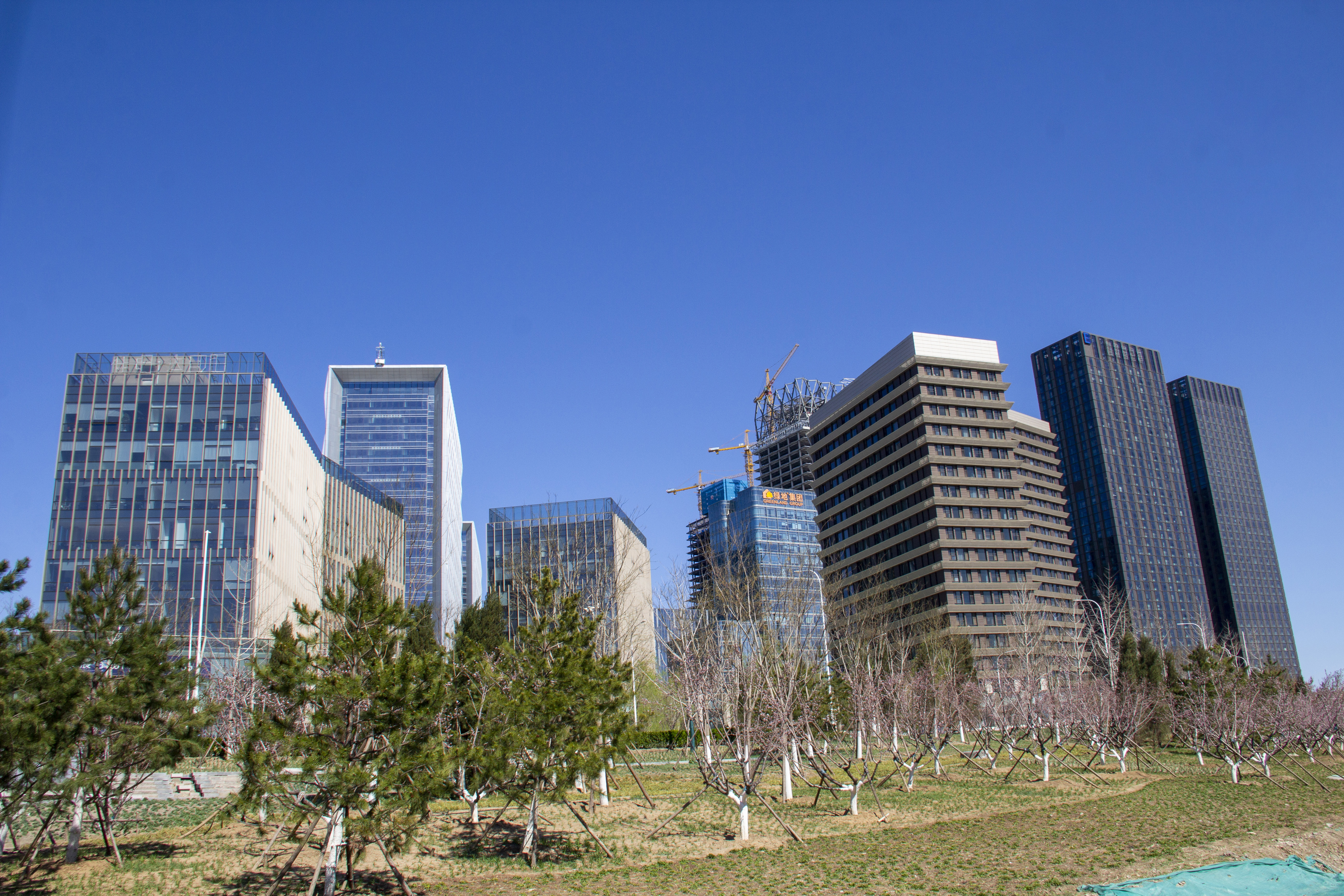

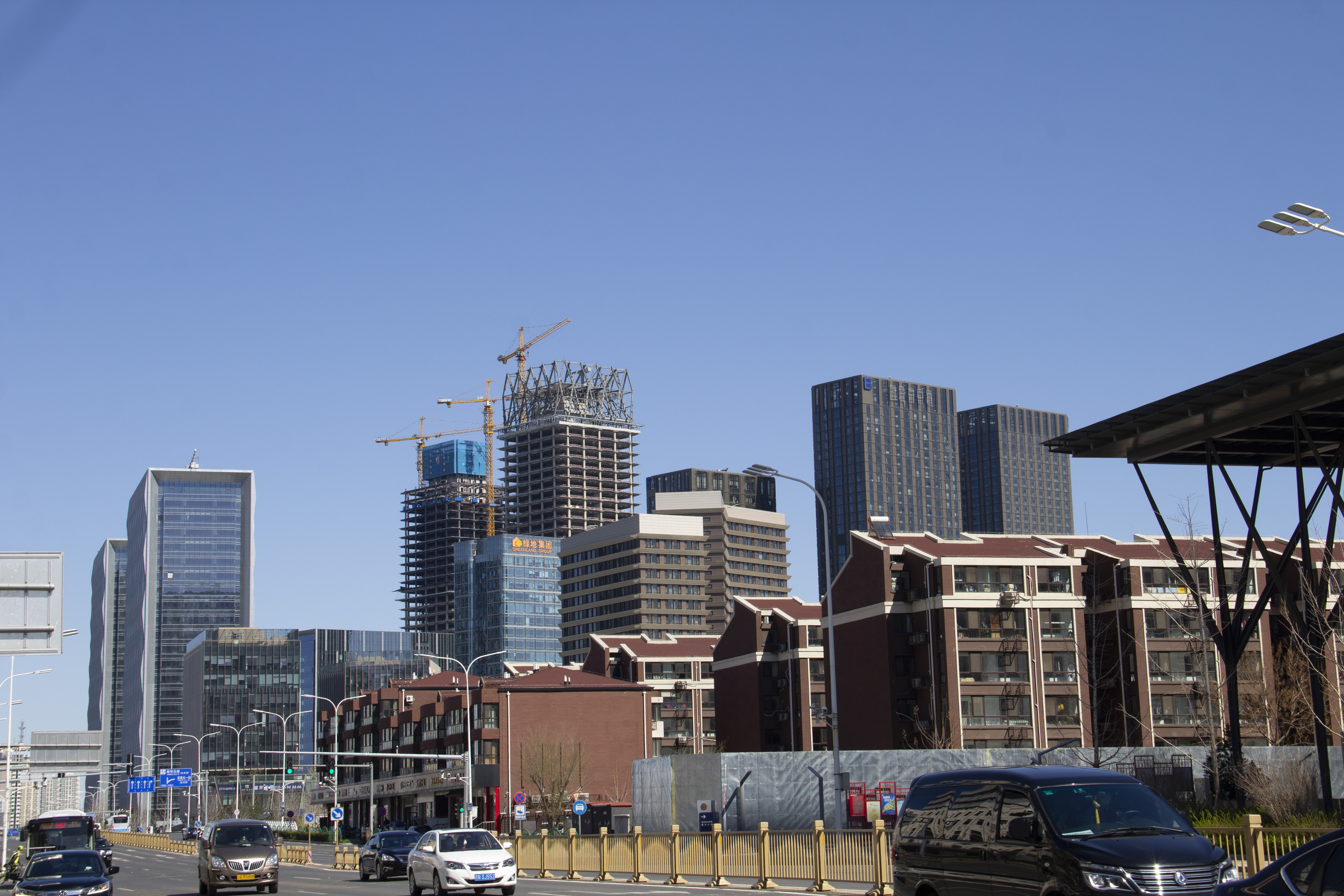

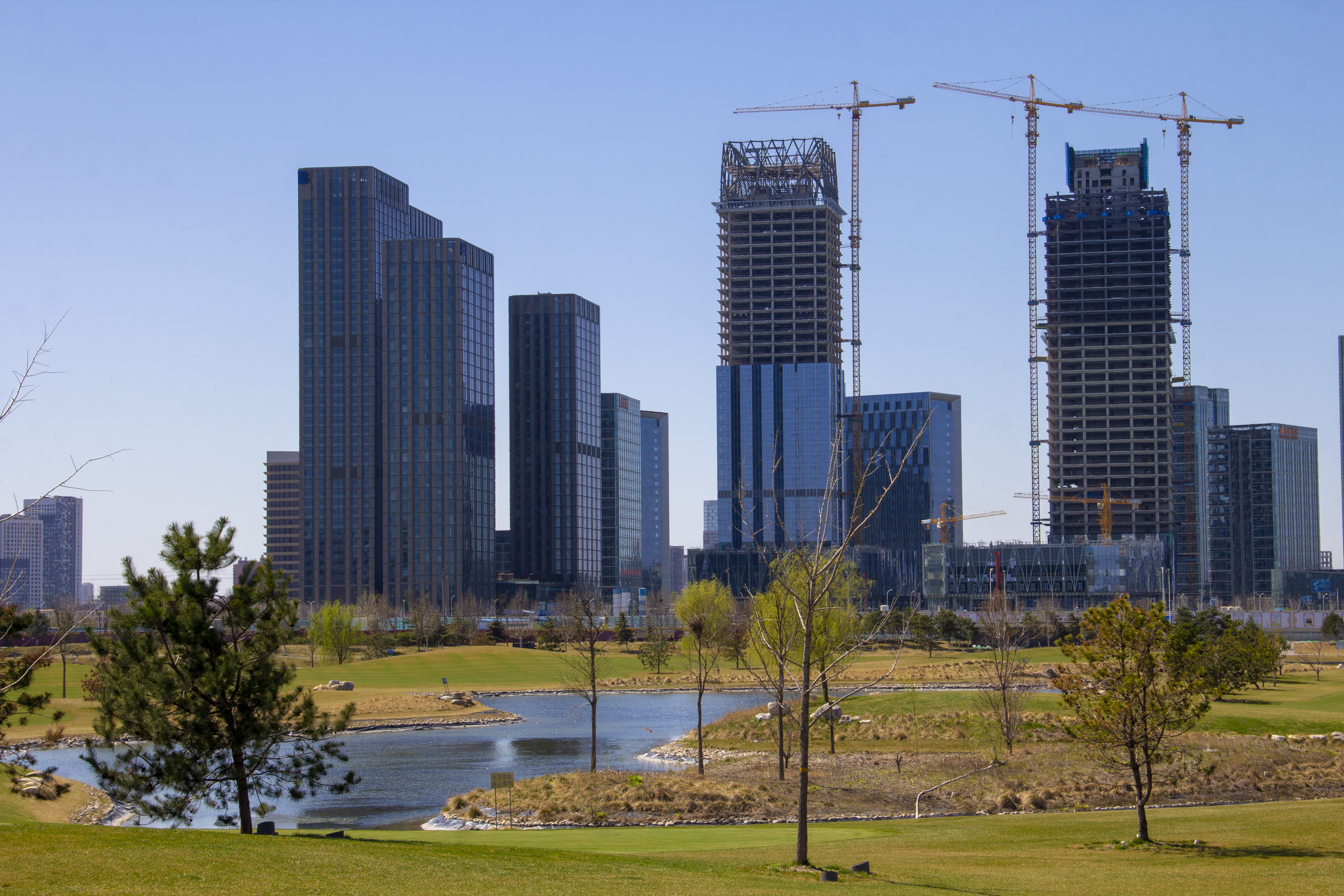

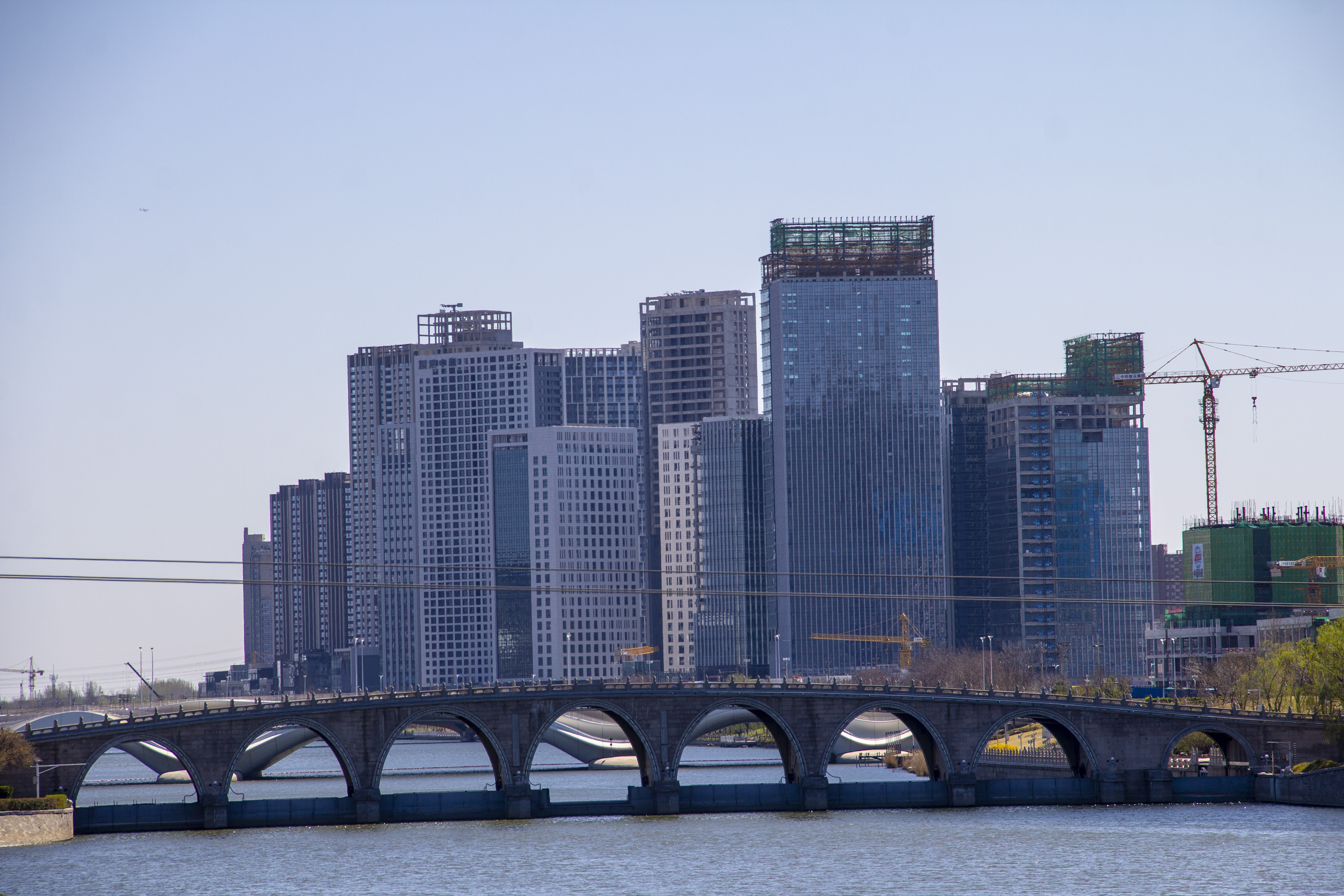

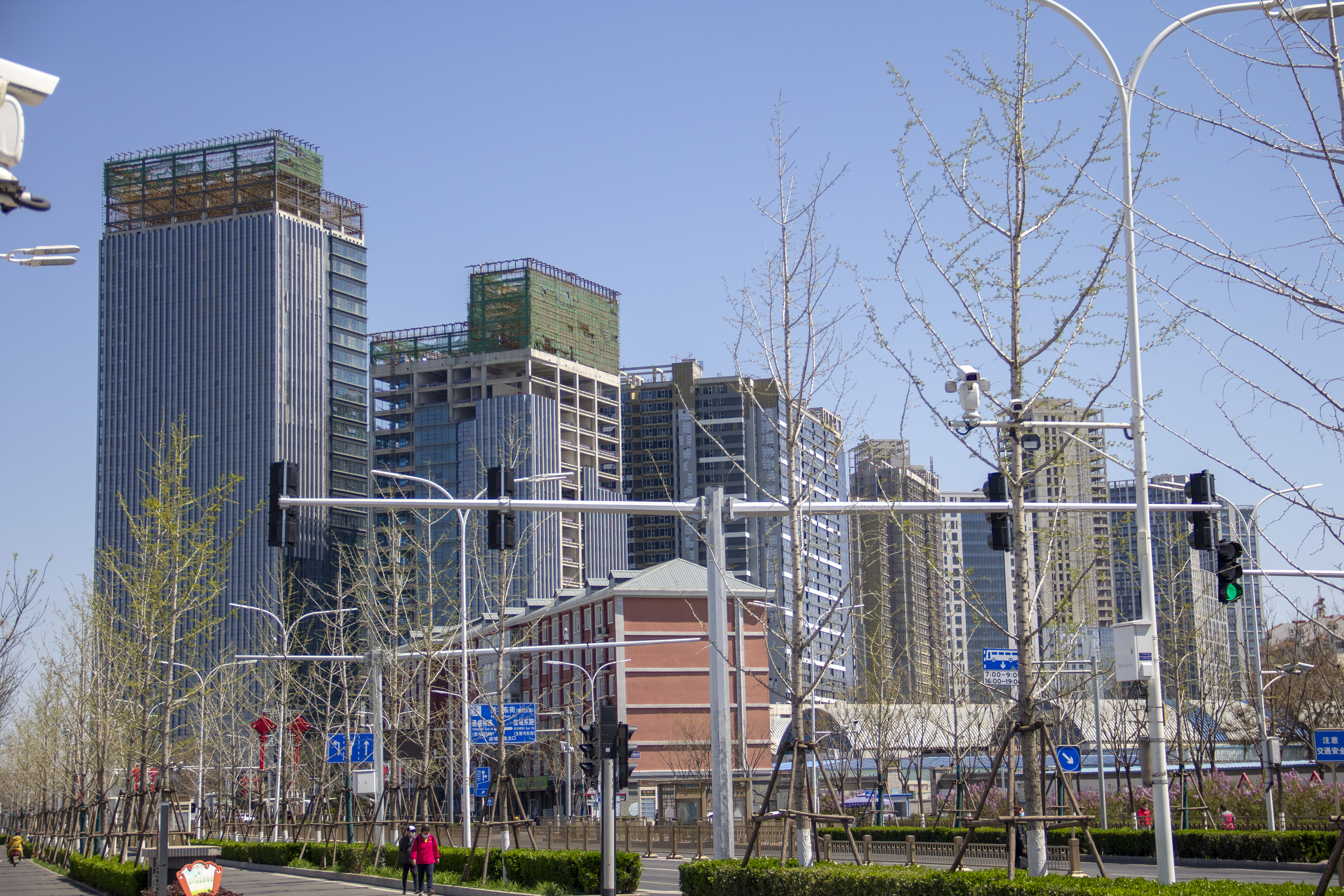

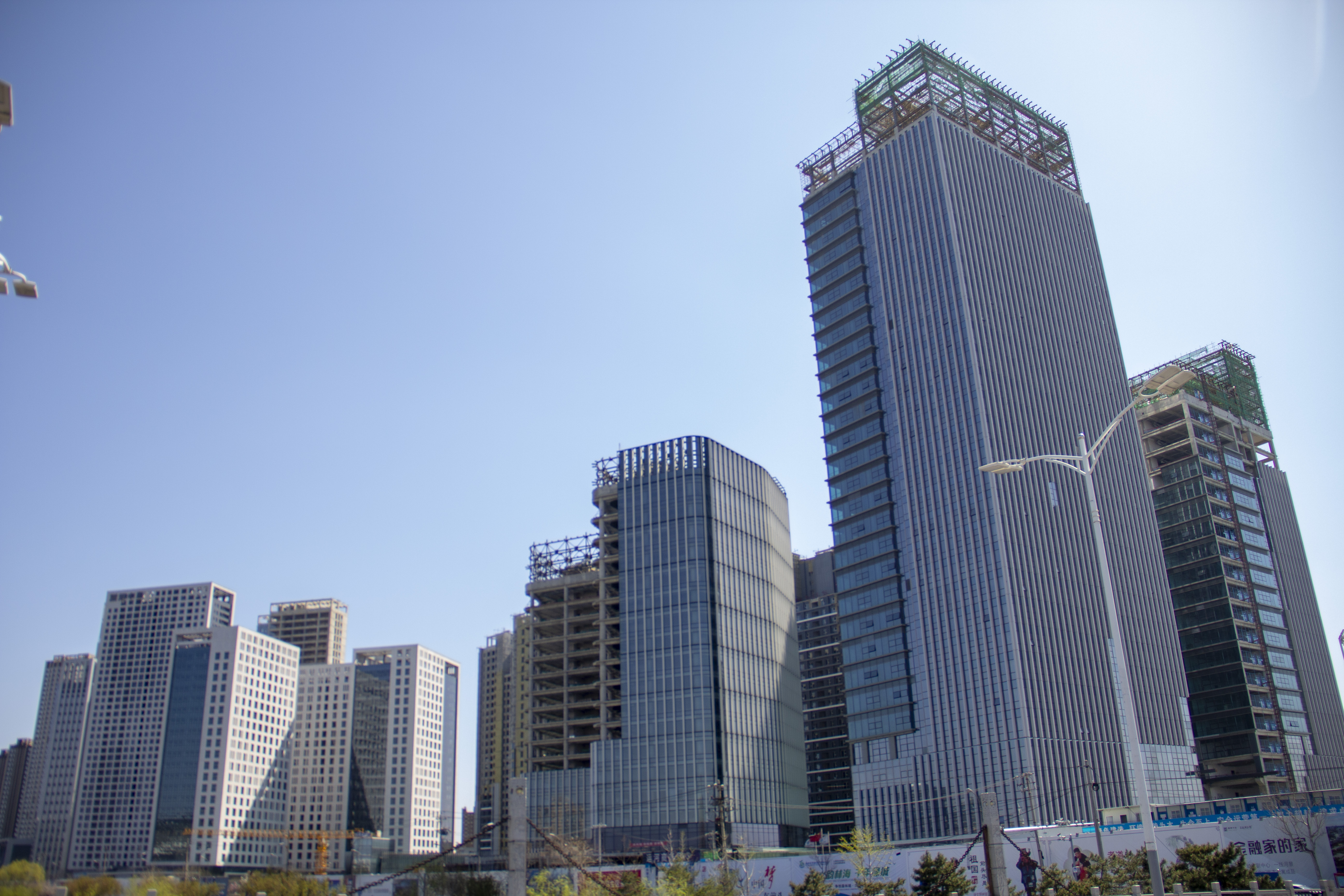

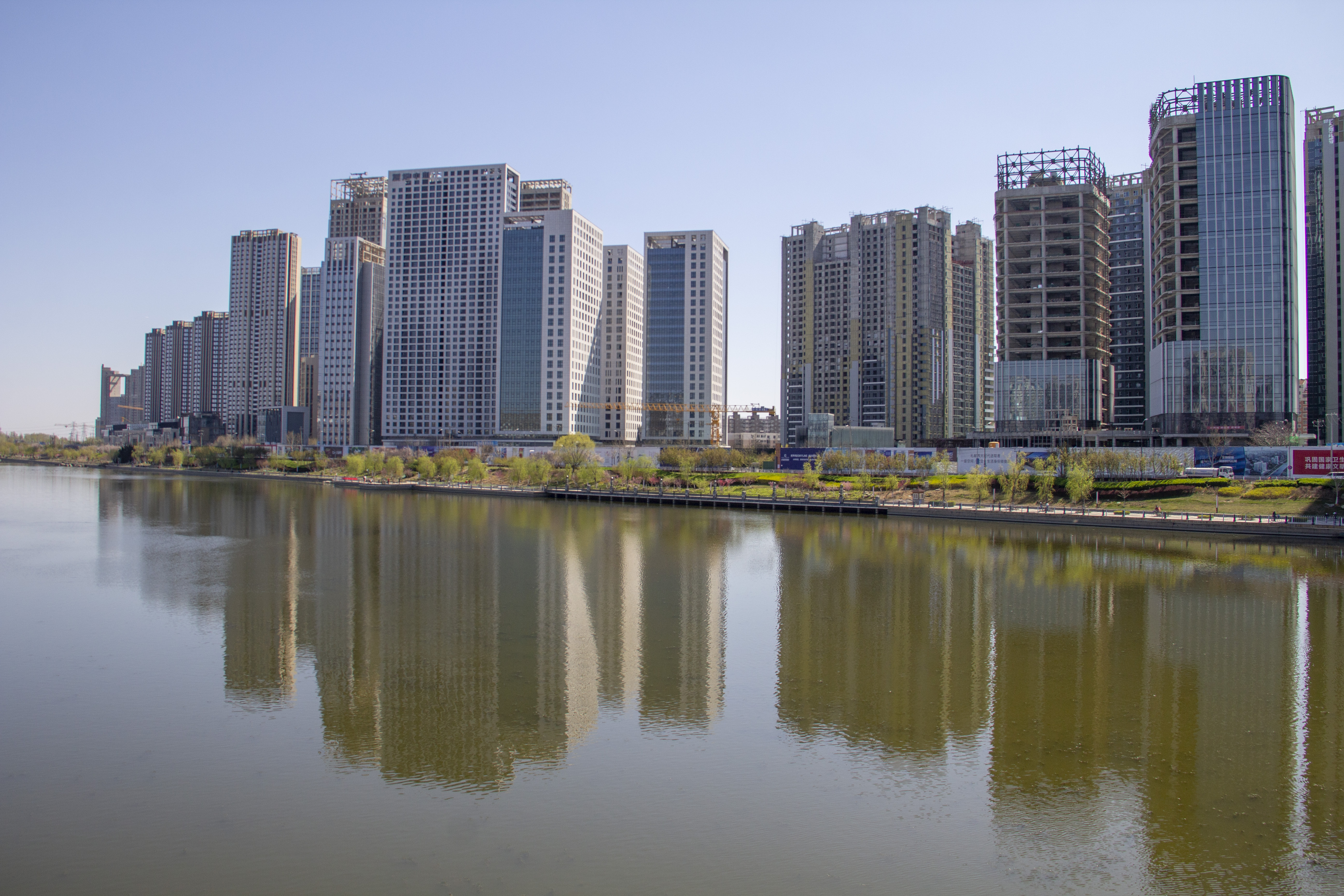

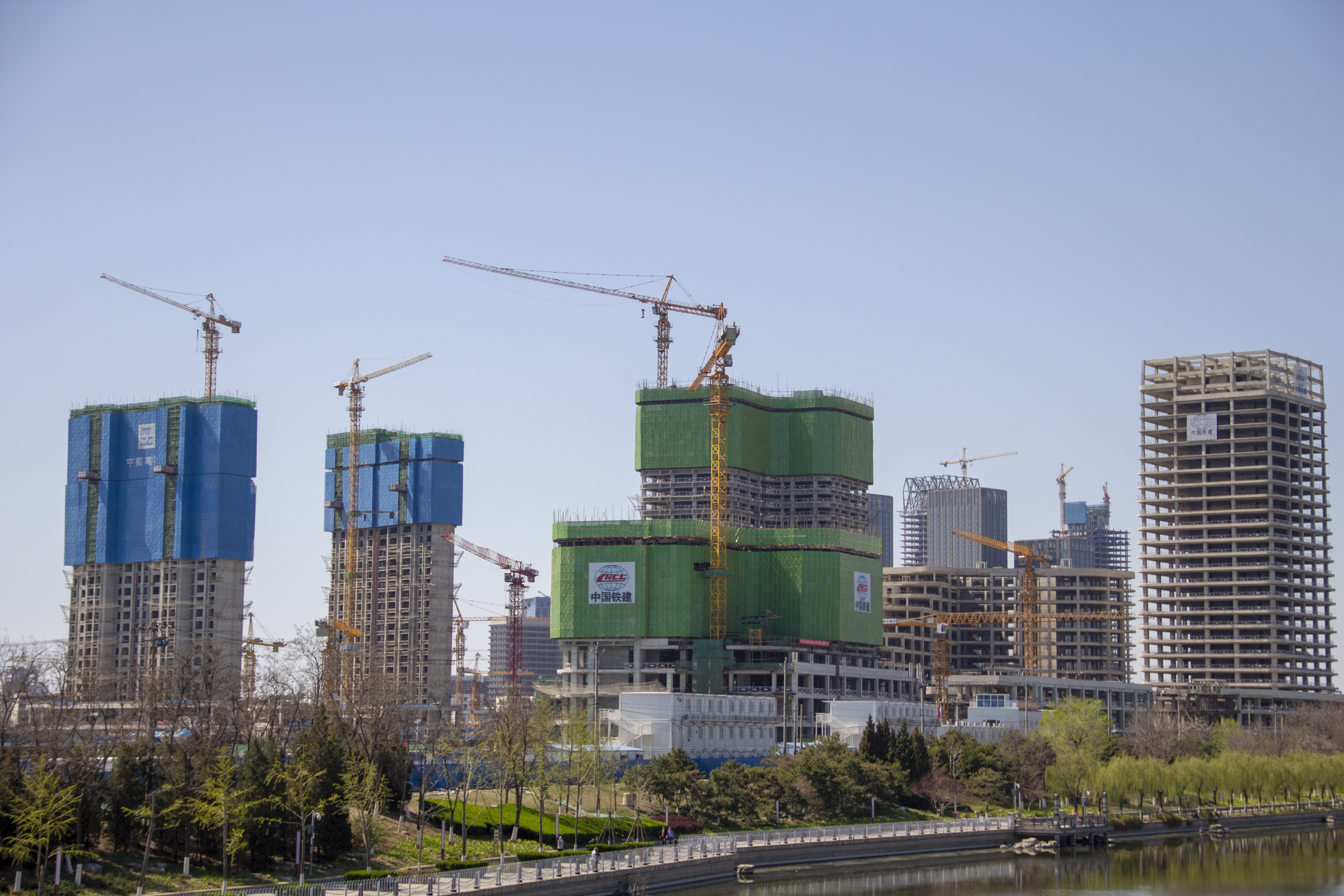

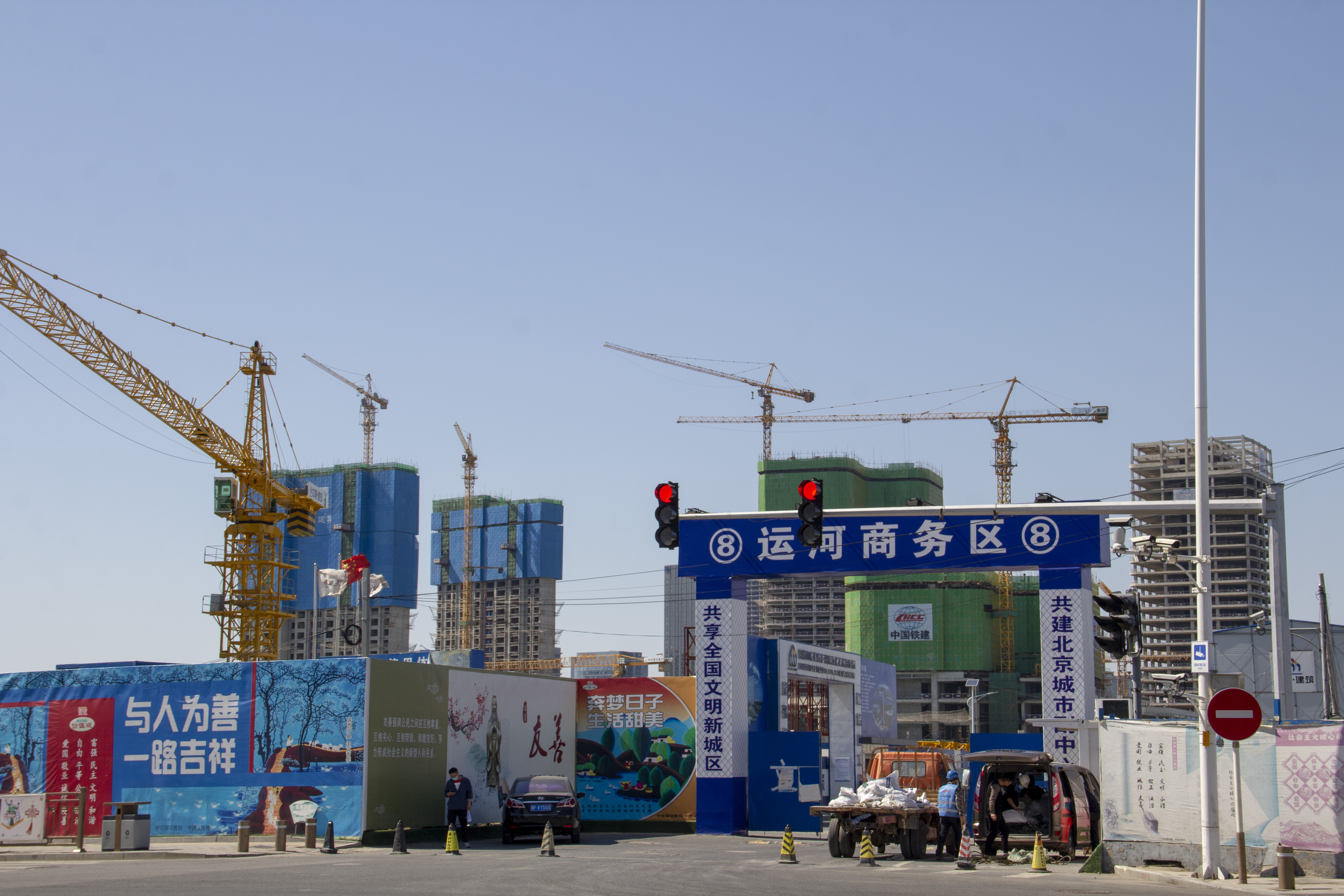

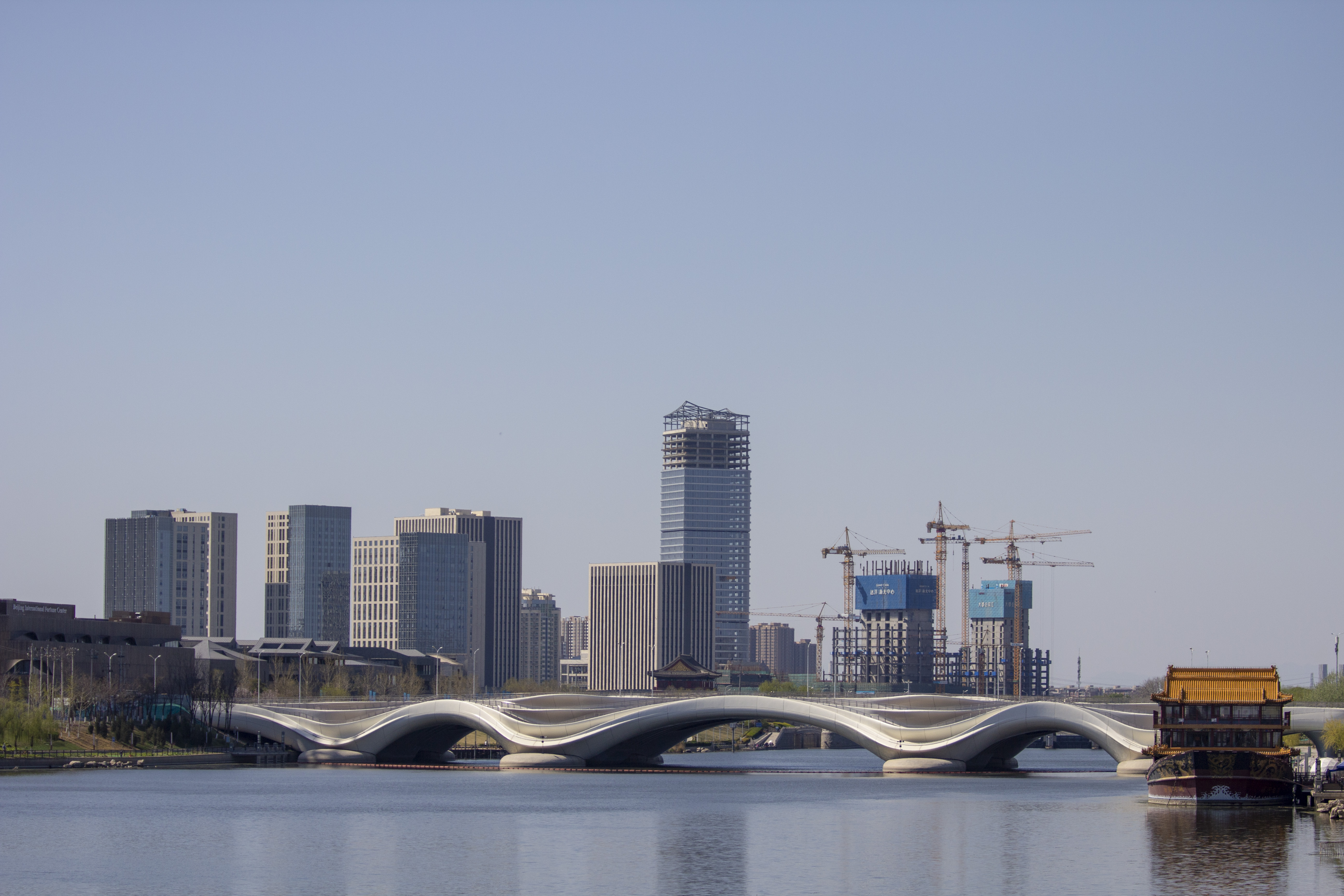

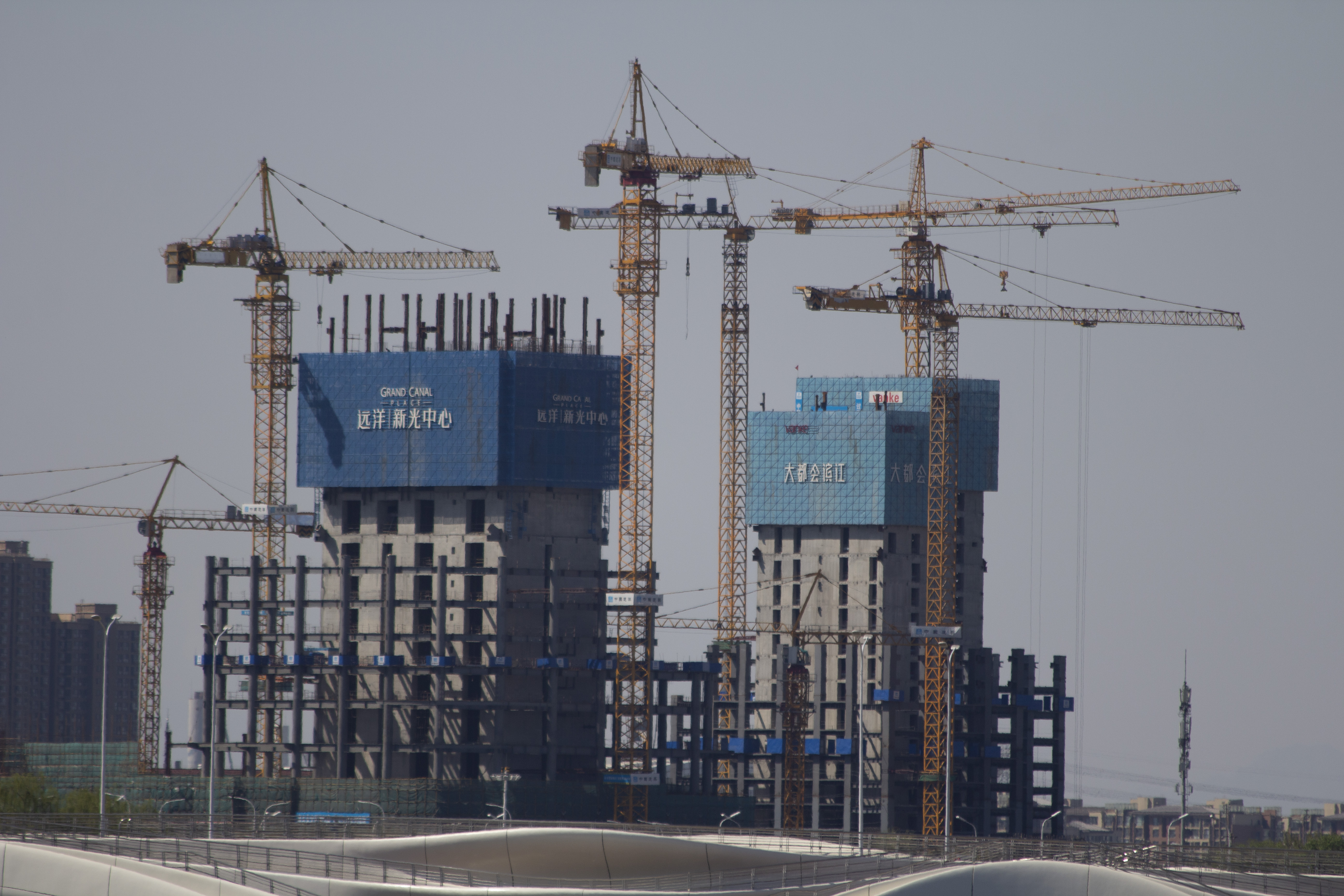

== Education and health ==
Tongzhou has good education facilities including 113 kindergartens, 141 primary schools, 51 high schools and many adult education colleges. It also boasts the Beijing Materials Institute, Beijing University of Technology and the Beijing Institute of Music. Its hospitals include a specialist tuberculosis treatment center and a hospital specializing in traditional Chinese medicine.

Private schools include:

- Beijing Shuren Ribet Private School

== See also ==
- List of administrative divisions of Beijing
