= Huoxian, Beijing =

Huoxian Town 漷县镇
- Town
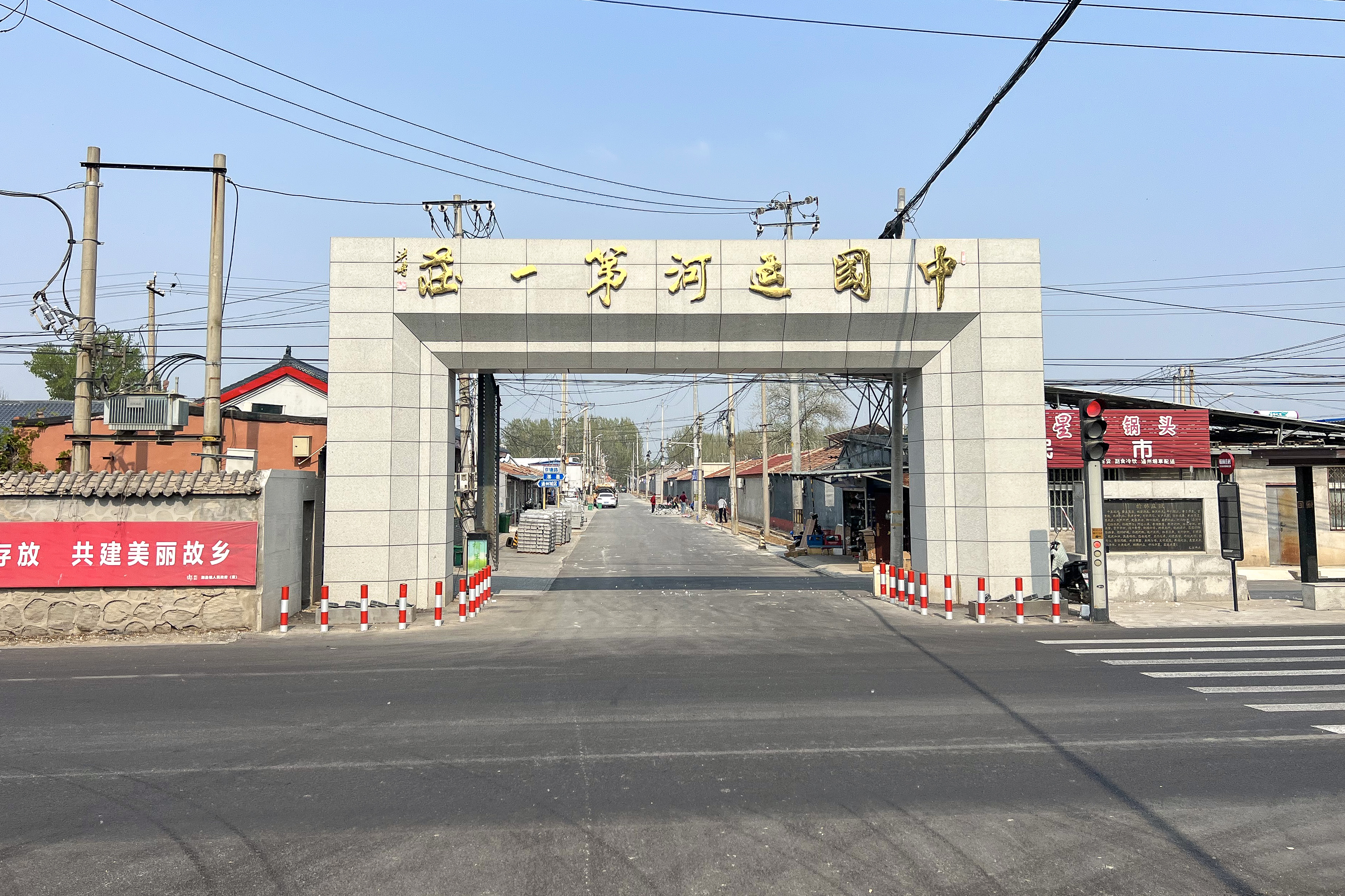
- Map of Huoxian village (location of the town's government) and surrounding villages. Xiji Town is on the east side of Grand Canal
- Location within Beijing Location within China
- Coordinates: 39°46′43″N 116°47′15″E
- Country: China
- Municipality: Beijing
- District: Tongzhou
- Village-level Divisions: 3 communities 61 villages

Area
  - Total: 113.4 km^{2} (43.8 sq mi)

Population (2020)
  - Total: 68,466
  - Density: 603.8/km^{2} (1,564/sq mi)
- Time zone: UTC+8 (China Standard)
- Postal code: 101109
- Area code: 010

Huoxian Town (Chinese: 漷县镇; pinyin: Huǒxiàn Zhèn) is a town located on Tongzhou District, Beijing, China. It borders Xiji Town in its northeast, Anping Town in its east, Yongledian Town in its south, Yujiawu Hui Township in its southwest, and Zhangjiawan Town in its northwest. The 2020 Chinese census counted 68,466 residents for this town.

== History ==
Timeline of Huoxian Town
Time	Status	WIthin
Liao dynasty	Huoyin County	Xijin Prefecture
Yuan dynasty	Huo Canton	Dadu Circuit
Ming dynasty	Huo County	Tongzhou
Qing dynasty	Huo County	Tongzhou Direct-controlled District
1946 – 1953	Matou Township	Tong County
1953 – 1958	3rd District	Tong County
1958 – 1961	Huoxian Management District, under Matou People's Commune	Tong County
1961 – 1983	Huoxian People's Commune	Tong County
1983 – 1990	Huoxian Township	Tong County
1990 – 1997	Huoxian Town	Tong County
1997 – 2000	Huoxian Town	Tongzhou District
2000 – 2001	Huoxian Town (Incorporated Caochang Township in 2000)	Tongzhou District
2001–present	Huoxian Town (Incorporated Mizidian Town in 2001)	Tongzhou District

== Administration divisions ==
As of 2021, Huoxian Town was constituted by 64 subdivisions, including 3 residential communities and 61 villages:

Administrative division code	Subdivision names	Name transliteration	Type
110112106001	绿茵小区	Lüyin Xiaoqu	Community
110112106002	绿茵西区	Lüyin Xiqu	Community
110112106003	金三角	Jinsanjiao	Community
110112106201	漷县村	Huoxian Cun	Village
110112106202	中辛庄	Zhongxinzhuang	Village
110112106203	郭庄村	Guozhuang Cun	Village
110112106204	王楼	Wanglou	Village
110112106205	吴营村	Wuying Cun	Village
110112106206	靛庄村	Dianzhuang Cun	Village
110112106207	许各庄	Xugezhuang	Village
110112106208	南阳村	Nanyang Cun	Village
110112106209	翟各庄	Digezhuang	Village
110112106210	马务村	Mawu Cun	Village
110112106211	苏庄村	Suzhuang Cun	Village
110112106212	榆林庄	Yulinzhuang	Village
110112106213	长凌营村	Changlingying Cun	Village
110112106214	杨堤村	Yangdi Cun	Village
110112106215	三黄庄村	Sanhuangzhuang Cun	Village
110112106216	后地村	Houdi Cun	Village
110112106217	沈庄村	Shenzhuang Cun	Village
110112106218	小香仪村	Xiaoxiangyi Cun	Village
110112106219	大香仪	Daxiangyi	Village
110112106220	高庄村	Gaozhuang Cun	Village
110112106221	东黄垡村	Dong Huangfa Cun	Village
110112106222	西黄垡村	Xi Huangfa Cun	Village
110112106223	马堤村	Madi Cun	Village
110112106224	马头村	Matou Cun	Village
110112106225	石槽村	Shicao Cun	Village
110112106226	毛庄村	Maozhuang Cun	Village
110112106227	草厂	Caochang	Village
110112106228	南丁庄	Nandingzhuang	Village
110112106229	东鲁村	Donglu Cun	Village
110112106230	西鲁村	Xilu Cun	Village
110112106231	周起营	Zhouqiying	Village
110112106232	黄厂铺	Huangchangpu	Village
110112106233	北堤寺	Beidisi	Village
110112106234	觅子店	Mizidian	Village
110112106235	凌庄	Lingzhuang	Village
110112106236	马庄	Mazhuang	Village
110112106237	曹庄	Caozhuang	Village
110112106238	侯黄庄村	Houhuangzhuang Cun	Village
110112106239	张庄	Zhangzhuang	Village
110112106240	东寺庄	Dongsizhuang	Village
110112106241	小屯	Xiaotun	Village
110112106242	纪各庄	Jigezhuang	Village
110112106243	大柳树	Daliushu	Village
110112106244	军屯	Juntun	Village
110112106245	后尖平	Houjianping	Village
110112106246	徐官屯	Xuguantun	Village
110112106247	东定安	Dong Ding'an	Village
110112106248	西定安	Xi Ding'an	Village
110112106249	柏庄	Bozhuang	Village
110112106250	前尖平	Qianjianping	Village
110112106251	李辛庄	Lixinzhuang	Village
110112106252	尚武集	Shangwuji	Village
110112106253	龙庄	Longzhuang	Village
110112106254	南屯	Nantun	Village
110112106255	穆家坟	Mujiafen	Village
110112106256	军庄	Junzhuang	Village
110112106257	边槐庄	Bianhuaizhuang	Village
110112106258	梁家务	Liangjiawu	Village
110112106259	罗庄	Luozhuang	Village
110112106260	后元化	Hou Yuanhua	Village
110112106261	前元化	Qian Yuanhua	Village

== See also ==
- List of township-level divisions of Beijing
