= Jiukeshu Subdistrict =

Jiukeshu Subdistrict 九棵树街道
- Subdistrict
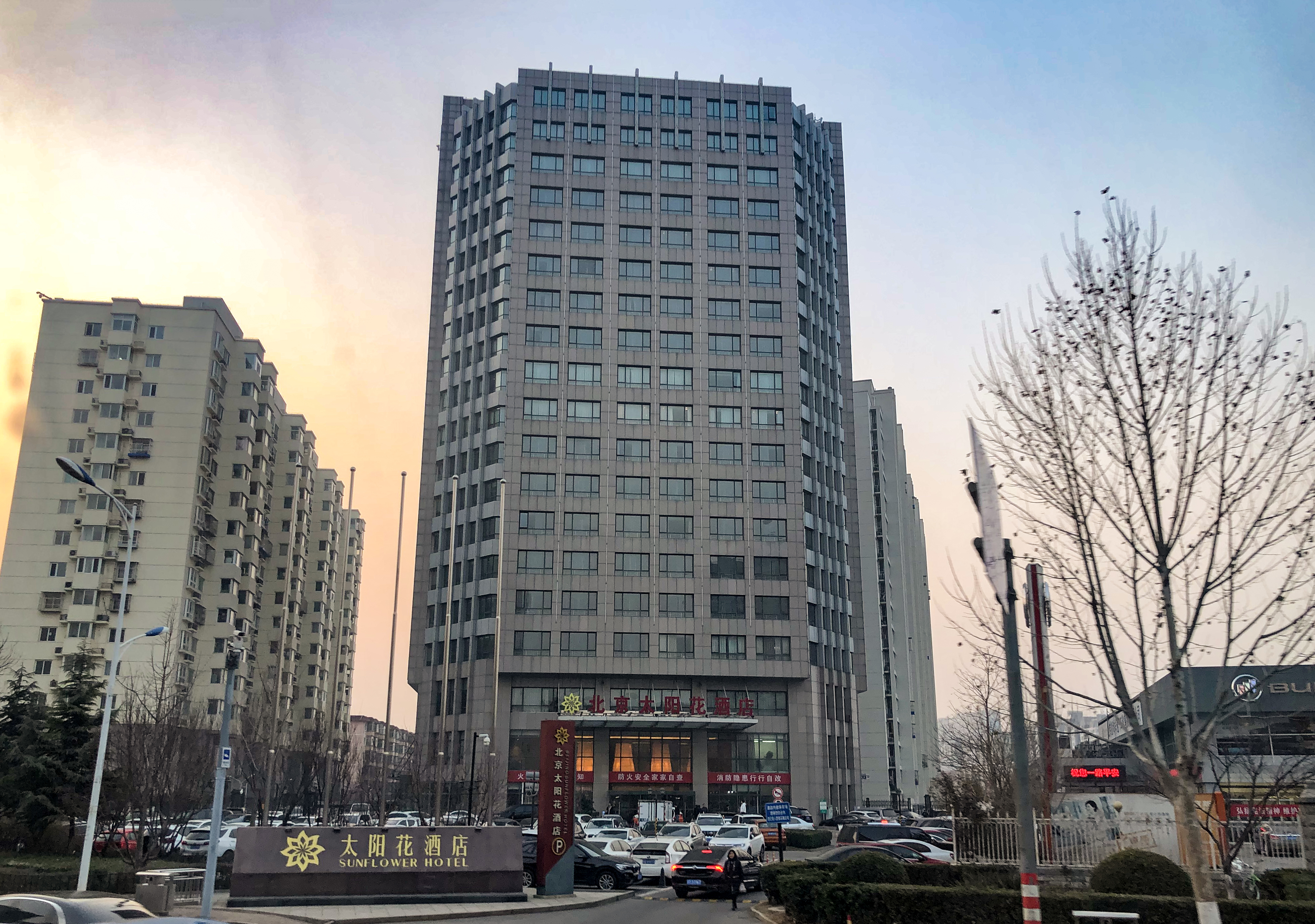
- Sunflower Hotel within the subdistrict, 2019

- Location within Beijing Location within China
- Coordinates: 39°52′41″N 116°38′35″E
- Country: China
- Municipality: Beijing
- District: Tongzhou
- Village-level Divisions: 12 communities
- Time zone: UTC+8 (China Standard)
- Postal code: 101101
- Area code: 010

Jiukeshu Subdistrict (Chinese: 九棵树街道; pinyin: Jiǔkēshù Jiēdào) is a subdistrict located at the northwest of Tongzhou District, Beijing. It borders Beiyuan Subdistrict in its north, Yuqiao and Linheli Subdistricts in its east, Liyuan Town in its south, and Heizhuanghu Township in its west.

The subdistrict was created from part of Liyuan Town in 2020.

== Administrative divisions ==
In 2021, the subdistrict was formed from 12 residential communities:

Administrative division code	Subdivision names	Name transliteration
110112010001	苏荷雅居	Suhe Yaju
110112010002	格瑞雅居	Gerui Yaju
110112010003	怡乐中街	Yiyue Zhongjie
110112010004	龙鼎园	Longdingyuan
110112010005	金侨时代家园	Jinqiao Shidai Jiayuan
110112010006	新城嘉园	Xincheng Jiayuan
110112010007	翠景北里	Cuijing Beili
110112010008	云景东里	Yunjing Dongli
110112010009	云景里	Yunjingli
110112010010	云景北里	Yunjing Beili
110112010011	翠屏北里	Cuiping Beili
110112010012	玉兰湾	Yulanwan

== See also ==
- List of township-level divisions of Beijing
