= Changping North railway station =

Railway station in Beijing, China

Changping North railway station 昌平北站
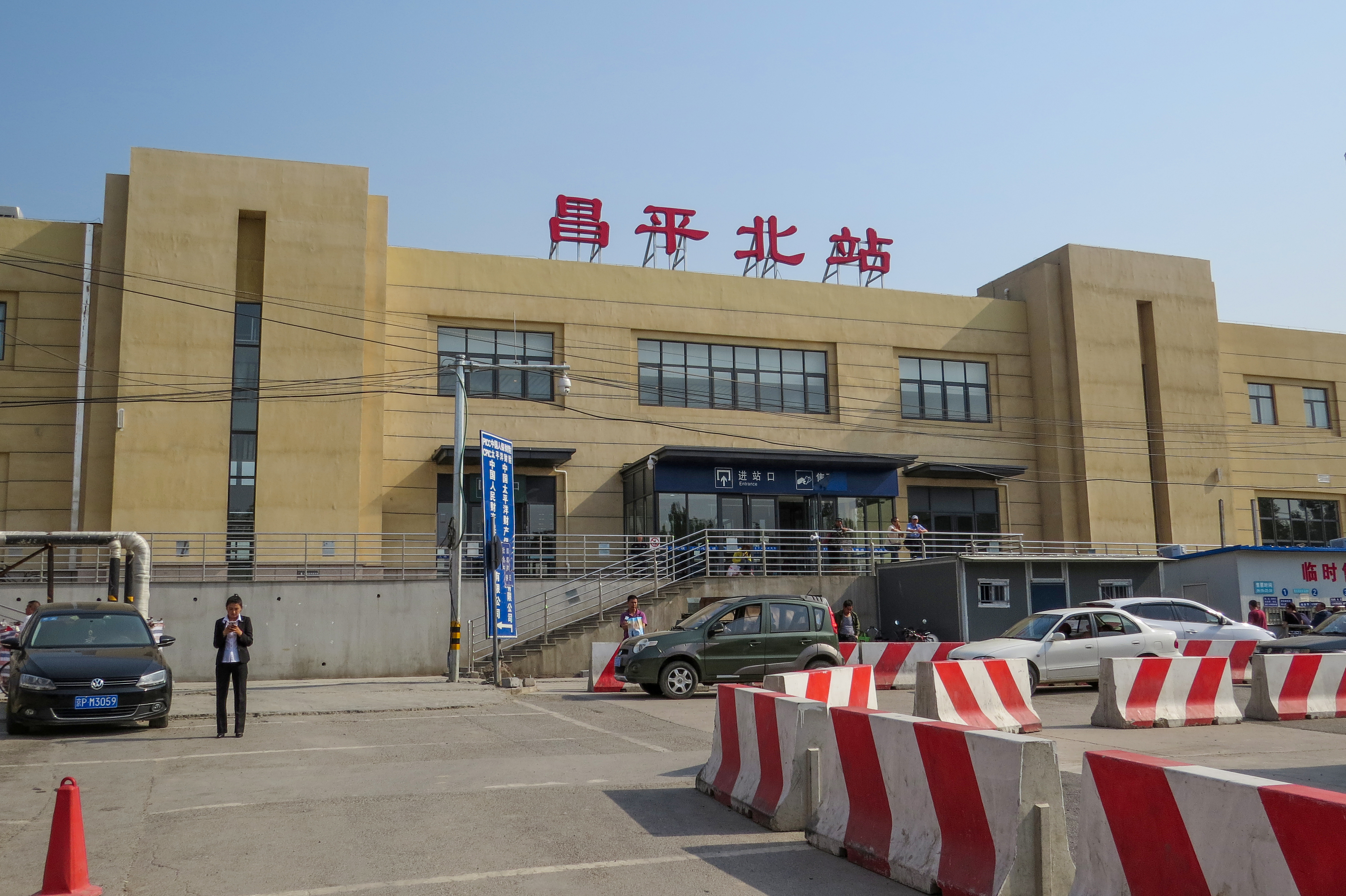
- Changpingbei railway station after renovation

General information
- Other names: Changpingbei railway station
- Location: Chengbei, Changping District, Beijing
- Coordinates: 40.2300°N 116.2271°E
- Operator: Tongzhou Train Operation Depot, China Railway Beijing Group
- Lines: Beijing–Tongliao railway; Huairou–Miyun
- Platforms: 1 side 1 island
- Connections: Changpingbei bus stop

Construction
- Structure type: at-grade

Other information
- Station code: 11609 (TMIS); VBP (telegram); CPB (pinyin)
- Classification: third

History
- Opened: 1 May 1980; 46 years ago
- Closed: 1 June 2016; 10 years ago
- Rebuilt: 1 November 2016; 9 years ago
- Electrified: estimated 1 October 2020; 5 years ago
Location
- Location within Beijing

Changping North railway station (Chinese: 昌平北站; pinyin: chāngpíng běi zhàn), also known as Changpingbei railway station, is a railway station in Gulou North Street in the urban area of Changping District, Beijing. The old station started construction in 1976 and opened on 1 May 1980, with the whole Beijing–Tongliao railway. All services were stopped between June and October in 2016 to build a new station. On 1 November 2016, the new station opened, with its waiting hall expanded to 2,987 square metres (32,150 sq ft). This station became the new terminal of all long-distance trains whose terminal used to be Beijing North railway station. On 31 December 2017, the suburban railway Huairou-Miyun line opened, and this station started to offer services for suburban railway passengers.

This new station was constructed by China Railway 6th Engineering Group from 1 June 2016 to 30 October 2016. The renovation was for sparing the old Beijing-Baotou railway to build the Beijing–Zhangjiakou intercity railway.

== See also ==
- Beijing–Baotou railway
- Beijing North railway station

Preceding station	China Railway	Following station
Changping towards Shahe	Beijing–Tongliao railway also have a link to Nankou	Guangao towards Tongliao
Preceding station	Beijing Suburban Railway	Following station
Qinghe towards Beijing North	Huairou–Miyun line	Yanqihu towards Gubeikou
