= Tongmi line =

Railway line in Beijing, China

Tongmi Line
- Tongmi
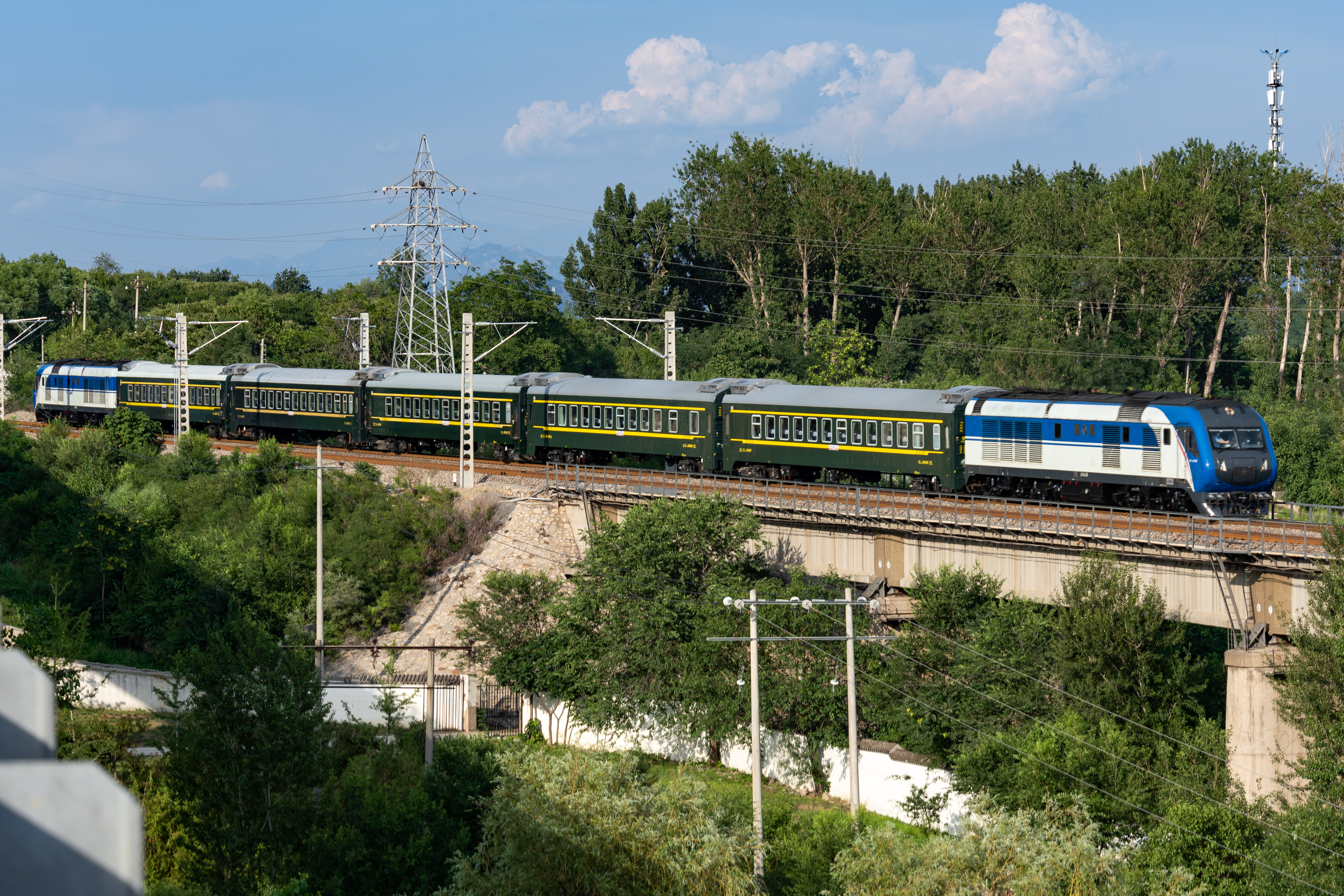
- A train on the Huairou North branch of Tongmi Line passing Beitaishang Village, Huairou District

Overview
- Other name(s): S6
- Termini: Tongzhou West; Miyun North / Huairou North
- Stations: 7

Service
- Type: Commuter rail
- System: Beijing Suburban Railway (BCR)
- Operator(s): China Railway Beijing Group

History
- Opened: June 30, 2020; 5 years ago

Technical
- Line length: 84.2 km (52.3 mi)
- Track gauge: 1,435 mm (4 ft 8 1/2 in)

Tongmi line of Beijing Suburban Railway (BCR) (Chinese: 北京市郊铁路通密线; pinyin: Běijīng Shìjiāo Tiělù Tōngmì Xiàn), formerly known as Jingcheng line, is a commuter rail line in Beijing. It opened on 30 June 2020.

The main line runs on the existing Beijing–Chengde Railway, and the branch line runs on the existing Beijing–Tongliao Railway. It runs from Tongzhou West to Miyun North (main line) or Huairou North (branch line). The line is 84.2 km (52.3 mi) in length.

== Stations ==
Service Route		Station Code	Station Name		Connections	Distance km		Location	Section
Main	Branch	Station Code	English	Chinese	Connections	Distance km		Location	Section
●	●	TAP	Tongzhou West; Tongzhouxi	通州西		0	0	Tongzhou	Beijing–Chengde Railway
●	●	SOP	Shunyi	顺义	15 (via Shimen)	24	24	Shunyi	Beijing–Chengde Railway
●	●	NLP	Niulanshan	牛栏山		13	37	Shunyi	Beijing–Chengde Railway
●	●	HRP	Huairou	怀柔		13	50	Huairou	Beijing–Chengde Railway
●	｜	MUP	Miyun North; Miyunbei	密云北		22	72	Miyun	Beijing–Chengde Railway
	●	FGP	Yanqihu	雁栖湖	Huairou–Miyun	7	57	Huairou	Beijing–Tongliao Railway
	●	HBP	Huairou North; Huairoubei	怀柔北	Huairou–Miyun	5	62	Huairou	Beijing–Tongliao Railway
