= Liangxiang railway station =

Railway station in Beijing

Liangxiang 良乡
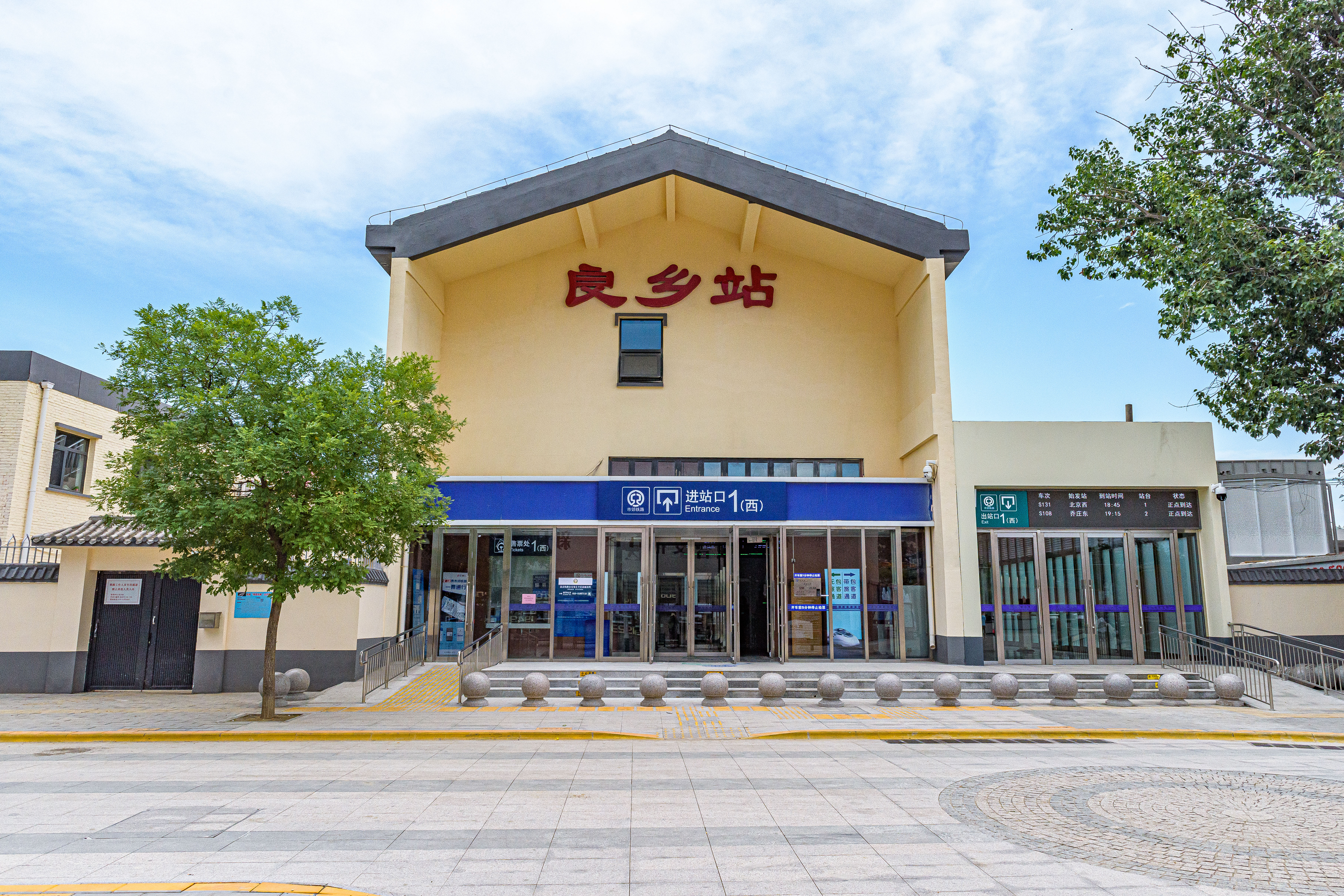
- Station building in July 2026

General information
- Location: Jingdian Rd (京电路); Liangxiang, Fangshan District, Beijing; China
- Coordinates: 39.739955°N 116.150249°E
- Owner: China Railway Beijing Group
- Lines: Beijing–Guangzhou railway Huangcun–Liangxiang railway Liangxiang–Chenjiafen railway Sub-Central line (Beijing Suburban Railway)
- Platforms: 2 island platforms
- Tracks: 10

Other information
- Station code: 20255 (TMIS code); LAP (telegraph code); LXI (pinyin code)

History
- Opened: January 1899
- Electrified: 1998

Services
Preceding station	China Railway	Following station
Houlücun towards Beijing West	Beijing–Guangzhou railway	Doudian towards Guangzhou
Changxindian towards Fengtai	Beijing–Guangzhou railway	Doudian towards Guangzhou
Preceding station	Beijing Suburban Railway	Following station
Terminus	Sub-Central line	Beijing West towards Qiaozhuang East
Location

Liangxiang railway station (simplified Chinese: 良乡站; traditional Chinese: 良鄉站; pinyin: Liángxiāng Zhàn) is a railway station in Liangxiang, Fangshan District, Beijing, China. It serves as an intermediate freight station of the Beijing–Guangzhou railway, while passenger services are provided by the Sub-Central line of Beijing Suburban Railway since 30 June 2020.

== History ==
Liangxiang railway station was opened in January 1899 as a station of Peking–Hankow railway, following the completion of its Lugouqiao-Baoding section. A coal transportation railway from Liangxiang to Tuoli was completed in July 1904. In 1954, two tracks were added to Liangxiang station following the doubling of Beijing–Hankou railway between Liangxiang and Liulihe, while the track length of Liangxiang station was extended to 850 meters. The coal railway was once defunct in 1944 and rebuilt in 1954, then extended to Cijiawu coal mines in 1970, and further extended to Chenjiafen in June 1973 to serve Da'anshan Coal Mines, thus becoming Liangxiang–Chenjiafen railway. Huangcun–Liangxiang railway, a railway branch from Liangxiang to Huangcun was completed in October 1970. The tracks of Liangxiang railway station was furthermore extended to 1,050 meters in 1994.

As the construction of Beijing West railway station began, the proposal of a connecting railway between Beijing West and Liangxiang was accepted in 1990, and construction started in 1991. This railway was opened in 1996. In May 2020, it was decided that the Sub-Central line of Beijing Suburban Railway would be extended to Liangxiang, and modifications were then implemented to the station. After the modification, suburban passenger services of Liangxiang railway station started on 30 June 2020.

== Connections ==
Liangxiang railway station is located on the eastern end of Jingdian Road (京电路), a 500-meter alley east of Haotian Street (昊天大街), the nearest major road to the station. A bus shuttle route F79 is offered from Haotian Street to the station square, but only operates before morning train departures (to railway station) or after evening train arrivals (the other way round). Bus stops for regular routes are located south of the intersection of Haotian Street and Jingdian Road, with a 500-meter distance from Liangxiang railway station.

- Beijing Bus stops:
  - Liangxiang Railway Station (良乡火车站, on Haotian St): 646, 896, 951, 971, 993, F28, F35, F79
