= Qiaozhuang East railway station =

Railway station in Beijing

Qiaozhuang East 乔庄东
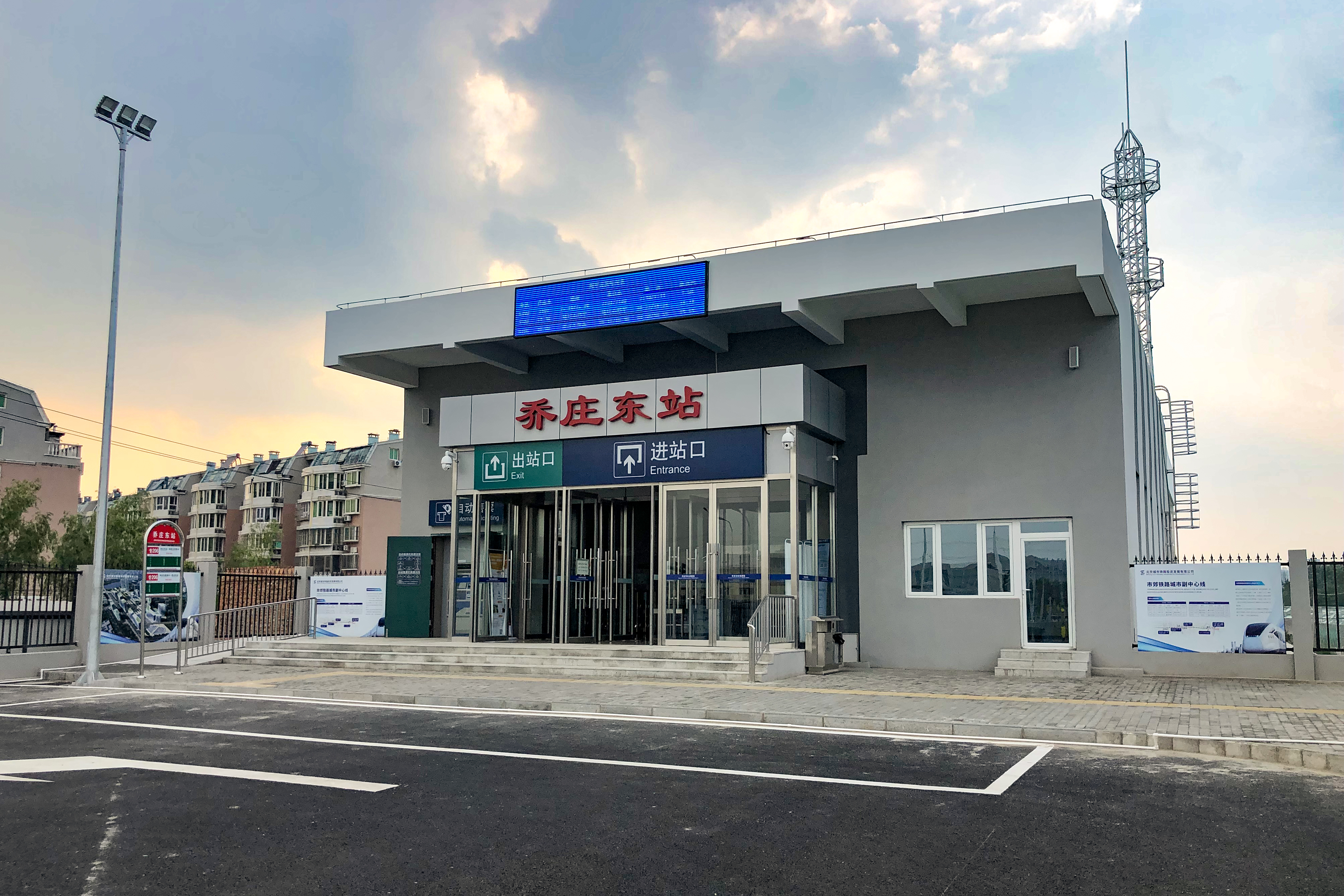
- Exterior of the station

General information
- Location: Yunhe West Street; Yuqiao Subdistrict, Tongzhou District, Beijing; China
- Coordinates: 39.89330278°N 116.6905278°E
- Owner: China Railway Beijing Group
- Line: Sub-Central line
- Platforms: 2

Other information
- Station code: 11096

History
- Opened: 20 June 2019

Services
Preceding station	Beijing Suburban Railway	Following station
Tongzhou towards Liangxiang	Sub-Central line	Terminus
Location

Qiaozhuang East railway station (Chinese: 乔庄东站; pinyin: Qiáozhuāngdōng zhàn) is a railway station on the Sub-Central line in Yuqiao Subdistrict, Tongzhou District. It is a terminus with a single island platform. The station was opened on 20 June 2019 and is situated on former railway sidings.

== Services ==
Qiaozhuang East railway station has an infrequent service to either Beijing West or Liangxiang.
