= YQH =

YQH may refer to:

- Watson Lake Airport, Yukon, Canada, IATA airport code YQH
- Yanqihu railway station, Beijing, China, Pinyin code YQH
