= Yanqihu railway station =

Railway station in Huairou, Beijing, China

Yanqihu 雁栖湖
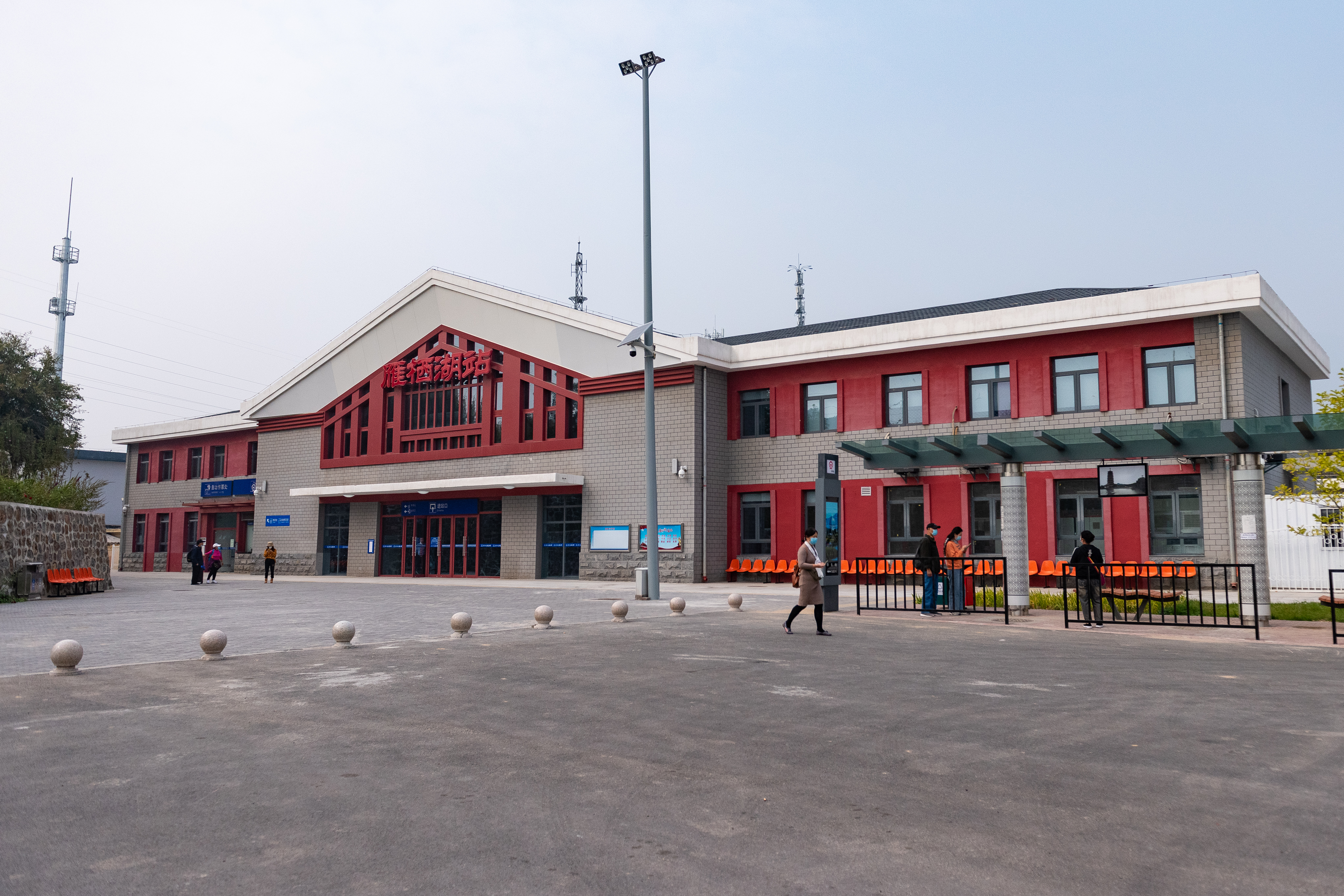
- Yanqihu railway station with newly built station square (October 2020)

General information
- Other names: Fangezhuang railway station (1976-2019)
- Location: Yanqi Subdistrict, Huairou District, Beijing
- Coordinates: 40.372713°N 116.652921°E
- Operator: Tongzhou Train Operation Depot, China Railway Beijing Group
- Lines: Beijing–Tongliao railway; Huairou–Miyun
- Platforms: 2 platforms

Construction
- Structure type: at-grade

Other information
- Station code: 11627 (TMIS); FGP (telegram); YQH (pinyin)
- Classification: third

History
- Opened: 1976; 50 years ago
- Electrified: September 2020; 5 years ago
Location
- Location within Beijing

Yanqihu railway station (Chinese: 雁栖湖站; pinyin: Yànqīhú zhàn; lit. 'Yanqi Lake railway station'), formerly known as Fangezhuang railway station (Chinese: 范各庄站; pinyin: Fàngèzhuāng zhàn) before 2019, is a railway station in Fangezhuang Village, Yanqi Subdistrict, Huairou District, Beijing. It was built in 1976 and was renamed to the current name on July 15, 2019.

The station currently serves passenger transportation, baggage and parcel consignment, and freight (including handling of complete vehicles and LTL cargo).

== See also ==
- Huairou–Miyun line
- Beijing–Baotou railway
- Beijing North railway station

Preceding station	Beijing Suburban Railway	Following station
Changping North towards Beijing North	Huairou–Miyun line	Huairou North towards Gubeikou
