= Huairou–Miyun line =

Railway line in Beijing, China

- Huairou–Miyun
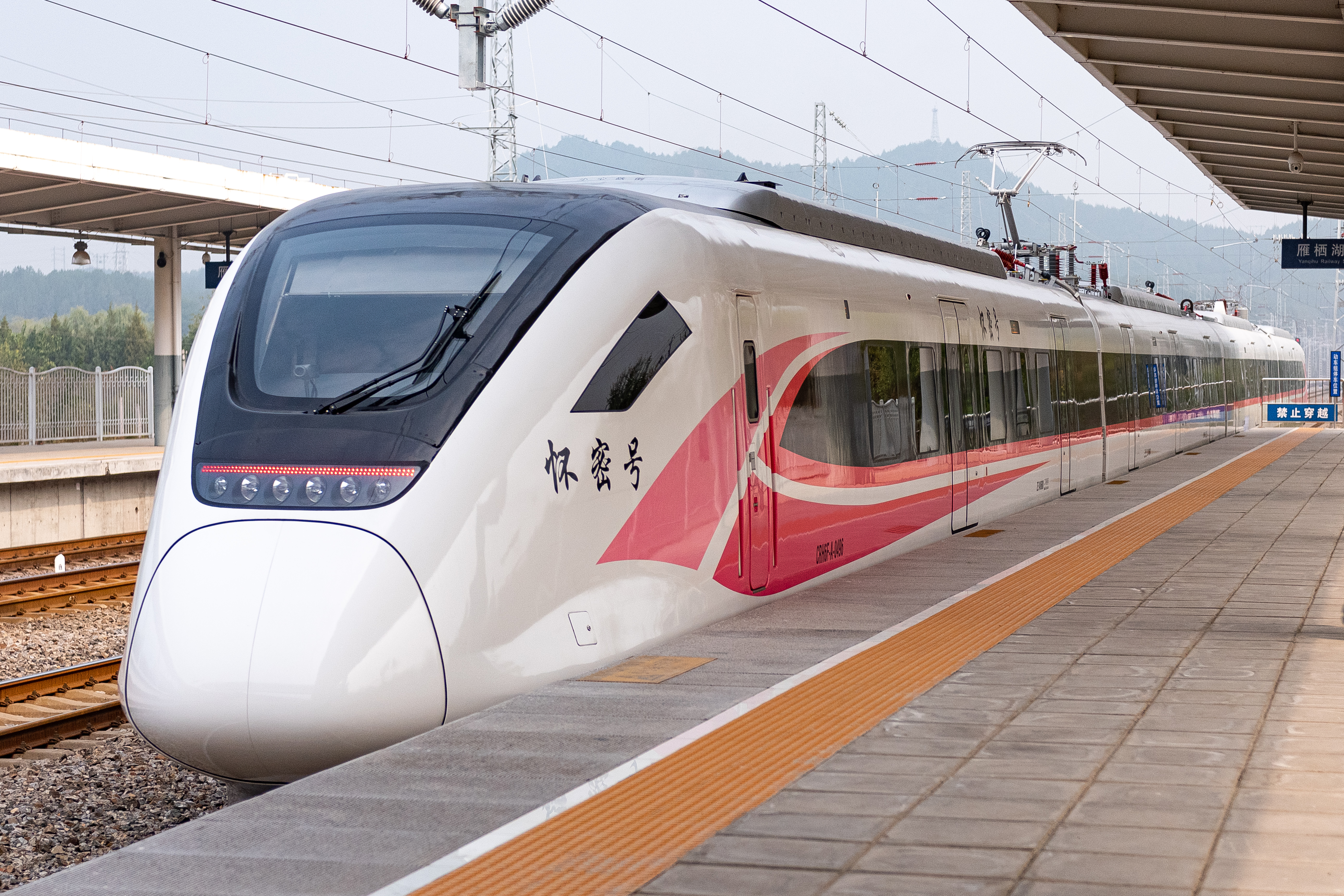
- Train S511 departing from Yanqihu railway station

Overview
- Other name(s): S5
- Status: Operational
- Termini: Beijing North; Gubeikou
- Stations: 7

Service
- Type: Commuter rail
- System: Beijing Suburban Railway (BCR)
- Operator(s): China Railway Beijing Group
- Rolling stock: CRH6F-A Huaimi Train; NDJ3 Great Wall Train (former)

History
- Opened: 31 December 2017; 7 years ago

Technical
- Line length: 144.6 km (89.9 mi)
- Track gauge: 1,435 mm (4 ft 8 1/2 in)
- Operating speed: 160 km/h (99 mph)

Huairou–Miyun Line of Beijing Suburban Railway (BCR) (Chinese: 北京市郊铁路怀柔－密云线; pinyin: Běijīng Shìjiāo Tiělù Huáiróu–Mìyún Xiàn), or Huaimi Line (Chinese: 怀密线; pinyin: Huáimì Xiàn), is a commuter rail line in Beijing. It runs from Beijing North in Xicheng District to Gubeikou in Miyun District. The line is 144.6 km (89.9 mi) in length with 7 stations.

It provides faster service to reach Beijing's two suburban districts, Huairou District and Miyun District from central Beijing.

== History ==
Changping North and Huairou North started the Huairou–Miyun line service on 31 December 2017. Yanqihu, Heishansi and Gubeikou started the Huairou–Miyun line service on April 30, 2019. The terminal of the line changed from Huangtudian to Qinghe on 30 December 2019. From August 1, 2020 to August 20, 2020, the whole line stopped service for the Beijing–Tongliao railway electrification project. Beijing North started the Huairou–Miyun line service on September 30, 2020.

== Station ==
Station №	Station Name		Connections	Distance km		Location	Section
Station №	English	Chinese	Connections	Distance km		Location	Section
VAP	Beijing North; Beijingbei	北京北	2 4 13 (via Xizhimen)	0	0	Xicheng	Jingzhang intercity railway
QIP	Qinghe	清河	13 Changping	11	11	Haidian	Jingzhang intercity railway
VBP	Changping North; Changpingbei	昌平北		27	38	Changping	Jingtong railway
FGP	Yanqi Lake; Yanqihu	雁栖湖	Tongmi	45	83	Huairou	Jingtong railway
HBP	Huairou North; Huairoubei	怀柔北	Tongmi	5	88	Huairou	Jingtong railway
HVP	Heishansi	黑山寺		15	103	Miyun	Jingtong railway
GKP	Gubeikou	古北口		42	145	Miyun	Jingtong railway

== Ticket ==
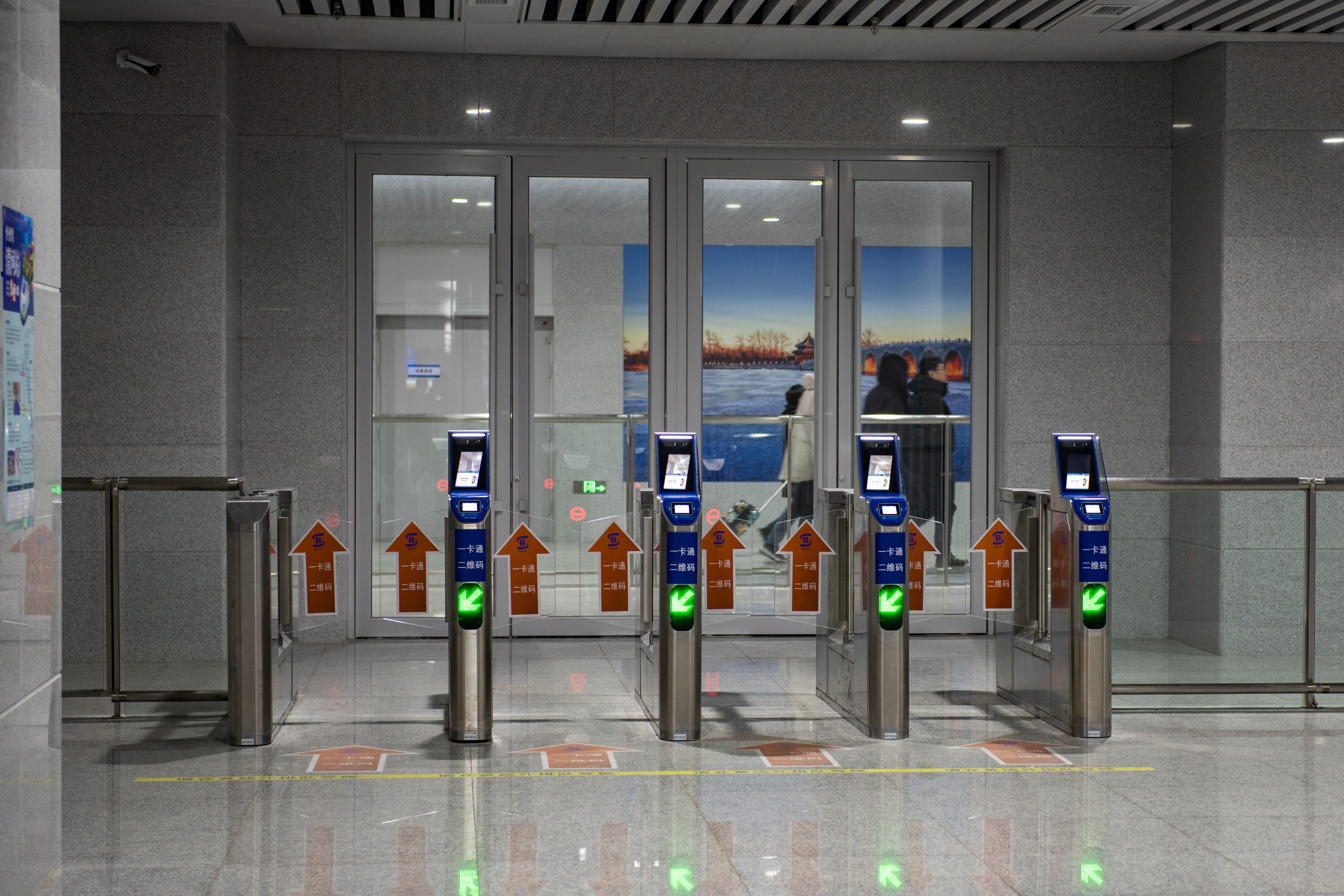
BCR card or QR code entrance of Qinghe Railway Station

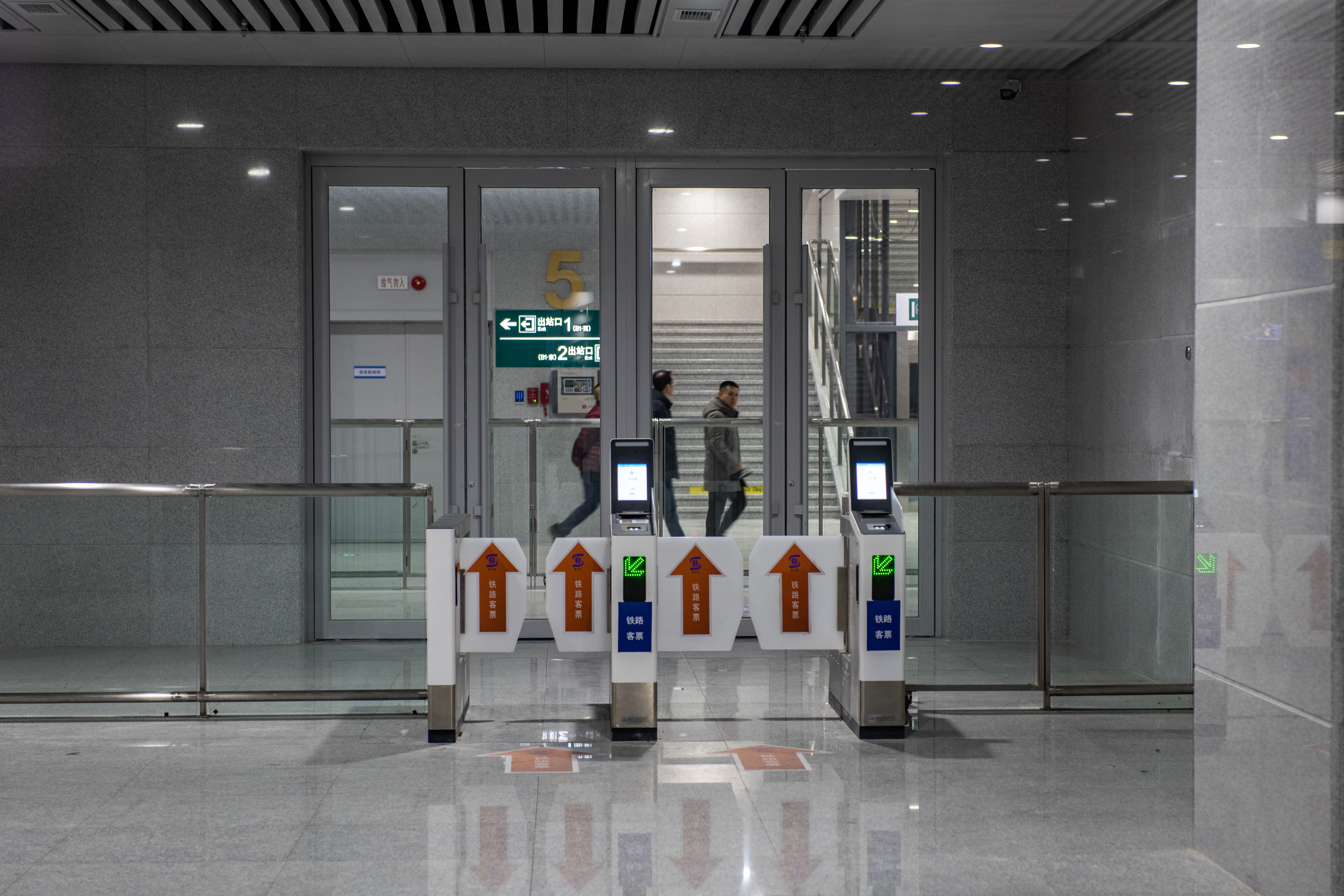
Ticket or ID document entrance of Qinghe Railway Station

The ticket pricing of the Huairou-Miyun Line is the same as that of the Beijing Subway network. For example, the ticket price of Qinghe - Gubeikou is 12 CNY. Special half-price ticket of children and disabled soldiers is sold on the 12306 website, 12306 mobile application and in all railway ticket offices. Users of Beijing Suburban Railway Card and users of the Yitongxing mobile app enjoy the same preferential policy of Beijing Subway accumulated consumption discount. Passengers have to purchase a ticket and get in the station after verifying identity documents if they purchase the tickets online or in the ticket offices. Passengers do not need to seat in number. Passengers can pay the fare by Beijing Suburban Railway Card, QR code generated by Yitongxing mobile app, an online-purchased ticket or in all China Railway ticket offices by cash, bank card, WeChat Pay or Alipay. Passengers have to swipe the traffic card or document of identification (if the ticket was purchased online) or scan the QR code while entering and leaving the stations.
