= Yuqiao Subdistrict =

Yuqiao Subdistrict 玉桥街道
- Subdistrict
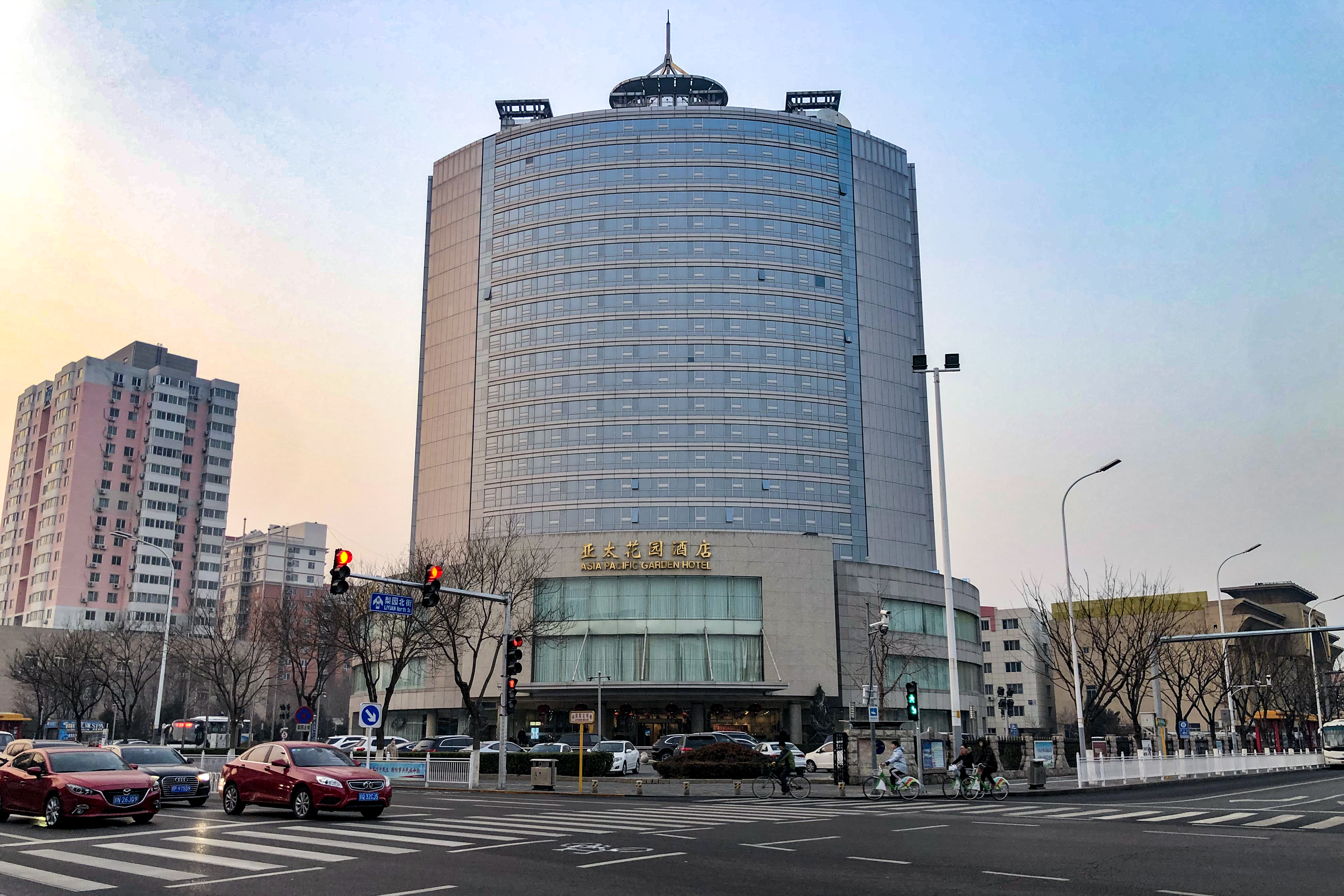
- Beijing Asia Pacific Garden Hotel, 2019

- Location within Beijing Location within China
- Coordinates: 39°53′33″N 116°40′30″E
- Country: China
- Municipality: Beijing
- District: Tongzhou
- Village-level Divisions: 18 communities

Area
  - Total: 10.38 km^{2} (4.01 sq mi)

Population (2020)
  - Total: 115,813
  - Density: 11,160/km^{2} (28,900/sq mi)
- Time zone: UTC+8 (China Standard)
- Postal code: 101101
- Area code: 010

Yuqiao Subdistrict (Chinese: 玉桥街道; pinyin: Yùqiáo Jiēdào) is a subdistrict located on northern part of Tongzhou District, Beijing. It borders Zhongcang and Tongyun Subdistricts to its north, Yongshun Town to its east, Zhangjiawan Town to its southeast, Liyuan Town to its southwest, and Beiyuan Subdistrict to its northwest. The population of the subdistrict was 115,813 as of the 2020 census.

== History ==
In 1948, four townships under Tongxian were merged into the newly created Tongzhou City. The city was changed ro Tongzhou town in 1950. In 1997, It was disbanded, and Yuqiao Subdistrict was formed on land that was previously Yunhe Subdistrict of Tongzhou Town.

== Administrative divisions ==
As of 2021, Yuqiao Subdistrict had direct jurisdiction over 18 communities:

Administrative division code	Subdivision names	Name transliteration
110112004002	葛布店北里	Gebudian Beili
110112004003	葛布店南里	Gebudian Nanli
110112004004	玉桥北里	Yuqiao Beili
110112004006	玉桥南里	Yuqiao Nanli
110112004009	运河东大街	Yunhedong Dajie
110112004011	乔庄北街	Qiaozhuang Beijie
110112004012	梨花园	Lihuayuan
110112004014	艺苑西里	Yiyuan Xili
110112004015	玉桥东里	Yuqiao Dongli
110112004016	柳岸方园	Liu'an Fangyuan
110112004017	柳馨园	Liuxinyuan
110112004018	玉桥南里南	Yuqiao Nanli Nan
110112004020	新通国际	Xintong Guoji
110112004021	玉桥东里南	Yuqiao Dongli Nan
110112004023	运乔嘉园	Yunqiao Jiayuan
110112004024	艺苑东里	Yiyuan Dongli
110112004025	葛布店东里	Gebudian Dongli
110112004026	梨园东里	Liyuan Dongli

== Gallery ==
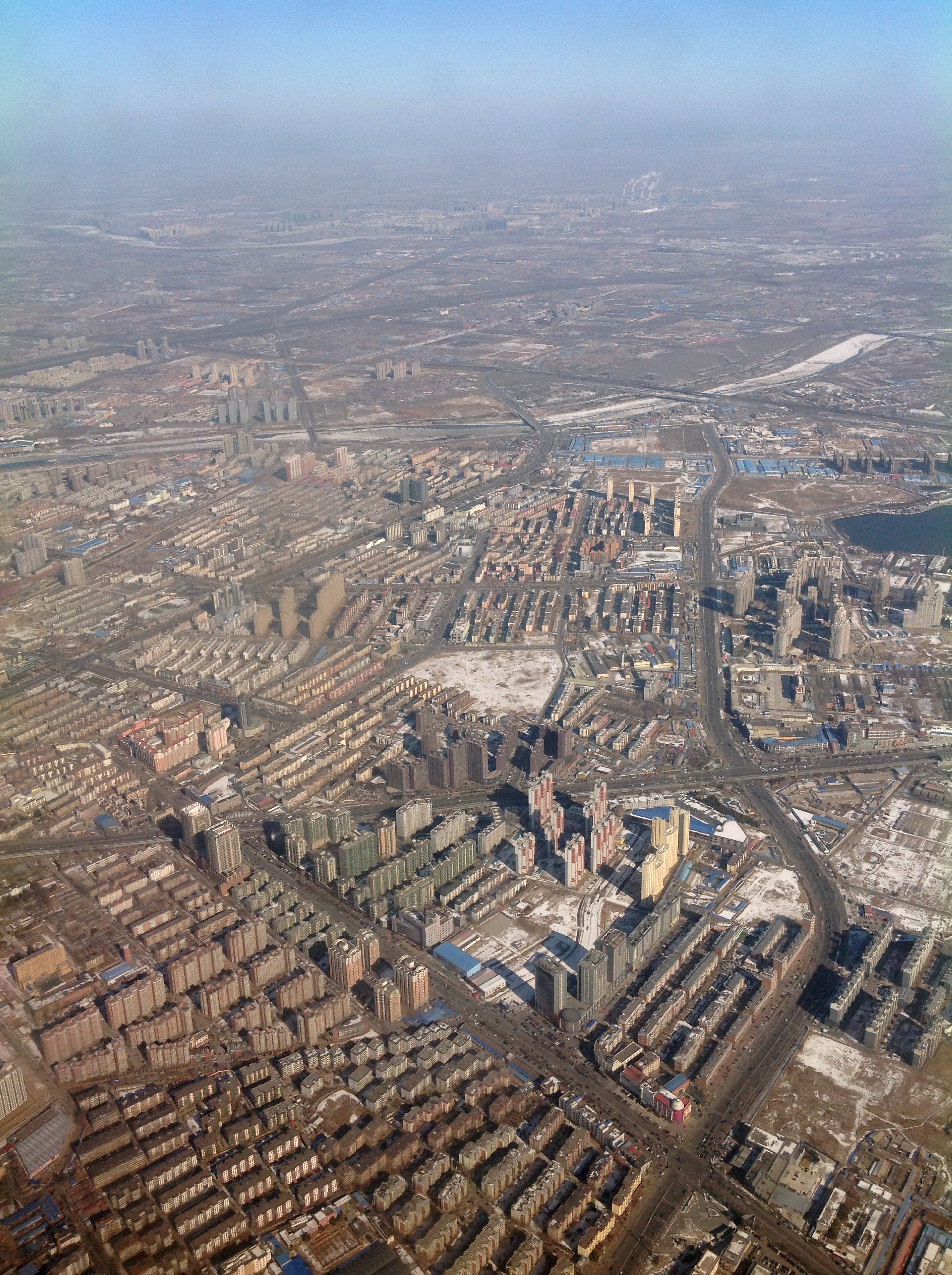
Aerial view of Liyuan, 2013

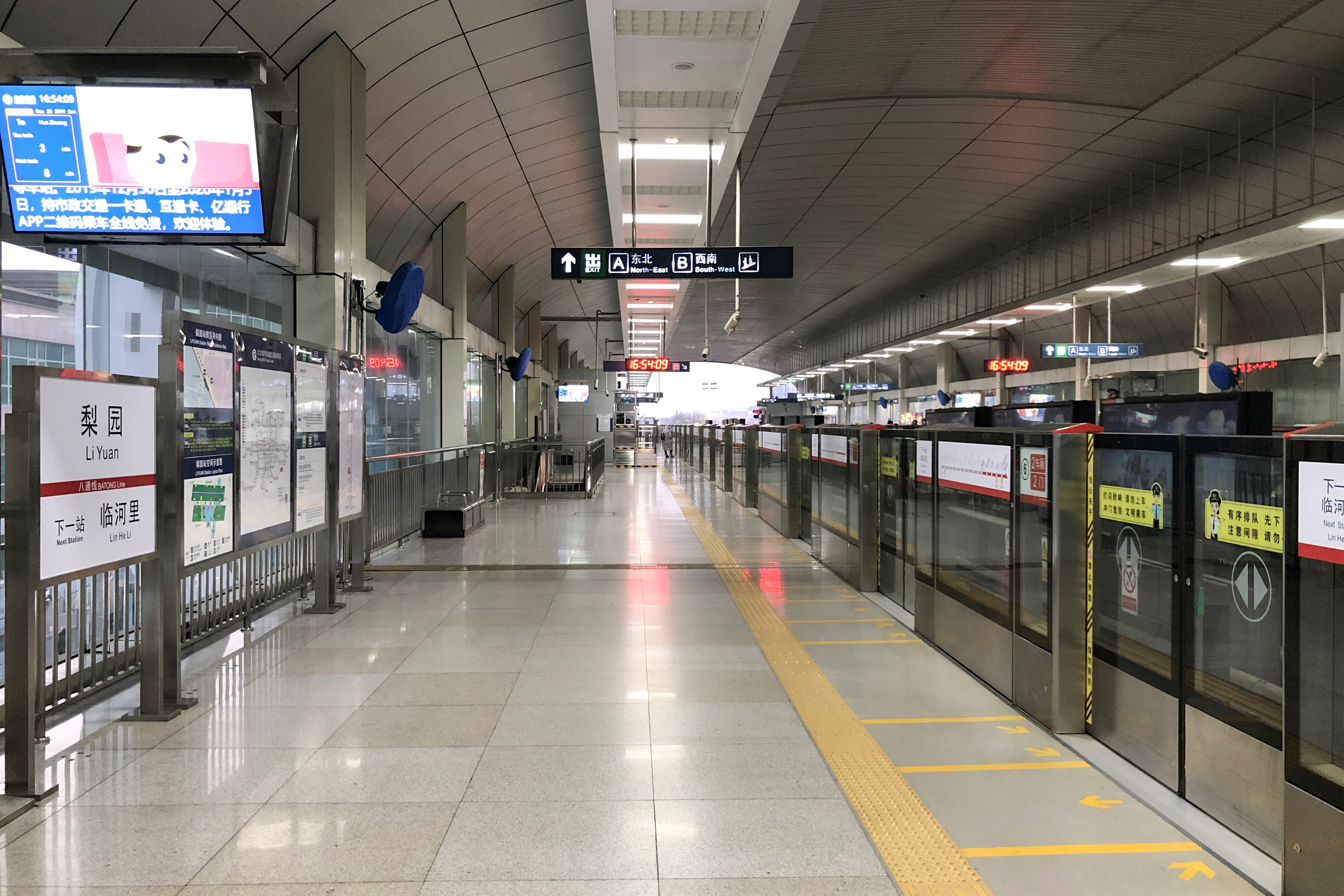
Eastbound platform of Liyuan station, 2019

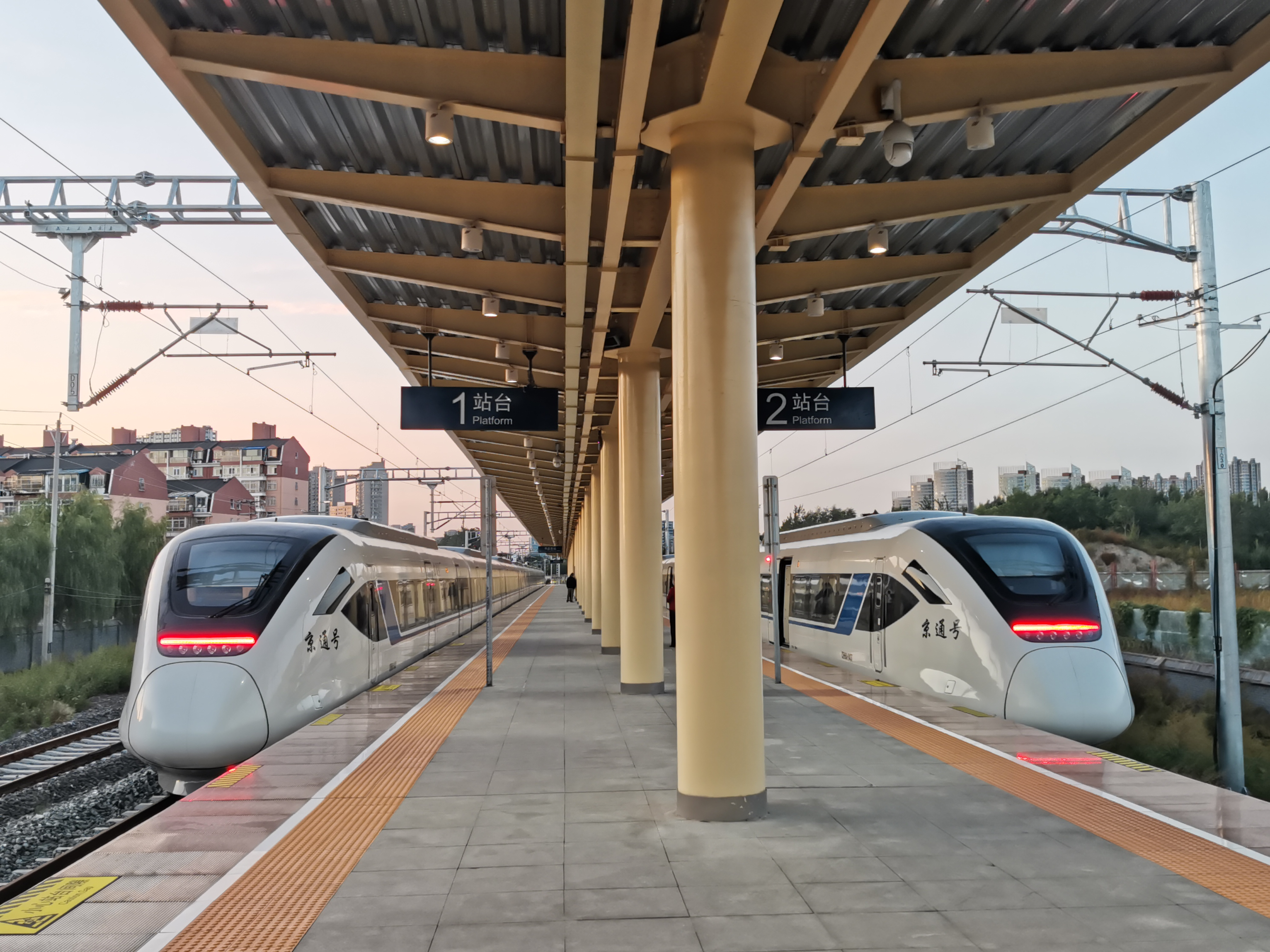
Qiaozhuangdong railway station, 2020

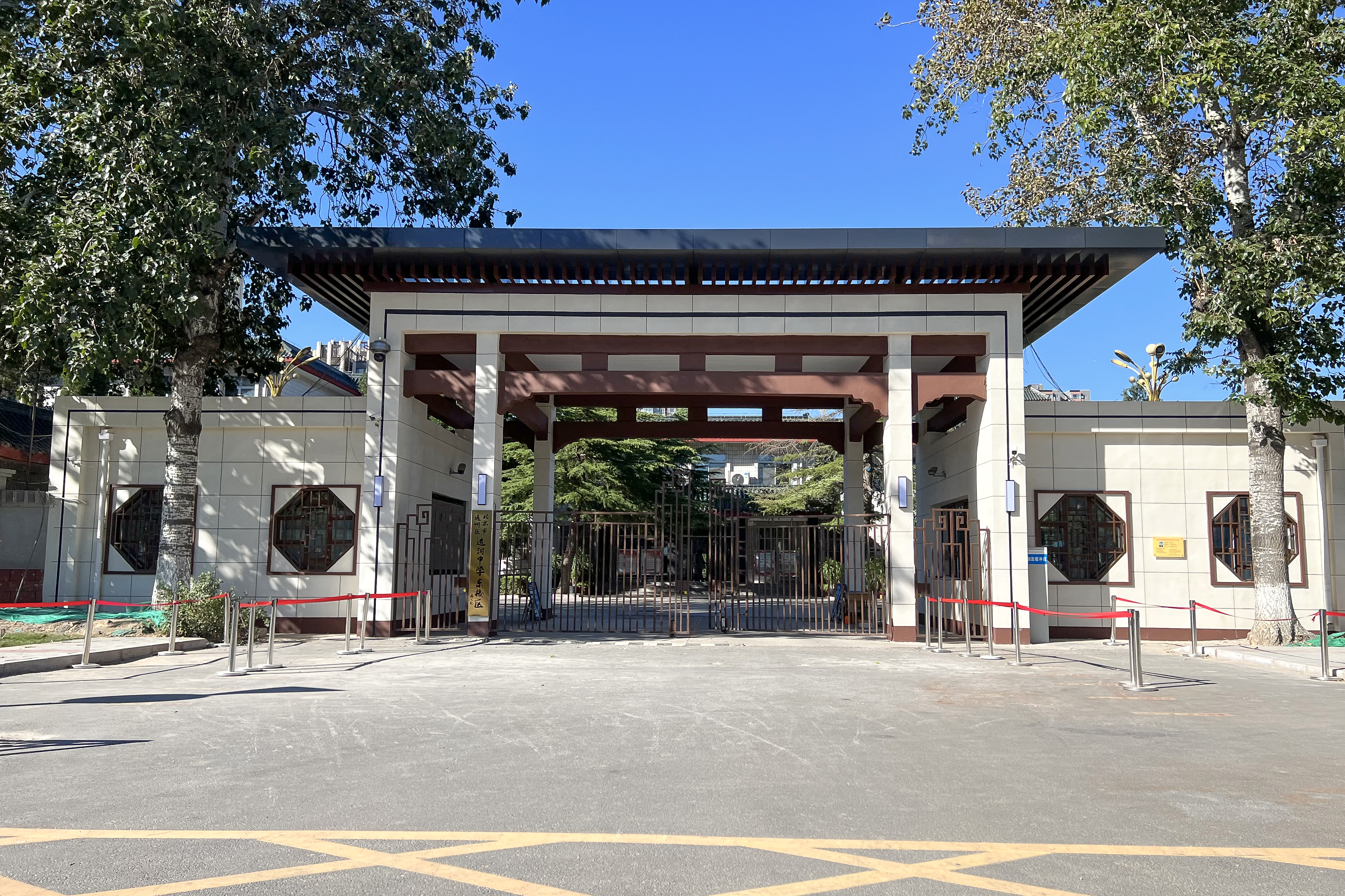
East campus of Beijing Yunhe Middle School, 2022

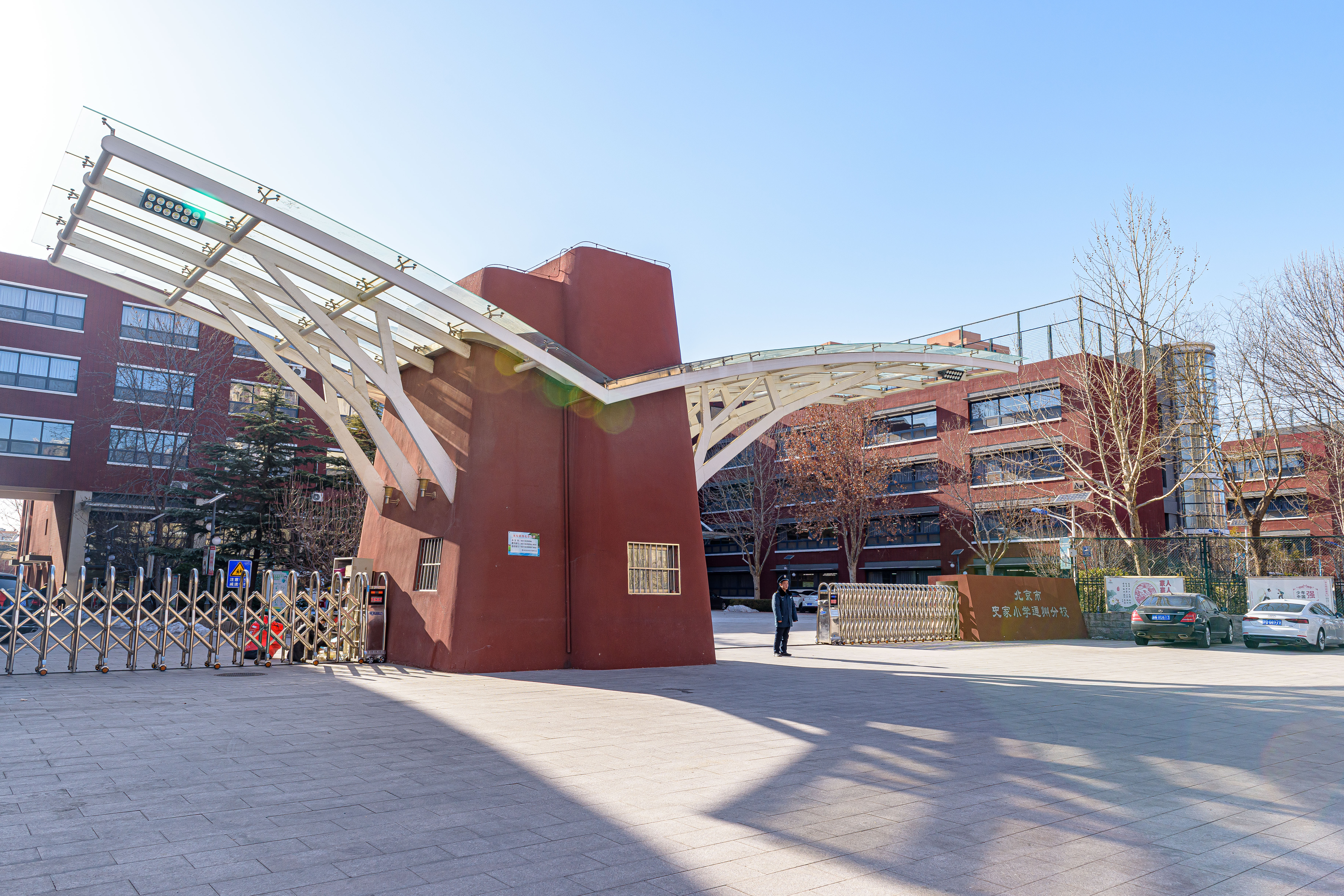
Shijia Primary School Tongzhou branch, 2024

== See also ==
- List of township-level divisions of Beijing
