= Sub-Center line =

Commuter rail service in Beijing, China

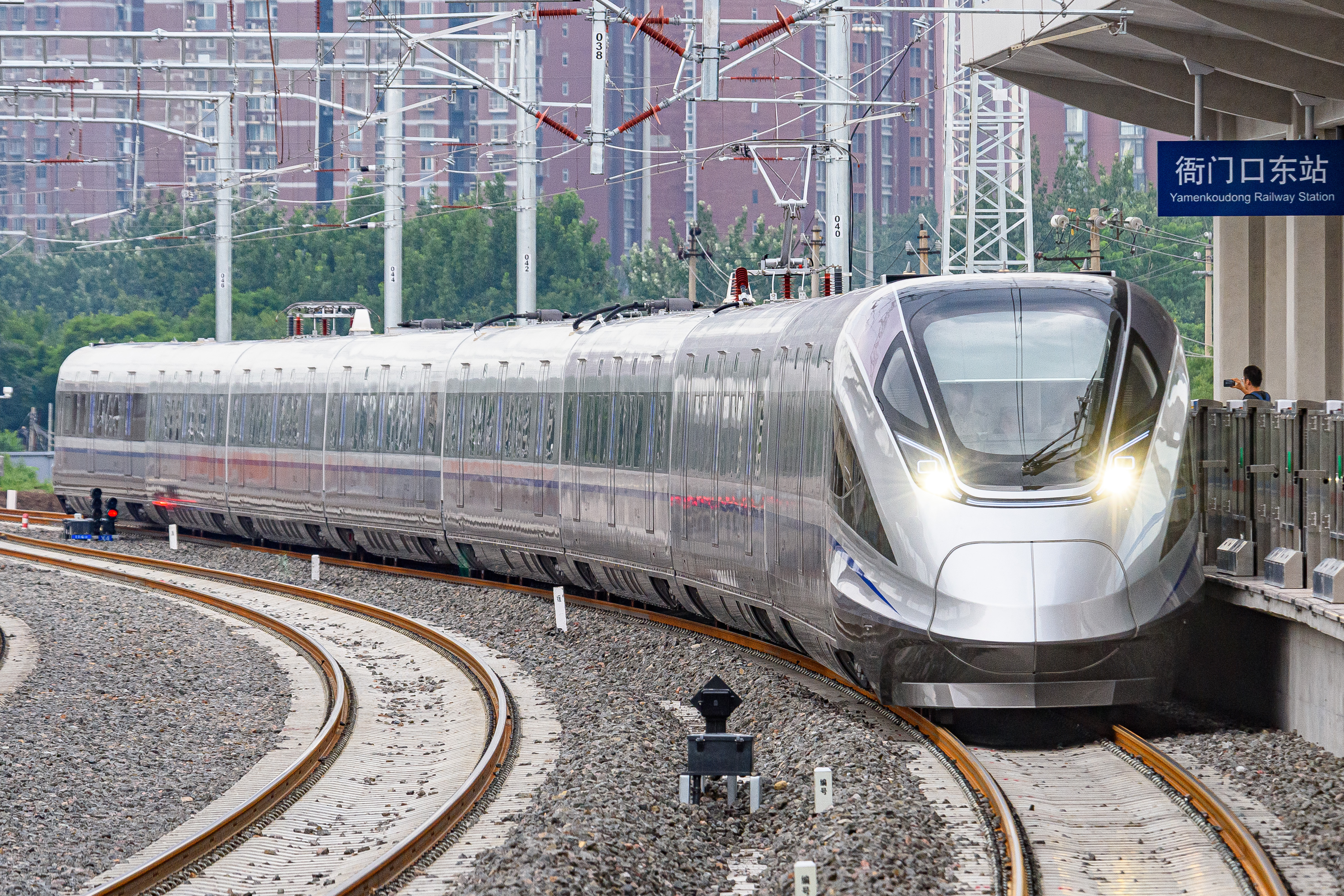
- Train of the Sub-Center line entering Yamenkoudong station in July 2026

Overview
- Other name: S1
- Status: Operational
- Termini: Liangxiang; Qiaozhuang East
- Stations: 9

Service
- Type: Commuter rail
- System: Beijing Suburban Railway (BCR)
- Operator: China Railway Beijing Group
- Rolling stock: CRH6

History
- Opened: 31 December 2017; 8 years ago

Technical
- Line length: 63.7 km (39.6 mi)
- Track gauge: 1,435 mm (4 ft 8 1/2 in)

Sub-Center line (Note: also Sub City Center line, City Sub-Center line or Sub-Cental line) of Beijing Suburban Railway (BCR) (Chinese: 北京市郊铁路城市副中心线; pinyin: Běijīng Shìjiāo Tiělù Chéngshì Fù Zhōngxīn Xiàn) is a commuter rail line in Beijing. It runs from Liangxiang railway station in Fangshan District to Qiaozhuang East railway station in Tongzhou District. It provides faster service to reach Beijing's sub-administrative center in Tongzhou from central Beijing. The line is currently 63.7 km (39.6 mi) in length with 9 stations.

== History ==
Beijing West, Beijing, Beijing East, and Zhongcang (formerly named as Tongzhou) started the Sub-Center line service on 31 December 2017. Qiaozhuang East started the Sub-Center line service on 20 June 2019. Liangxiang started the Sub-Center line service on 30 June 2020.

== Stations ==
3 infill stations between Liangxiang and Beijing West are opened on 1 July 2026.

Station №	Station Name		Connections	Distance km		Location	Section
Station №	English	Chinese	Connections	Distance km		Location	Section
LAP	Liangxiang	良乡		0	0	Fangshan	Jingguang railway
	Fangshan East; Fangshandong	房山东		-	-	Fangshan	Jingguang railway
	Houlücun	后吕村	1 Branch (U/C)	-	-	Fengtai	Jingguang railway
	Yamenkou East; Yamenkoudong	衙门口东		－	－	Shijingshan	Jingguang railway
BXP	Beijing West; Beijingxi	北京西	7 9 Jingguang Jingxiong	31	31	Fengtai	Beijing underground cross-city railway
BJP	Beijing	北京	2	9	40	Dongcheng	Beijing underground cross-city railway
BOP	Beijing East; Beijingdong	北京东		5	45	Chaoyang	Jingha railway
TOP	Zhongcang	中仓		15	60	Tongzhou	Jingha railway
QEP	Qiaozhuang East; Qiaozhuangdong	乔庄东		3	63	Tongzhou	Tongqiao railway

== Timetable ==
Timetable was effective from 1 July 2026.

Timetable for train to Qiaozhuang East
Train number	Liangxiang	Fangshan East	Houlücun	Yamenkou East	Beijing West	Beijing	Beijing East	Zhongcang	Qiaozhuang East
S101	6:26	6:31/32	—	—	6:55/57	7:11/12	—	7:31/32	7:41
S103	6:44	6:49/50	—	—	7:14/16	7:30/32	—	7:51	
S105	7:04	7:09/10	7:19/20	7:30/31	7:42/48	8:02/06	—	—	8:30
S122	7:33	7:38/39	7:48/49	7:59/8:00	8:10	—	—	—	—
S124	7:59	8:04/05	8:14/15	8:25/26	8:37	—	—	—	—
S126	8:47	8:52/53	9:02/03	9:13/14	9:24	—	—	—	—
S128	10:43	10:48/49	10:58/59	11:09/10	11:21	—	—	—	—
S107	12:40	12:45/46	12:55/56	13:06/07	13:17/20	13:35/39	—	13:58/59	14:08
S130	13:37	13:42/43	13:52/53	14:03/04	14:15	—	—	—	—
S132	15:34	15:39/40	15:49/50	16:00/01	16:12	—	—	—	—
S109	17:28	17:33/34	17:43/44	17:54/18:04	18:15/17	18:31/35	—	18:54/19:02	19:10
S111	19:07	19:12/13	19:22/23	19:33/34	19:46/20:00	20:14/16	20:25/27	20:40/42	20:51
S134	19:32	19:37/38	19:47/48	19:58/59	20:10	—	—	—	—

Timetable for train to Liangxiang
Train number	Qiaozhuang East	Zhongcang	Beijing East	Beijing	Beijing West	Yamenkou East	Houlücun	Fangshan East	Liangxiang
S102	5:58	6:07/09	—	6:30/31	6:45/47	—	—	7:11/12	7:17
S104	7:08	7:17/19	7:32/33	7:44/45	7:59/8:01	—	—	8:25/26	8:31
S121	—	—	—	—	8:58	9:09/10	9:19/20	9:30/31	9:36
S123	—	—	—	—	11:41	11:52/53	12:02/03	12:13/14	12:19
S106	11:59	12:08/09	12:23/24	12:35/37	12:52/54	13:05/06	13:15/16	13:26/27	13:32
S125	—	—	—	—	14:40	14:51/52	—	15:08/09	15:14
S127	—	—	—	—	16:32	—	16:49/50	17:00/01	17:06
S129	—	—	—	—	17:35	17:46/47	17:56/57	18:07/08	18:13
S131	—	—	—	—	18:11	18:22/23	—	18:39/40	18:45
S108	17:53	—	—	18:17/19	18:33/37	18:48/49	18:58/59	19:09/10	19:15
S110	18:27	—	18:45/46	18:56/58	19:12/14	—	—	—	19:41
S112	—	19:02	—	19:21/22	19:36/38	19:49/50	—	20:06/07	20:12
S133	—	—	—	—	20:50	21:01/02	21:12/13	21:23/24	21:29
