= Xinmin–Tongliao high-speed railway =

High speed rail line in China

Xinmin–Tongliao high-speed railway 新通客运专线

Overview
- Status: Operating
- Termini: Xinmin East; Tongliao

Service
- Operator(s): China Railway High-speed

Technical
- Line length: 197 km (122 mi)
- Track gauge: 1,435 mm (4 ft 8 1/2 in)
- Operating speed: 250 km/h (155 mph)

The Xinmin–Tongliao high-speed railway is a high-speed railway in China. Opened on 29 December 2018, it is the first high-speed railway to cross into Inner Mongolia.

== Route ==
The south-to-north line is 197 kilometres (122 mi) long and has a design speed of 250 kilometres per hour (160 mph). At its southern terminus are connections to the Beijing–Shenyang high-speed railway in both east and west directions.

== Stations ==
| Station Name | Chinese |
|---|---|
| Xinminbei (Xinmin North) | 新民北 |
| Zhangwu | 彰武 |
| Ganjig | 甘旗卡 |
| Tongliao | 通辽 |
