= Beijing–Tongliao railway =

Railway line in China

Beijing–Tongliao Railway
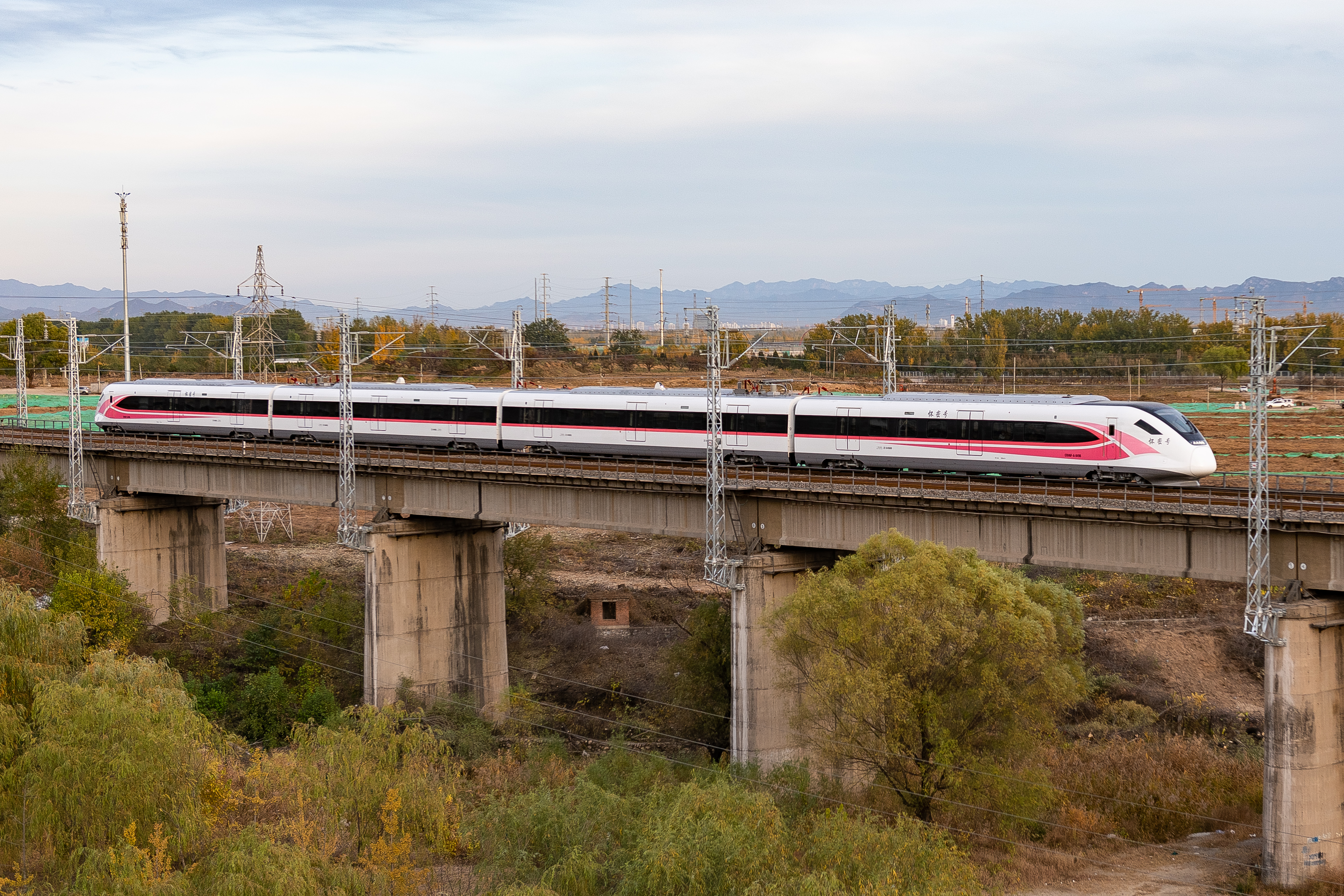
- A CRH6F-A of BCR Huairou–Miyun line on the electrified Beijing–Tongliao Railway in Huairou District, Beijing

Overview
- Native name: 京通铁路
- Status: In operation
- Termini: Changping; Tongliao
- Stations: 63

Service
- Operator(s): China Railway
- Depot(s): Huairou North locomotive depot (CR Beijing); Tongliao locomotive depot (CR Shenyang)

History
- Opened: 1 May 1980

Technical
- Line length: 804 km (500 mi)
- Number of tracks: 1
- Track gauge: 1,435 mm (4 ft 8 1/2 in) standard gauge
- Electrification: Overhead lines, AC 25 KV 50 Hz (except Longhua-Chifeng section)
- Operating speed: 110 km/h (68 mph)

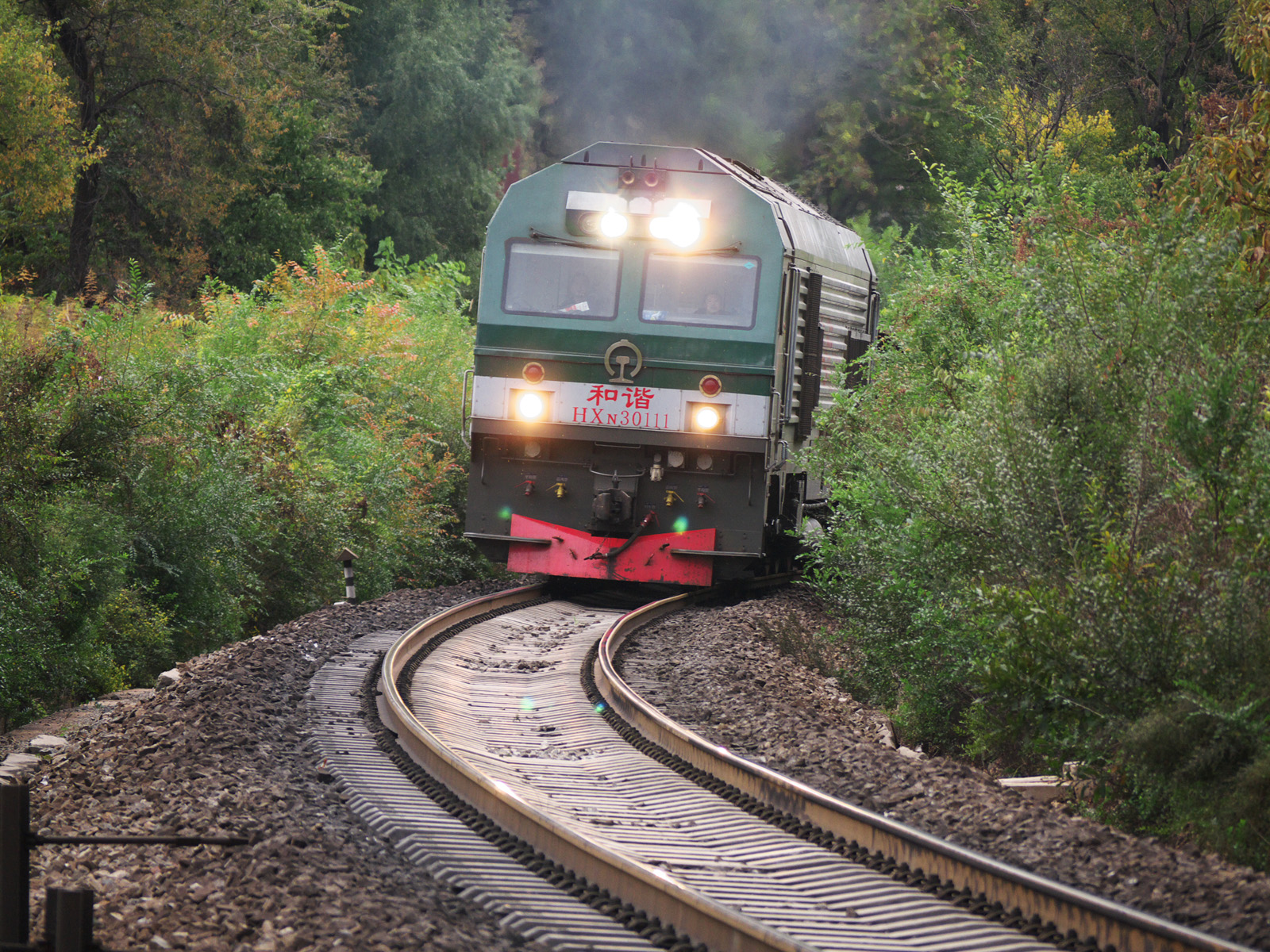
An HXN3 locomotive on the Jingtong railway in Huairou District, Beijing

The Beijing–Tongliao or Jingtong railway (simplified Chinese: 京通铁路; traditional Chinese: 京通鐵路; pinyin: jīngtōng tiělù), also known as the Shahe–Tongliao or Shatong railway, is a railroad in northern China between Beijing, the national capital, and Tongliao in the Inner Mongolia Autonomous Region. The line is 804 km (500 mi) long and runs northwest from Beijing Municipality through Hebei Province to southeastern Inner Mongolia. The line was built between 1972 and 1977, and entered into operation in 1980. Major cities and counties along the route include Beijing, Luanping, Longhua, Chifeng and Tongliao.

== History ==
The building of the Beijing–Tongliao railway began in October 1972 and was divided into three phases. The construction planning phase took one and a half years. The main construction took four years and was completed on December 12, 1977. The final phase to prepare the line for commercial operation took another two and a half years. The line officially opened on May 1, 1980. At the height of construction, more than 200,000 workers participated in the project.

At the time of its construction, the railway was notable for being the second rail line, after the Beijing–Harbin (Jingha) railway, to traverse the Great Wall and connect northern and northeastern China. Whereas the Jingha Line skirts the coast, the Jingtong line runs inland through the rugged Yan Mountains. The Jingtong railway has 116 tunnels that are collectively 78 km (48 mi) in length, including the 5,848 m (19,186 ft) Red Flag Tunnel. The line also has 450 bridges that are 45 km (28 mi) in total length, the longest of which, the Laoha River Grand Bridge in Chifeng, at 1,447 m (4,747 ft) set a record length in China. In all bridges and tunnels account for 15% of the line's total length.

== Route ==
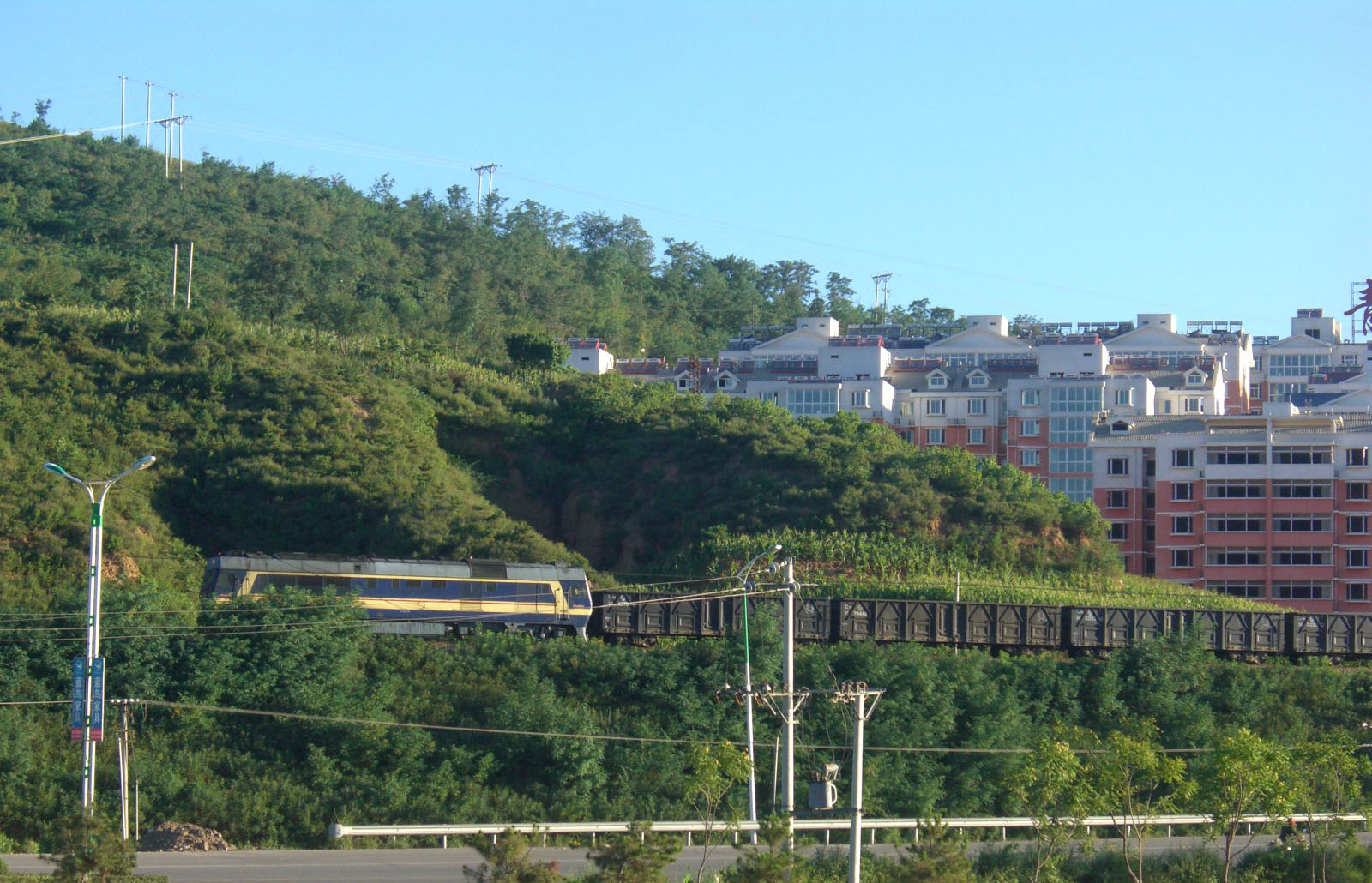
The Beijing–Tongliao railway at Luanping, Hebei

In Beijing, the Jingtong line begins at Changping North Railway Station, in suburban Changping District north of the city. At Changping North Station, the lines branches off of the Beijing–Baotou railway and then heads northeast through Huairou and Miyun Districts and leaves the city at Gubeikou Pass in the Yan Mountains. The line continues north through Luanping and Longhua counties of Hebei Province before reaching Chifeng in Inner Mongolia. From Chifeng, the line runs northeast following National Highway 111 across the Zhelimu Desert to Tongliao. The main line is 804 km (500 mi) long with 86 stations. Including connection lines to the Beijing-Chengde and Shenyang-Chengde railways, the Beijing–Tongliao railway has a total track length of 870 km (541 mi).

=== Rail Junctions ===
- Changping North: Beijing–Baotou railway
- Tongliao: Jining–Tongliao railway; Tongliao–Ranghulu railway

== See also ==
- List of railways in China
- Rail transport in Inner Mongolia
