= China Railway CRH6 =

Chinese regional/commuter higher-speed train

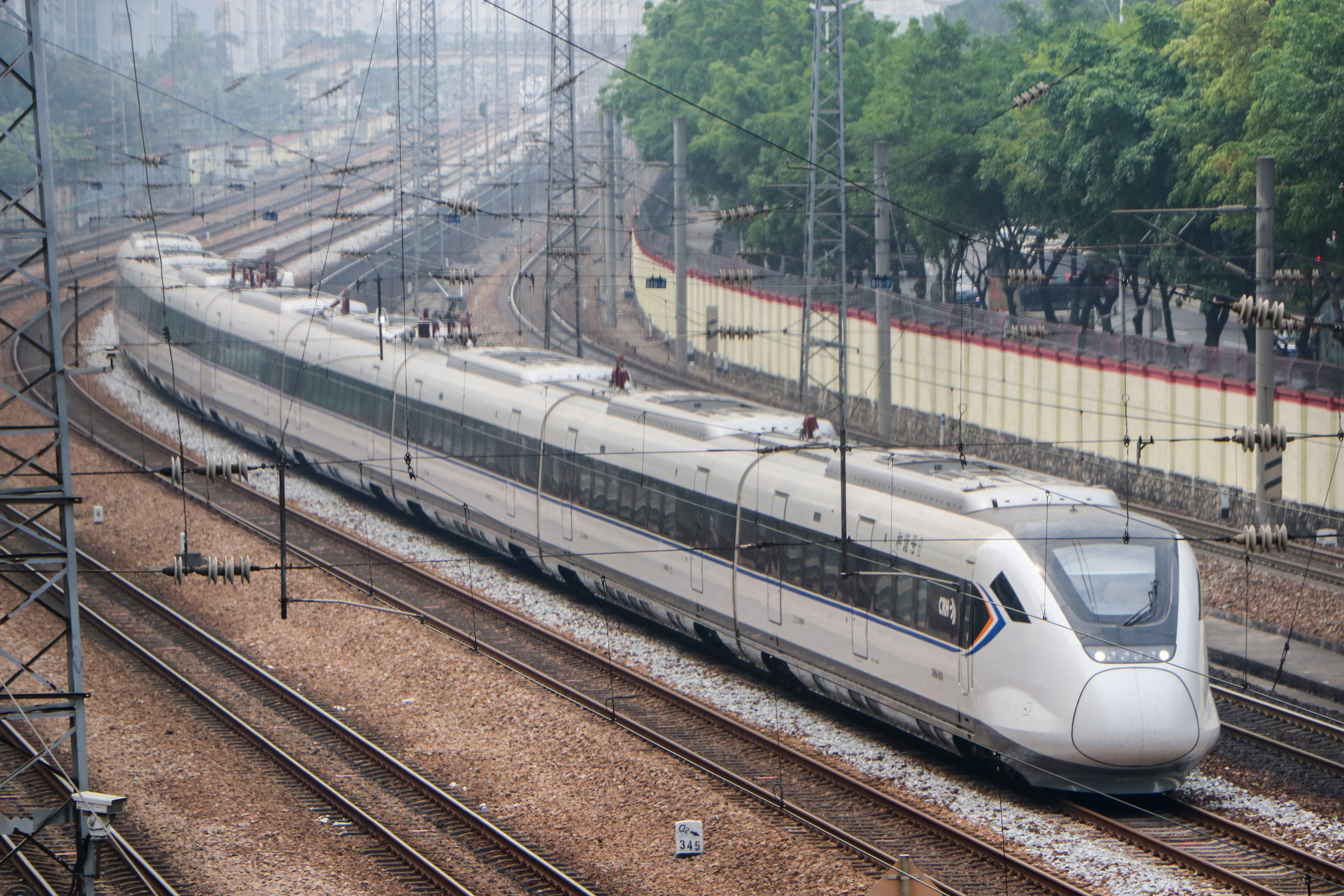
- CRH6A at Guangzhou–Shenzhen railway
- In service: 2014–present
- Manufacturer: CRRC Qingdao Sifang
- Built at: CRRC Guangdong Jiangmen Rail Transit Vehicles
- Number built: 24 trainsets (192 cars)
- Formation: 8 cars per trainset (4M4T)
- Capacity: High-speed version: 586 seating / 1506 max Higher-speed version: 1545 standard / 2110 max
- Operators: China Railway; formerly Chinese Ministry of Railways

Specifications
- Train length: 199.5 m (654 ft 6 in)
- Width: 3,300 mm (10 ft 10 in)
- Height: 3,860 mm (12 ft 8 in)
- Platform height: 1,250 mm (4 ft 1 in)
- Maximum speed: High-speed version: 200 km/h (124 mph); Semi high-speed version: 180 km/h (112 mph)
- Traction system: IGBT VVVF inverter control (Zhuzhou CSR Times Electric)
- Transmission: AC-DC-AC
- Power supply: Overhead catenary
- Electric system: 25 kV 50 Hz AC
- Braking systems: Regenerative, electronically controlled pneumatic brakes
- Track gauge: 1,435 mm (4 ft 8 1/2 in) standard gauge

The CRH6 is a regional/commuter higher-speed train of the People's Republic of China. It is designed by CRRC Qingdao Sifang and will be manufactured by CRRC Nanjing Puzhen at its subsidiary, the CRRC Guangdong Jiangmen Factory. Unlike other CRH types, most CRH6 trains use unique names; only very few CRH6 use Hexie (Chinese: 和谐号; pinyin: Héxié hào; lit. 'Harmony') as the train name.

== Overview ==
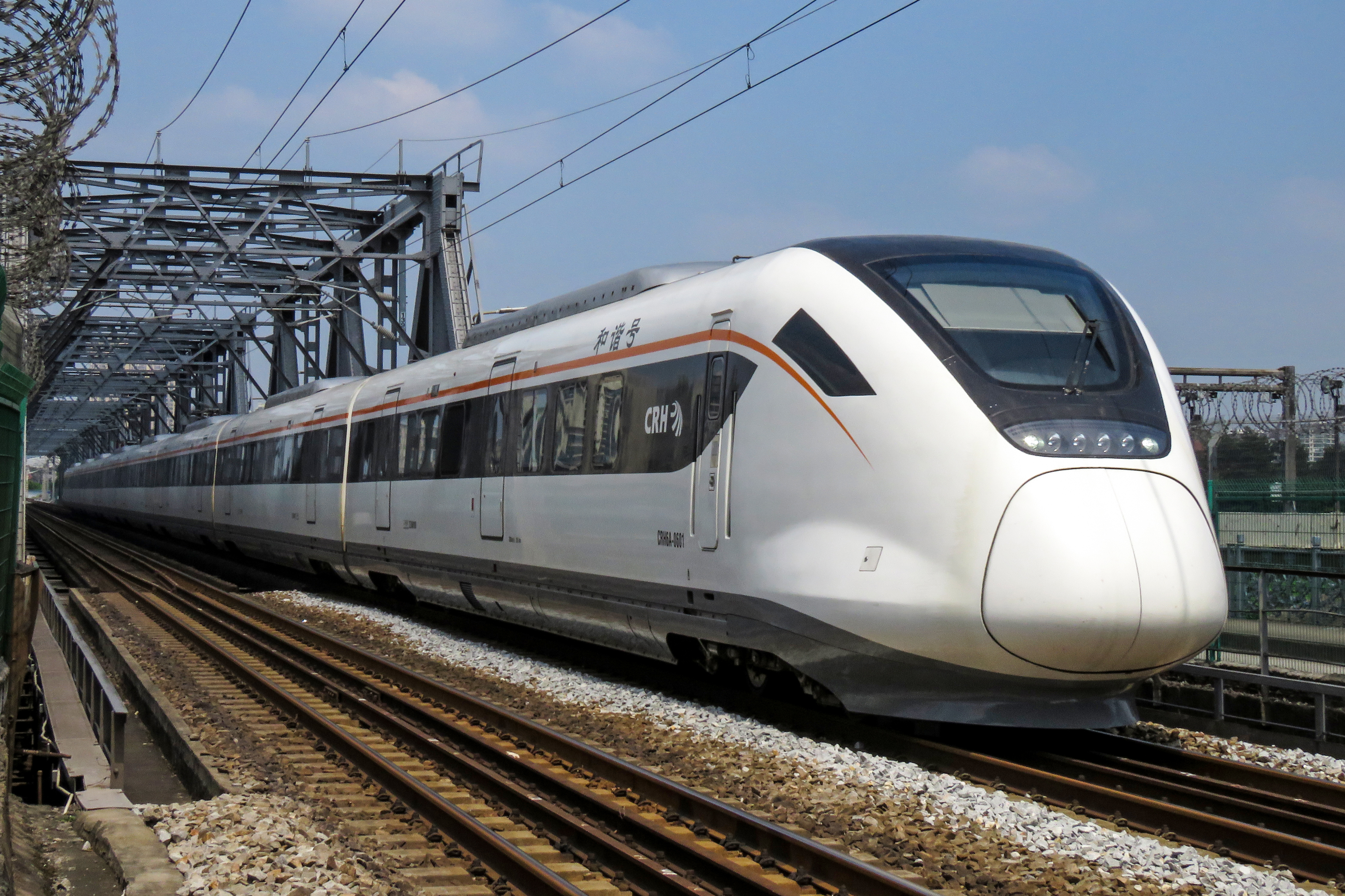
CRH6A-0601 serving Guangzhou-Foshan-Zhaoqing intercity railway in September 2018

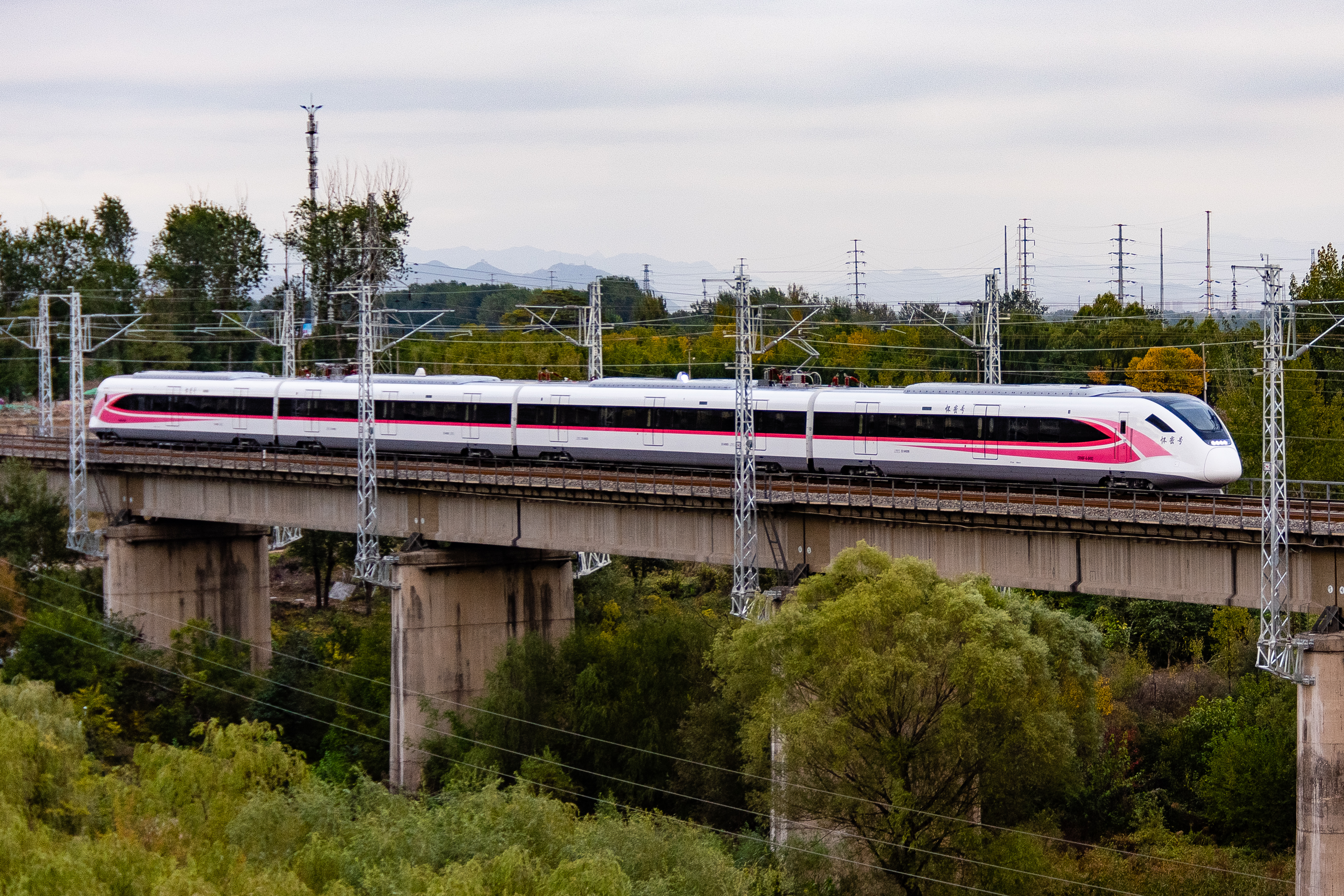
CRH6F-A-0492 serving Huairou–Miyun line in October 2020

The CRH6 will be divided into three major types, according to stopping patterns:

- CRH6A is the higher speed version with a designed top speed 250 km/h (155 mph), top operating speed 220 km/h (137 mph) to be used on regional non-stop or express services. It uses a 2+2 transverse seating layout using reversible seats that have a similar level of comfort and space to that of intercity trains. There is a toilet on cars 1, 3, 5, and 7.
- CRH6F is the High-speed rail version with a designed top speed 180 km/h (112 mph), operating speed 160 km/h (99 mph) to be used on express commuter services. It uses a 2+2 transverse seating layout with non-reversible seats that have a similar level of comfort and space to that of a suburban train. There is a toilet on cars 3 and 6.

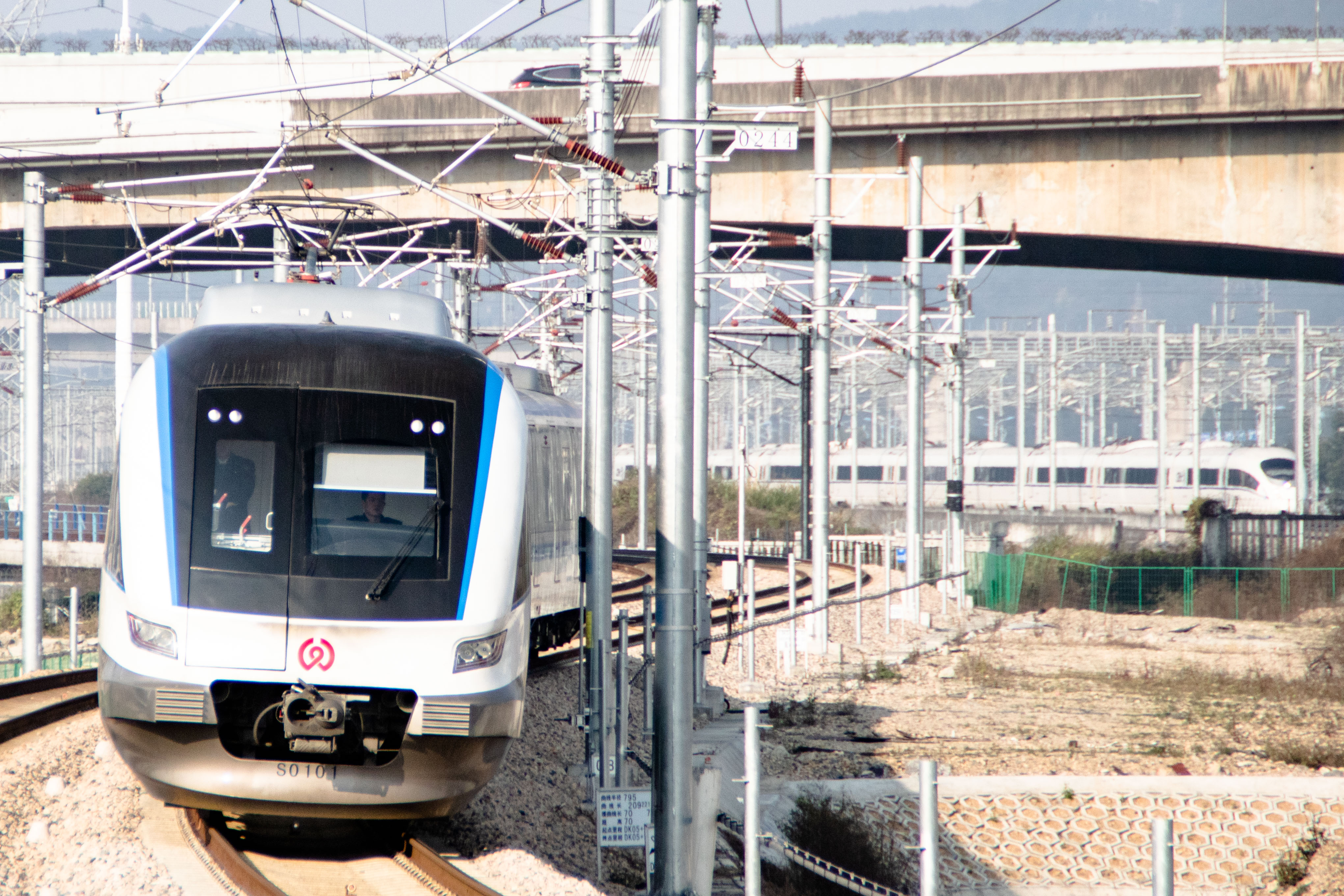
Metropolitan area EMU based on the Cinova intercity train platform used on Line S1 (Wenzhou Rail Transit)

- Metropolitan area EMU based on the Cinova intercity train platform (Chinese: 基于Cinova城际列车平台衍生的市域动车组) with a designed top speed 140 km/h (87 mph), to be used on local commuter services. It will feature longitudinal seating arrangements similar to that of subway trains with more and larger doors for faster boarding and alighting.

On December 29, 2009, the MOR ordered 22 sets of 160 km/h (99 mph) class and 10 sets of 200 km/h (124 mph) class 6-car Intercity High Speed train from CRRC Puzhen, the contract worth 2346 million RMB, and now the order has been transformed into 24 sets of CRH6 and will be delivered by the end of 2012.

== Formations ==
=== CRH6A ===
| Car No. | 1 | 2 | 3 | 4 | 5 | 6 | 7 | 8 |
|---|---|---|---|---|---|---|---|---|
| Designation | Tc | M | | Tp | T | Mp | M | Tc |
| Numbering | ZE xxxx01 | ZE xxxx02 | ZE xxxx03 | ZE xxxx04 | ZE xxxx05 | ZE xxxx06 | ZE xxxx07 | ZE xxxx00 |
| Capacity (seated) | 45 | 64 | | 62 | 64 | | | 50 |

=== CRH6A-A ===
| Car No. | 1 | 2 | 3 | 4 |
|---|---|---|---|---|
| Designation | Tc | Mp | | Tc |
| Numbering | ZE xxxx01 | ZE xxxx02 | ZE xxxx03 | ZE xxxx00 |
| Capacity (seated) | 50 | 78 | 74 | 50 |

== Lines served ==
=== CRH6 ===
- Ningbo–Yuyao intercity railway
- Qinbei high-speed railway (Qinbei HSR) (钦北高速铁路)
- Shaoxing Tourism New Transit railway
- Dongguan–Huizhou intercity railway (Guanhui ICR)
- Changzhutan Intercity Railway
- Chengdu-Dujiangyan intercity railway
- Guangzhou–Zhuhai intercity railway (Guangzhu ICR)
- Jinshan Railway
- Sub-Central line of the Beijing Suburban Railway (The Sub-Central line uses the Beijing underground cross-city railway in the section between Beijing West railway station and Beijing railway station)
- Guangzhou–Shenzhen railway (Guangshen railway)
- Guangzhou–Shenzhen intercity railway (Suishen ICR)
- Zhengzhou–Xinzheng Airport intercity railway
- Zhengzhou–Kaifeng intercity railway
- Zhengzhou–Jiaozuo intercity railway
- Foshan–Dongguan intercity railway (Foguan ICR) (under construction)
- Guangzhou–Foshan circular intercity railway (Guangfo circular ICR) (under construction)

=== Metropolitan area EMU based on the Cinova intercity train platform ===
This type is no longer officially considered as a type of CRH6.

- Line S1 (Wenzhou Rail Transit) (currently 4-car Type D. The line will use 6-car Type D in future.)
- Daxing Airport Express (currently 4-car and 8-car Type D.)

== See also ==
- China Railway CRH1
- China Railway CRH2
- China Railway CRH3A
- China Railway CJ1
- China Railway CJ2
- China Railway CJ3
- China Railway CJ5
- China Railway CJ6
