= Beijing–Chengde railway =

Railway line in China

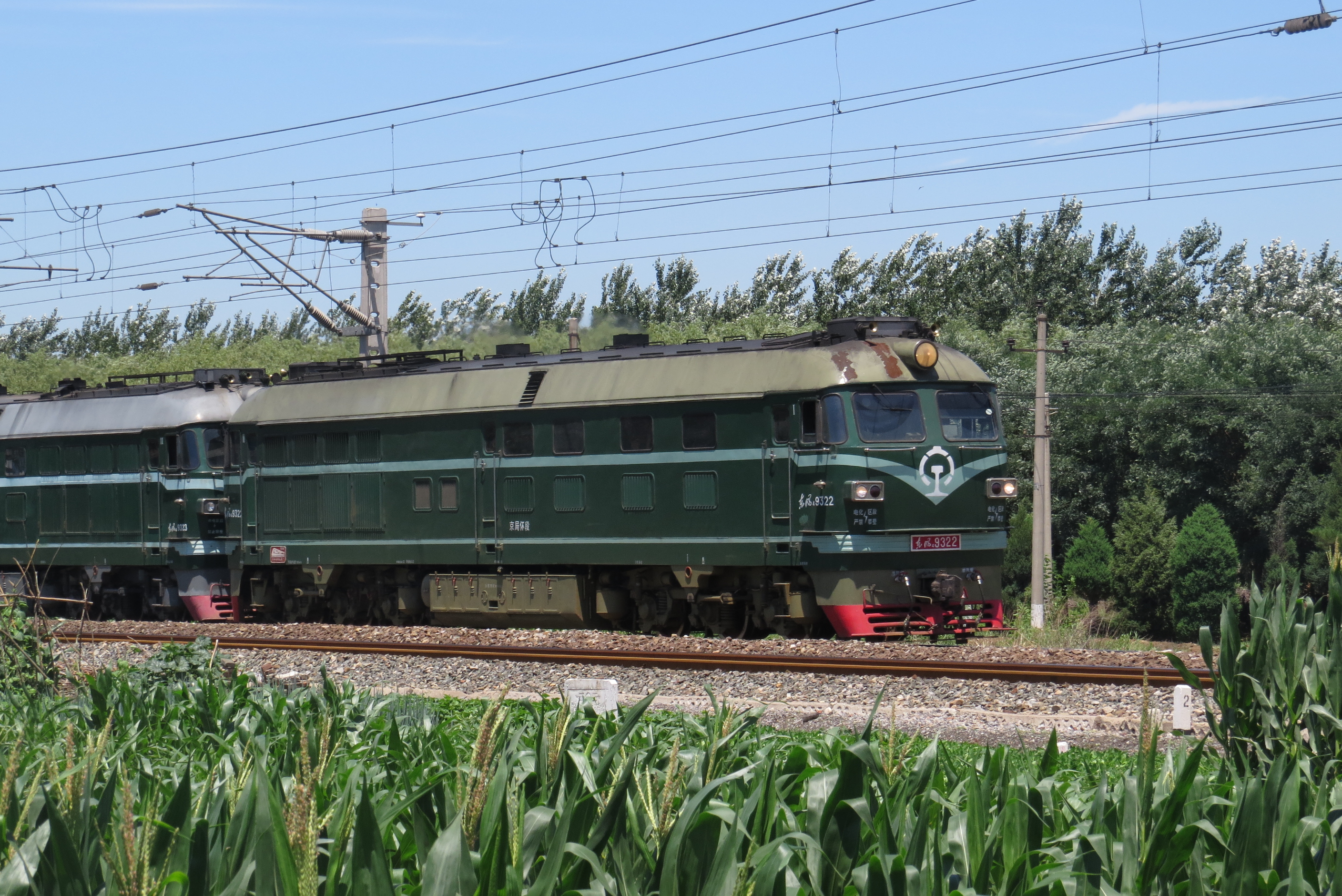
- A K7718 running on the Beijing-Chengde line

Overview
- Native name: 京承铁路
- Status: In operation
- Owner: China Railway
- Locale: Hebei, China
- Termini: Beijing; Chengde
- Stations: 30

Service
- Type: Heavy rail
- System: China Railway
- Operator(s): CR Beijing

History
- Opened: 1 April 1960

Technical
- Line length: 256 km (159 mi)
- Number of tracks: 2 (Shuangqiao to Huairou), 1 (Huairou to Chengde section)
- Track gauge: 1,435 mm (4 ft 8 1/2 in) standard gauge
- Electrification: 25 kV 50 Hz AC (Overhead line, south of Gaogezhuang)
- Operating speed: 110 km/h (68 mph) (Shuangqiao–Huairou); 45 km/h (28 mph)–90 km/h (56 mph) (Huairou–Chengde)
- Signalling: ABS

The Beijing–Chengde railway or Jingcheng railway (simplified Chinese: 京承铁路; traditional Chinese: 京承鐵路; pinyin: jīngchéng tiělù), is a railroad in northern China between Beijing, the national capital, and Chengde in Hebei Province. The line is 256 km (159 mi) long and runs northwest from Beijing Municipality to Chengde in northern Hebei.

== Route & history ==
The Jingcheng line from Dongbianmen to Huairou, 65.86 km (41 mi) in length was built in 1938 during the Japanese occupation of Beiping. The remaining 169 km (105 mi) from Huairou to Shangbancheng was built from 1955 to 1959. The line emerges north of the Great Wall at Chengzilu and then proceeds to Xinglong County and Yingshouyingzi before reaching Shangbancheng, where the line joins the Jinzhou–Chengde railway to Chengde.

The Beijing to Chengde section of the Beijing–Shenyang high-speed railway, opened in 2021, takes a similar but more direct and faster route between Beijing and Chengde.

== Rail connections ==
- Beijing railway station: Beijing–Shanghai railway, Beijing–Harbin railway, Beijing–Baotou railway
- Beijing East railway station: Beijing–Harbin railway, Beijing–Baotou railway
- Gaogezhuang: Datong–Qinhuangdao railway
- Huairou: Beijing–Tongliao railway
- Shangbancheng: Jinzhou–Chengde railway
- Chengde: Chengde–Longhua railway

== See also ==
- List of railways in China
