= Tongliao railway station =

Railway station in Tongliao, Inner Mongolia

Tongliao 通辽
- The station in 2026

General information
- Location: Horqin District, Tongliao, Inner Mongolia; China
- Coordinates: 43.6023°N 122.2656°E
- Operator: CR Harbin
- Lines: Tongliao–Ranghulu railway Tongliao–Holingol railway Dahushan–Shuangliao railway Jining–Tongliao railway Beijing–Tongliao railway Xinmin–Tongliao high-speed railway
Location

Tongliao railway station (Chinese: 通辽站) is a railway station in Horqin District, Tongliao, Inner Mongolia, China. The station is an interchange between several conventional railways and is the terminus of the Xinmin–Tongliao high-speed railway, a branch from the Beijing–Shenyang high-speed railway.

== History ==
In May 2016, reconstruction of the station began. First, new high-speed platforms were built. These were opened in August 2017. Subsequently, all trains began using the new platforms to allow the original station to be refurbished. This was completed in December 2017.
