= Beijing Suburban Railway =

Commuter rail service system in Beijing

BCR
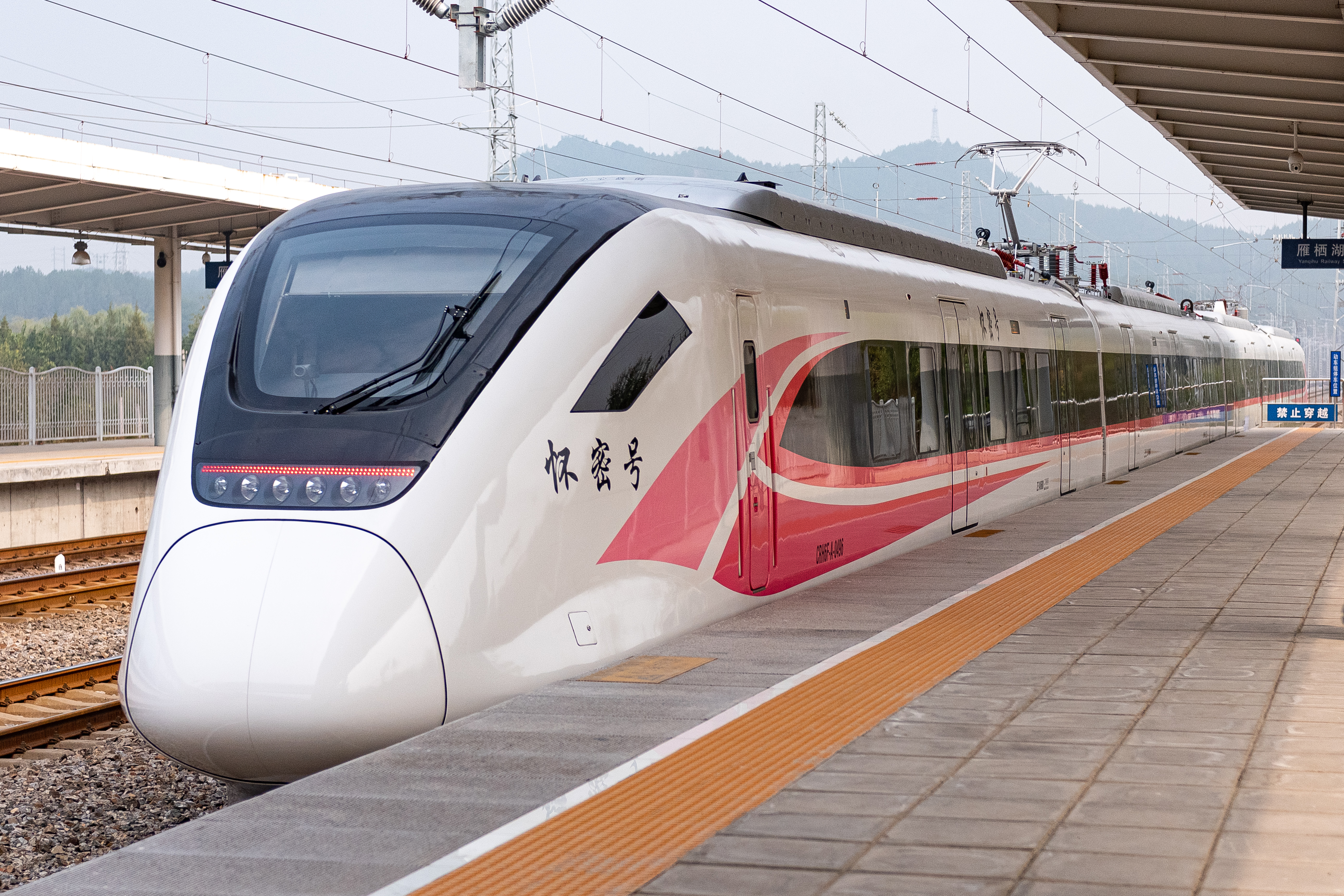
- CRH6F leaving for Huairou North from Platform 1

Overview
- Locale: Beijing
- Transit type: Commuter rail
- Number of lines: 4
- Number of stations: 28

Operation
- Began operation: August 6, 2008; 18 years ago
- Operator: China Railway Beijing Group

Technical
- System length: 400 km (250 mi)
- Track gauge: 1,435 mm (4 ft 8 1/2 in)
System map
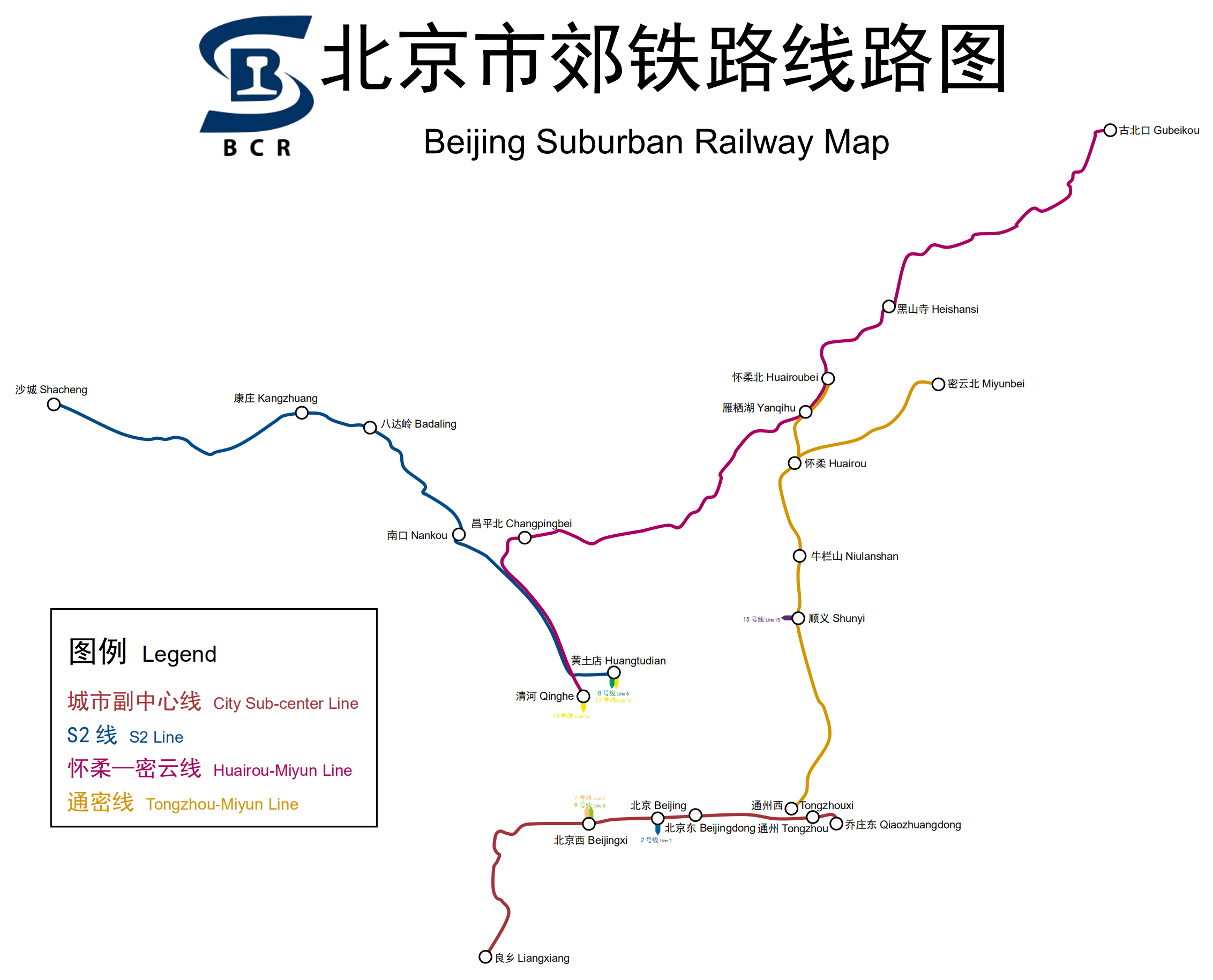

BCR
- Simplified Chinese: 北京城市铁路
- Traditional Chinese: 北京城市鐵路
Transcriptions
Standard Mandarin
- Hanyu Pinyin: Běijīng Chéngshì Tiělù

Alternative Chinese name
- Simplified Chinese: 北京市郊铁路
- Traditional Chinese: 北京市郊鐵路
Transcriptions
Standard Mandarin
- Hanyu Pinyin: Běijīng Shìjiāo Tiělù

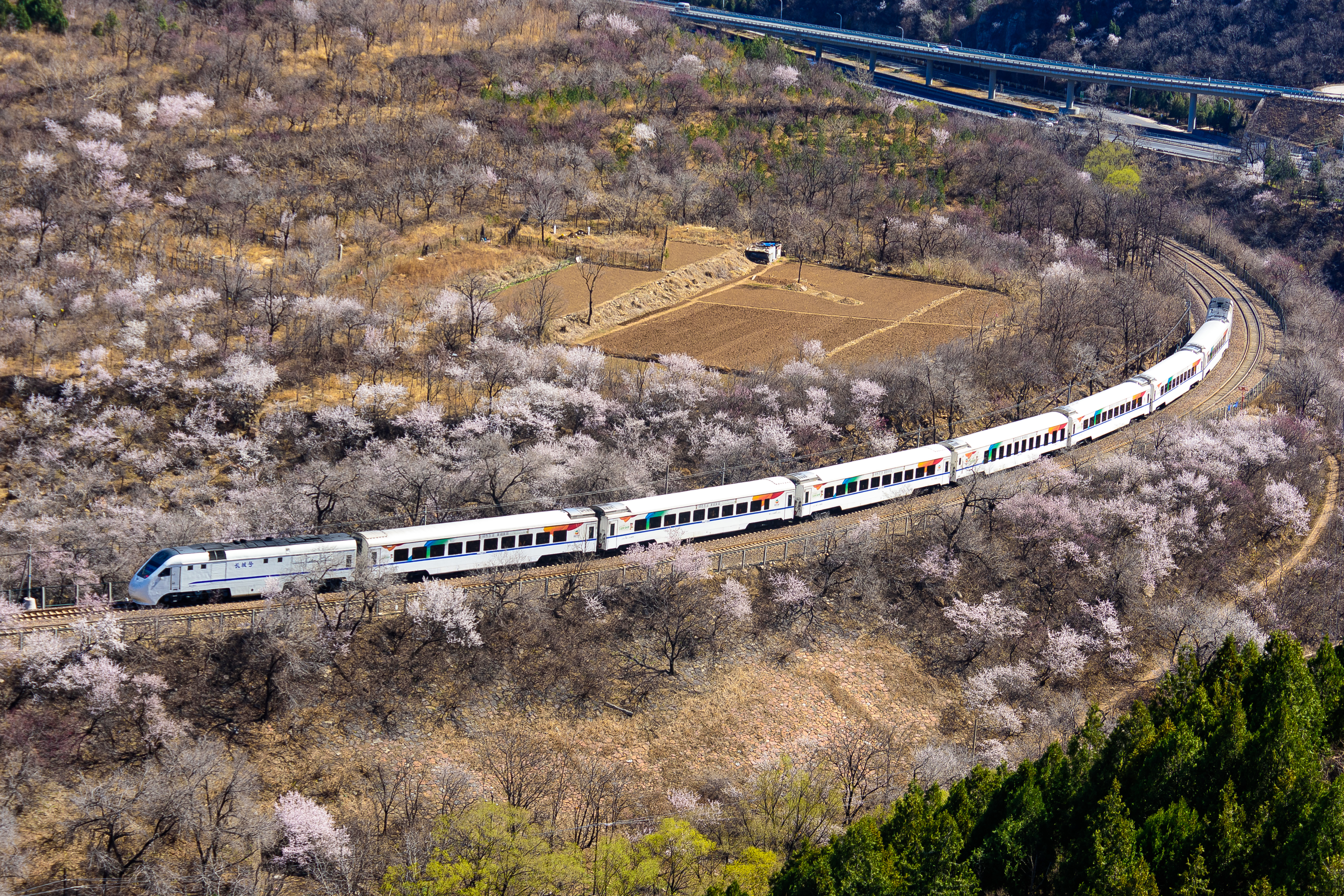
Line S2's NDJ3 from Yanqing to Huangtudian

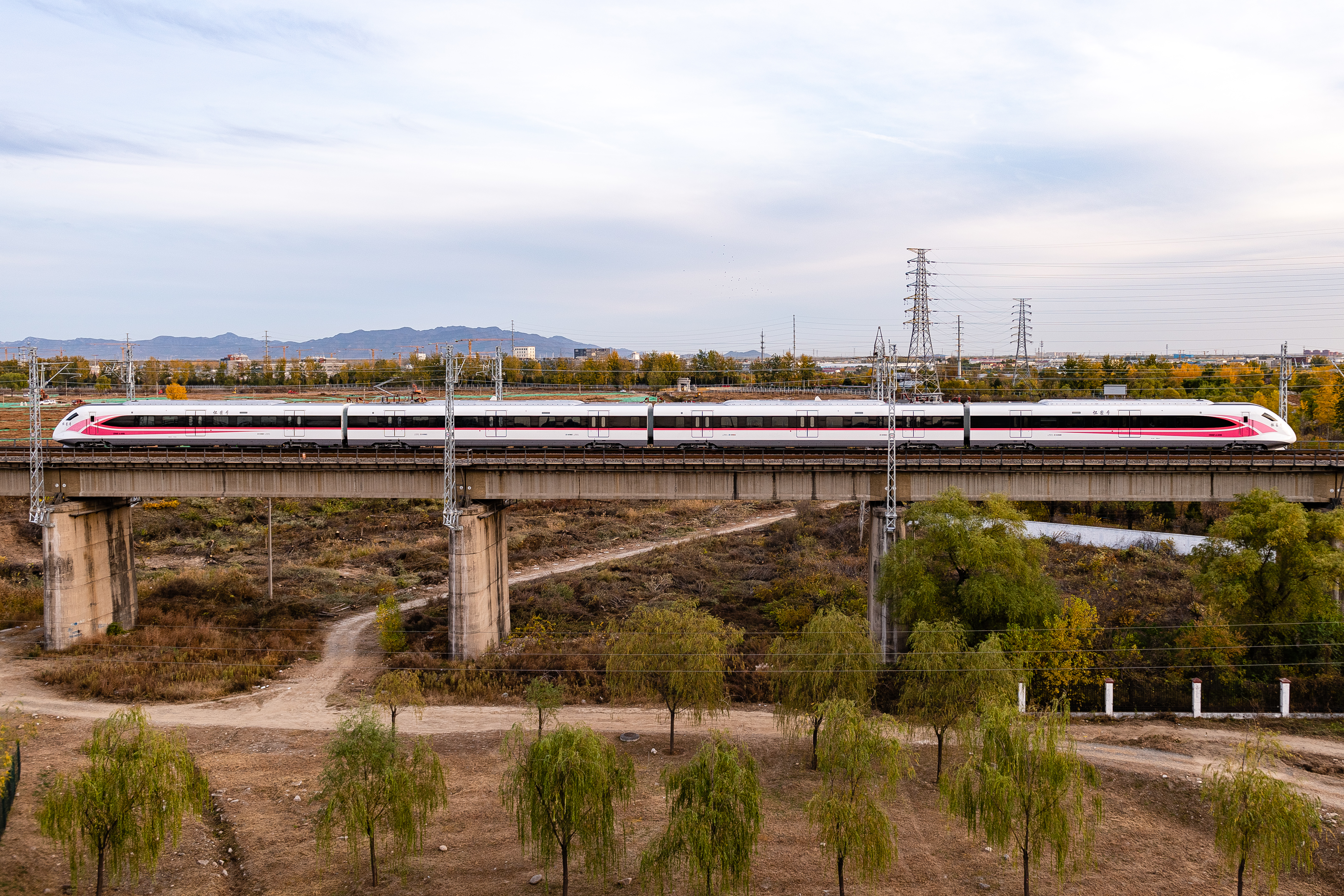
Huaimi Line's CRH6F from Huairou North to Beijing North

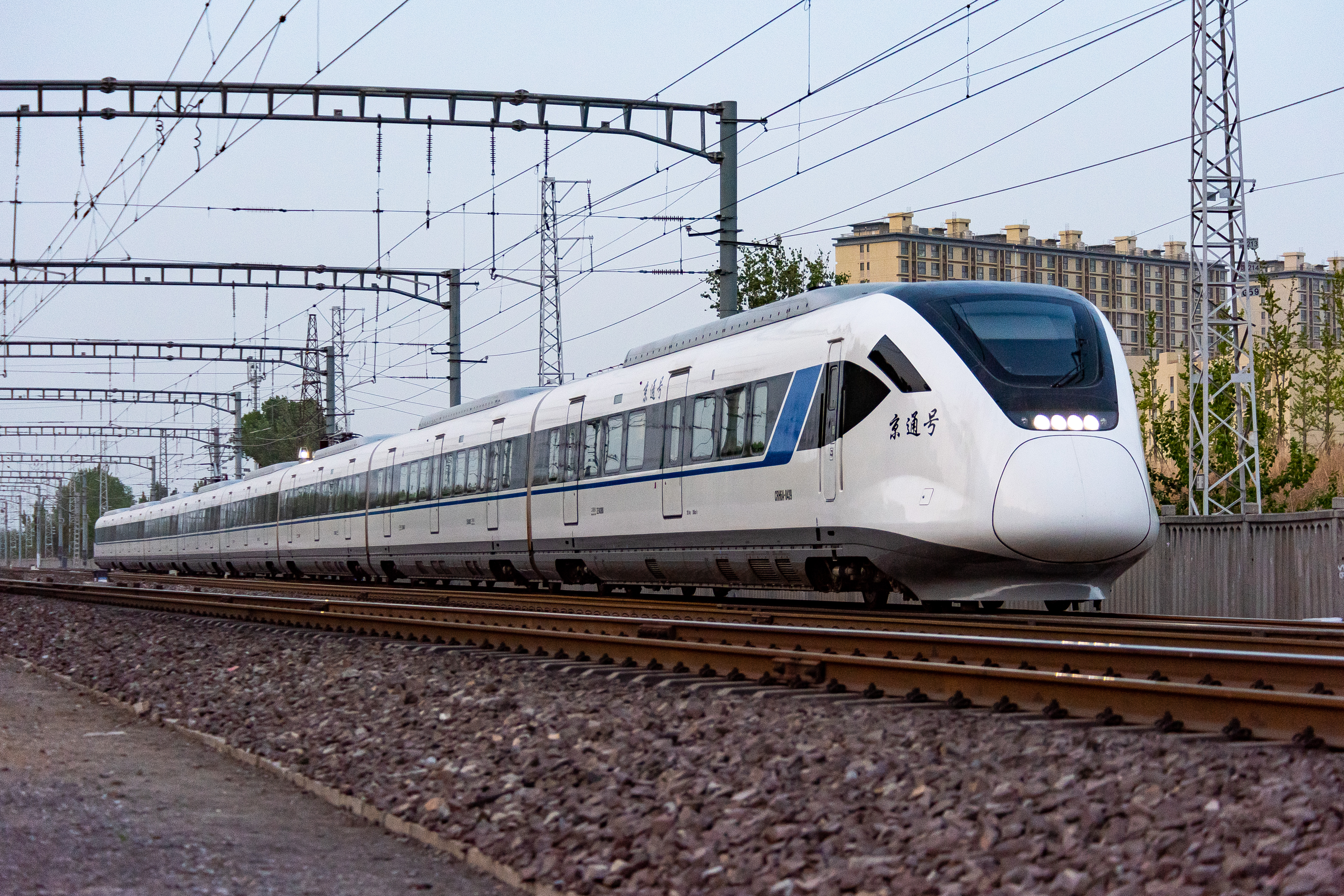
Sub-Central Line's CRH6A-0439 at Changyang, Fangshan

BCR (Beijing City Rail) also known as Beijing Suburban Railway is a commuter rail service that connects urban Beijing with outlying districts beyond the reach of the city's Beijing Subway network. The suburban rail services run on existing China Railway lines.

The suburban rail services are managed by the China Railway Beijing Group, an agency of the Ministry of Railways that is not affiliated with the operators of Beijing Subway.

There are 4 suburban railway corridors currently in operation: Line S2, Sub-Central line, Huairou–Miyun line and Tongmi line.

== In operation ==
Line	Service route	Opened	Length km	Routing
Sub-Central	Liangxiang – Fangshandong (East) – Houlücun – Yamenkoudong (East) – Beijingxi (West) – Beijing – Beijingdong (East) – Tongzhou – Qiaozhuangdong (East)	31 December 2017	63.7	Jingguang railway, Beijing underground cross-city railway, Jingha railway, Tongqiao railway
S2	Main line: Huangtudian – Nankou – Badaling – Yanqing; Branch: Huangtudian – Nankou – Badaling – Kangzhuang – Shacheng	6 August 2008 (main); 21 December 2012 (branch)	108.3	Beijing Northeast Ring railway, Jingbao railway
Huairou–Miyun	Beijingbei (North) – Qinghe – Changpingbei (North) – Yanqihu – Huairoubei (North) – Heishansi – Gubeikou	31 December 2017	144.6	Jingzhang intercity railway, Jingtong railway
Tongmi	Main line: Tongzhouxi (West) – Shunyi – Niulanshan – Huairou – Miyunbei (North); Branch: Tongzhouxi (West) – Shunyi – Niulanshan – Huairou – Yanqihu – Huairoubei (North)	30 June 2020	83.4	Jingcheng railway, Jingtong railway

=== History ===
- 6 August 2008: Line S2 opened.
- 21 December 2012: Line S2 (branch) opened
- 1 November 2016: Line S2 (main line and branch line) — was diverted from Beijingbei (North) to Huangtudian.
- 31 December 2017: Sub-Central line and Huairou–Miyun line opened.
- 30 April 2019: Huairou–Miyun line — Yanqihu station (formerly known as Fangezhuang) opened, and the northern destination was extended to Gubeikou.
- 20 June 2019: Sub-Central line — Eastern extension to Qiaozhuangdong (East).
- 30 December 2019: Huairou–Miyun line — was diverted from Huangtudian to Qinghe.
- 30 March 2020: Line S2 (main line) — shortened to Badaling railway station for Yanqing railway station renovation, free shuttle bus is offered to Yanqing urban area.
- 30 June 2020: Sub-Central line — Western extension to Liangxiang. Tongmi line opened.
- 1 August ~ 20 August 2020: Huairou–Miyun line — whole line stop service for the Beijing–Tongliao railway electrification project.
- 30 September 2020: Huairou–Miyun line — Southern extension to Beijingbei (North).
- 1 December 2020: Line S2 (main line) — Yanqing railway station reopened.

== Short-term planning ==
Line	Service route	Planned Opening Date
Northeast Ring	Huangtudian – Wangjing – Beijing Chaoyang – Beijingdong (East)	2026-2028
Yizhuang (Benz Special line)	Mixed passenger and freight railway (initially freight-only). Anding – Second Factory of Beijing Benz Automobile Co.	2023 (initially freight-only)

== See also ==
- Beijing Subway
