= China Railway Beijing Group =

Chinese railway operator

Coordinates: 39.9053°N 116.3269°E

China Railway Beijing Group Co., Ltd.
- Company type: state-owned enterprise
- Industry: Railway operations
- Predecessor: Beijing Railway Administration
- Founded: 19 November 2017
- Headquarters: 6 Fuxing Road, Haidian, Beijing, China
- Area served: Beijing; Hebei; Tianjin western Shandong northern Henan eastern Shanxi
- Owner: Government of China
- Parent: China Railway
- Website: Official Weibo Website

China Railway Beijing Group
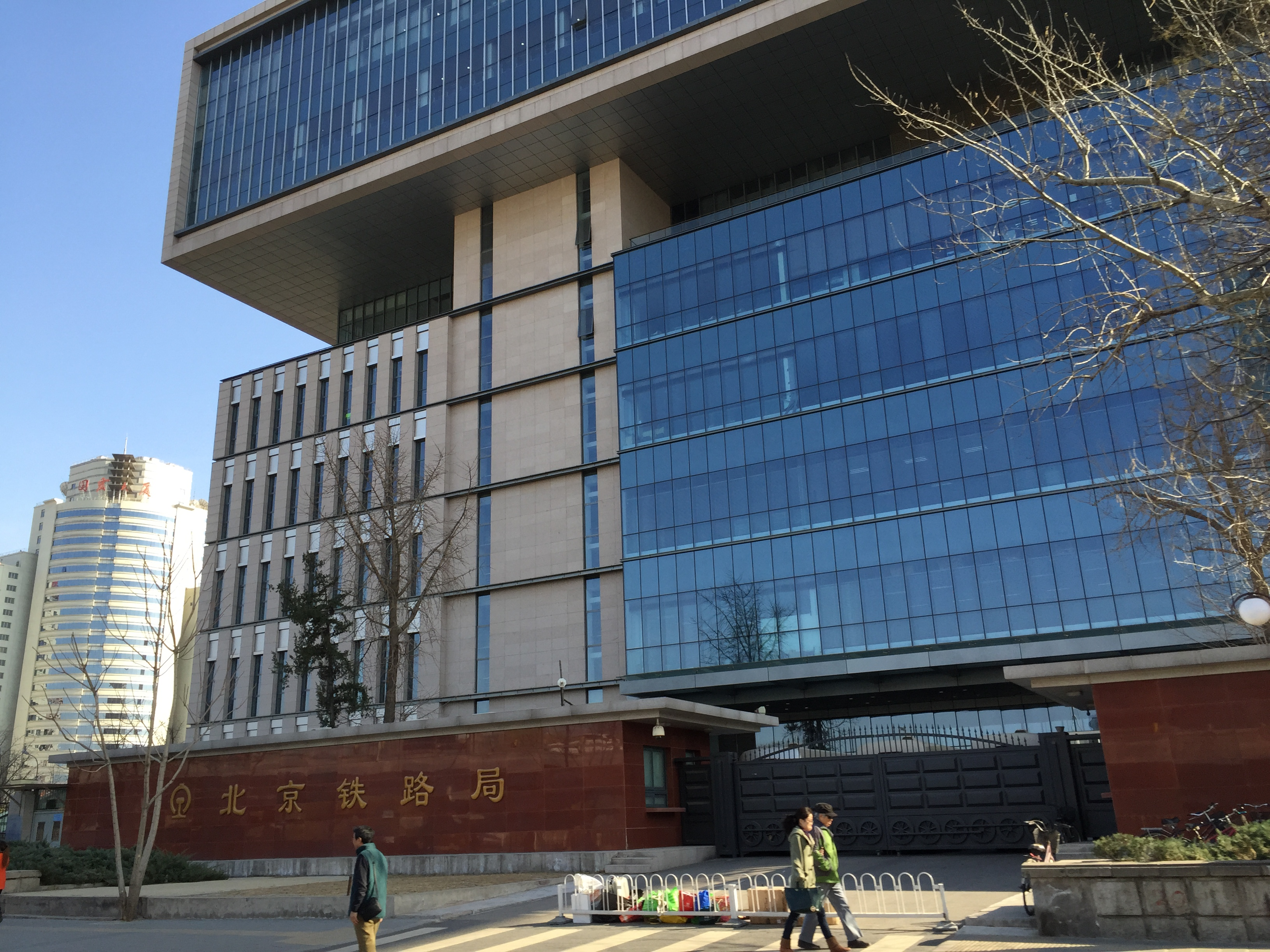
- The headquarters of CR Beijing
- Simplified Chinese: 中国铁路北京局集团
- Traditional Chinese: 中國鐵路北京局集團
Transcriptions
Standard Mandarin
- Hanyu Pinyin: Zhōngguó Tiělù Běijīng Jú Jítuán

Beijing Railway Administration
- Simplified Chinese: 北京铁路局
- Traditional Chinese: 北京鐵路局
Transcriptions
Standard Mandarin
- Hanyu Pinyin: Běijīng Tiělù Jú

CR Beijing
- Simplified Chinese: 京铁
- Traditional Chinese: 京鐵
Transcriptions
Standard Mandarin
- Hanyu Pinyin: Jīngtiě

China Railway Beijing Group, officially abbreviated as CR Beijing or CR-Beijing, formerly, Beijing Railway Administration is a subsidiary company under the jurisdiction of the China Railway (formerly the Ministry of Railway). The railway administration was reorganized as a company in November 2017.

It is responsible for the railway network within Beijing, Tianjin, and Hebei province. CR Beijing also operates and supervises the expansion of the Beijing Suburban Railway, the commuter rail service linking urban Beijing and surrounding suburbs.

High speed services on the Beijing-Tianjin intercity railway are also managed by CR Beijing.

== Hub stations ==
- Beijing
  - Beijing, Beijing West, Beijing South, Beijing North, Fengtai, Fengtai West
- Tianjin
  - Tianjin, Tianjin West, Binhai West, Binhai
- Shijiazhuang
  - Shijiazhuang, Shijiazhuang South
- Tangshan
  - Tangshan, Tangshan South

== Regional services ==
=== S-train services ===
- Beijing Suburban Railway
  - Sub-Central, S2, Huairou–Miyun, Tongmi
- Tianjin
  - Tianjin–Jizhou (S9)
- Yangquan
  - Yangda

=== C-train services ===
- Jingjin
- Jingxiong
