= Baiziwan station =

Beijing Subway station

Coordinates: 39.89253°N 116.497768°E

Baiziwan 百子湾
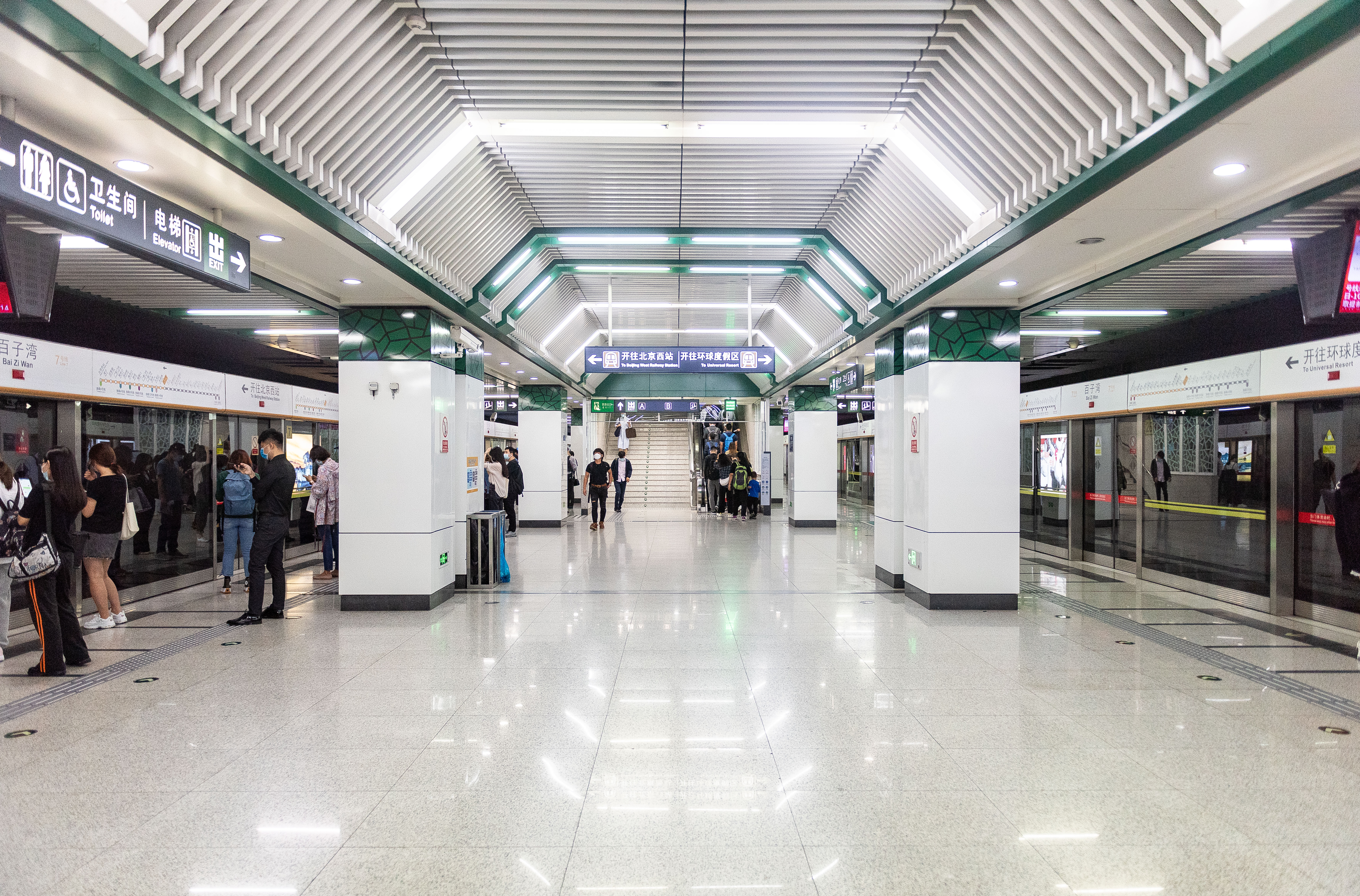
- Platform

General information
- Location: Guangqu Road; Nanmofang, Chaoyang District, Beijing; China
- Operator: Beijing Mass Transit Railway Operation Corporation Limited
- Line: Line 7
- Platforms: 2 (1 island platform)
- Tracks: 2

Construction
- Structure type: Underground
- Accessible: Yes

History
- Opened: December 28, 2014

Services
| Preceding station | Beijing Subway | Following station |
|---|---|---|
| Dajiaoting towards Beijing West railway station | Line 7 | Huagong towards Universal Resort |
Location
- Location within Beijing

Baiziwan Station (simplified Chinese: 百子湾站; traditional Chinese: 百子灣站; pinyin: Bǎizǐwān Zhàn) is a station on Line 7 of the Beijing Subway towards the southern part of the city. It was opened on December 28, 2014 as a part of the stretch between Beijing West railway station and Jiaohuachang and is located between Dajiaoting and Huagong.

It is located in Chaoyang District along Guangqu Road east of the East 4th Ring Road Middle on the north side of the former Beijing Chemical Engineering 2nd Plant (北京化工二厂).

== Station layout ==
The station has an underground island platform.

== Exits ==
There are 4 exits, lettered A1, A2, A3, and B. Exit A1 is accessible.
