= Jiulongshan station =

Beijing Subway interchange station

Jiulongshan 九龙山
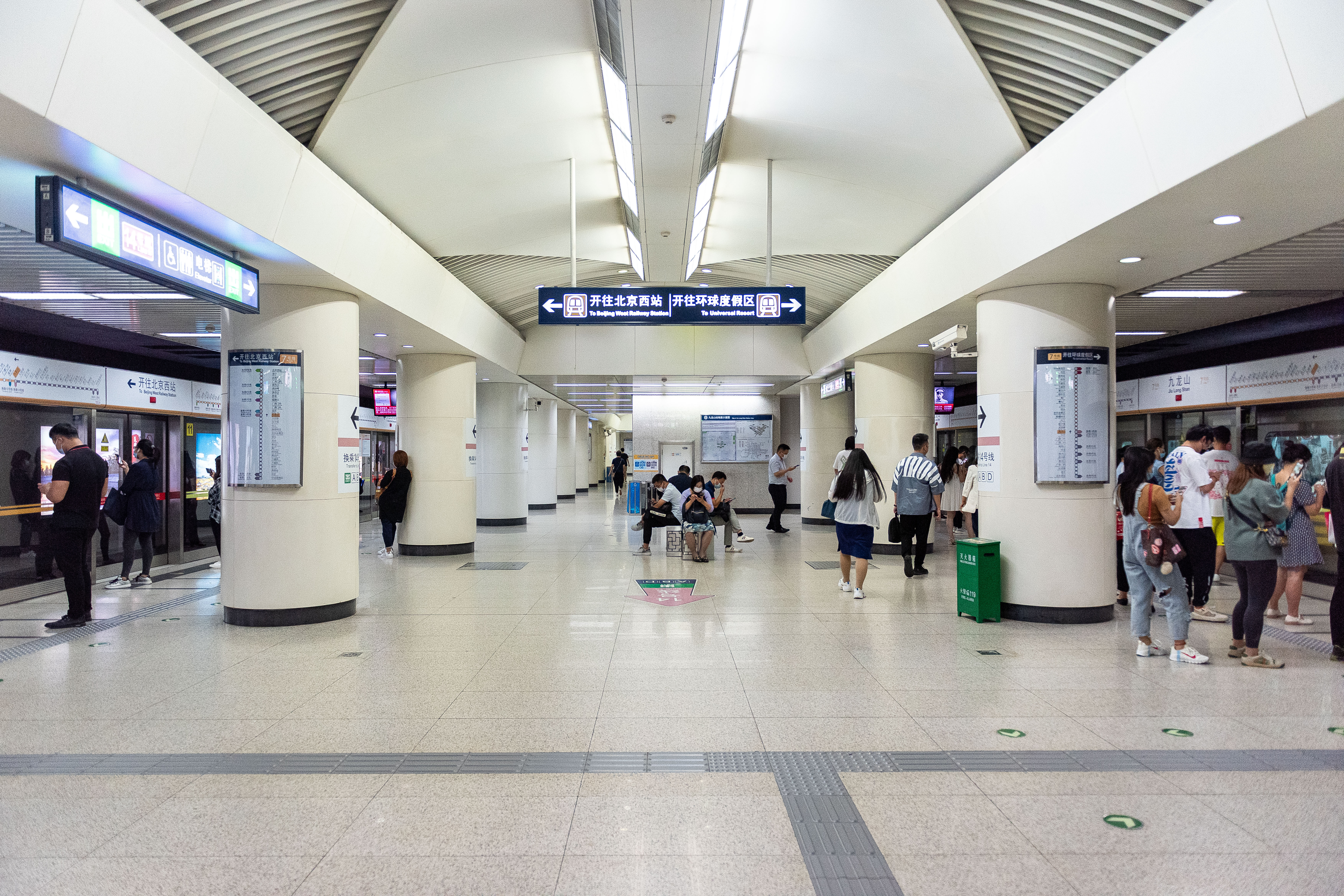
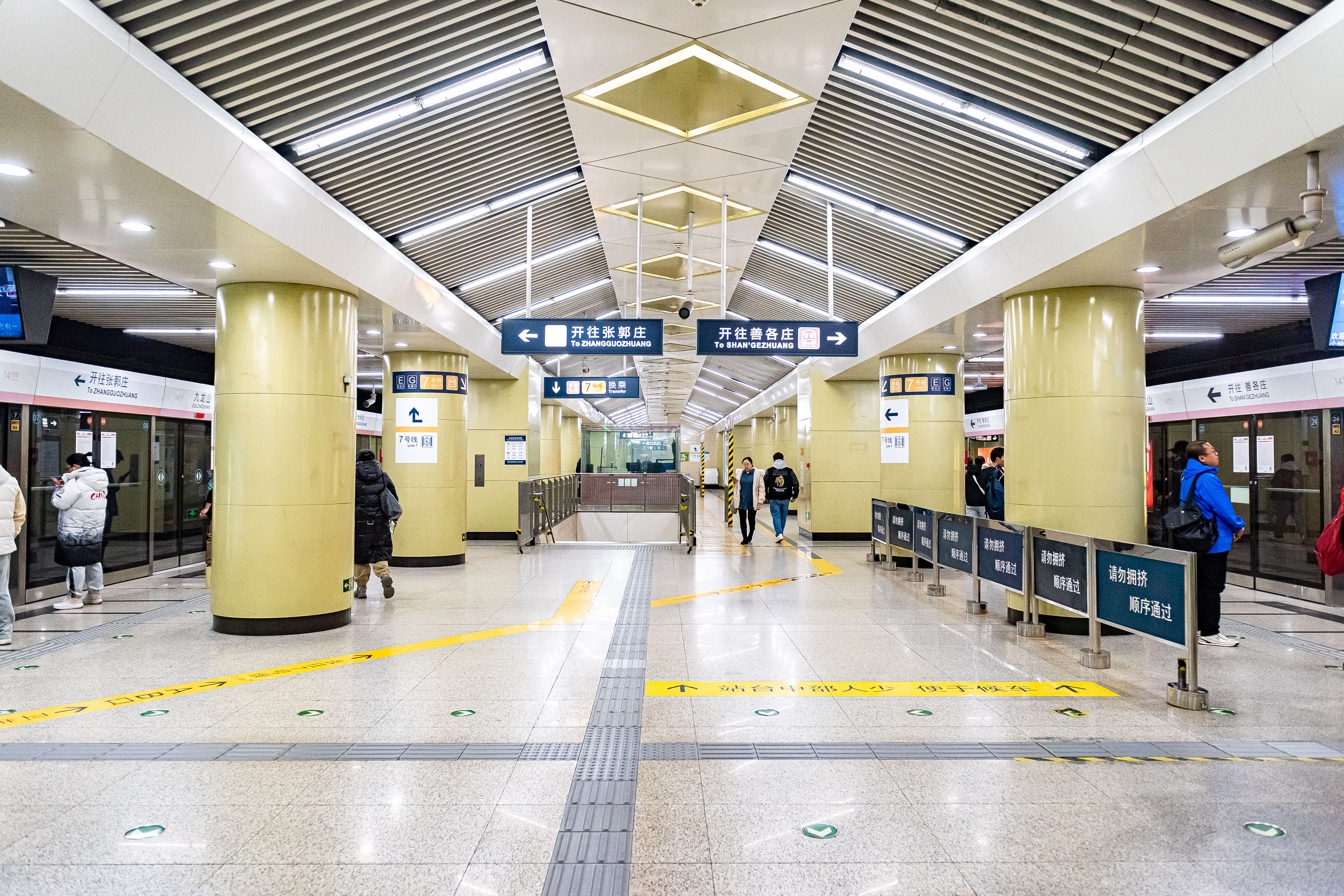
- Line 7 platform Line 14 platform

General information
- Location: Guangqu Road and Xidawang Road (西大望路); Chaoyang District, Beijing; China
- Coordinates: 39.8927°N 116.4769°E
- Operator: Beijing Mass Transit Railway Operation Corporation Limited (Line 7); Beijing MTR Corporation Limited (Line 14)
- Lines: Line 7; Line 14
- Platforms: 4 (2 island platforms)
- Tracks: 4

Construction
- Structure type: Underground
- Accessible: Yes

History
- Opened: December 28, 2014; 11 years ago (Line 7); December 26, 2015; 10 years ago (Line 14)

Services
Preceding station	Beijing Subway	Following station
Shuangjing towards Beijing West railway station	Line 7	Dajiaoting towards Universal Resort
Pingle Yuan towards Zhangguozhuang	Line 14	Dawang Lu towards Shangezhuang
Location
- Location within Beijing

Jiulongshan Station (simplified Chinese: 九龙山站; traditional Chinese: 九龍山站; pinyin: Jiǔlóngshān Zhàn) is an interchange station between Line 7 and Line 14 of the Beijing Subway. Line 7 station was opened on December 28, 2014, as a part of the stretch between Beijing West railway station and Jiaohuachang and is located between Shuangjing to the west, and Dajiaoting to the east. Line 14 station was opened on December 26, 2015.

== Station layout ==
Both the line 7 and 14 stations have underground island platforms.

== Exits ==
There are 5 exits, lettered A, B, D, E, and G. Exit B is accessible.

=== Shopping mall ===
Next to the subway station is the shopping mall Hopson One, you can directly go from the subway station to two floors of the shopping mall.

== Gallery ==
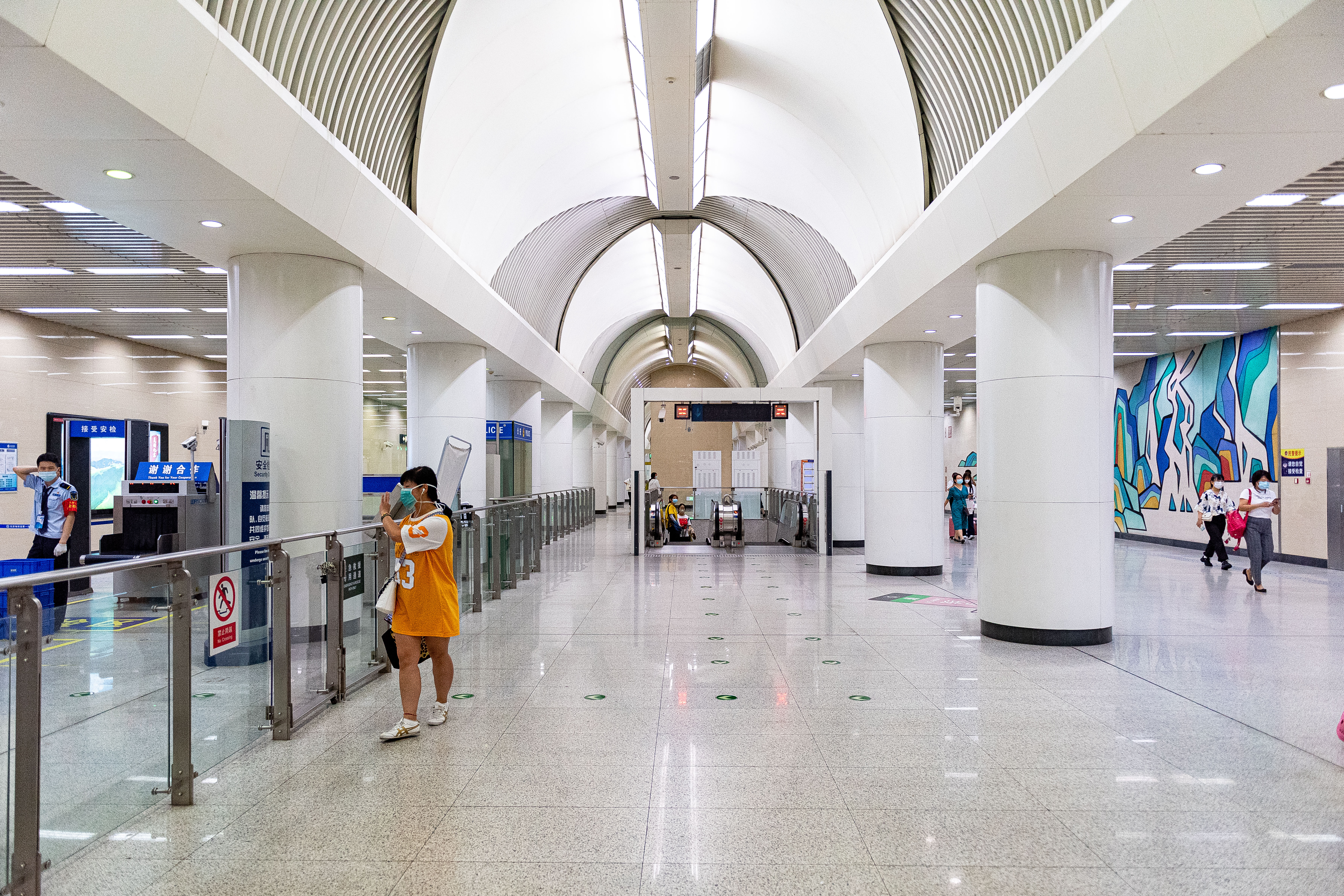
Line 7 concourse

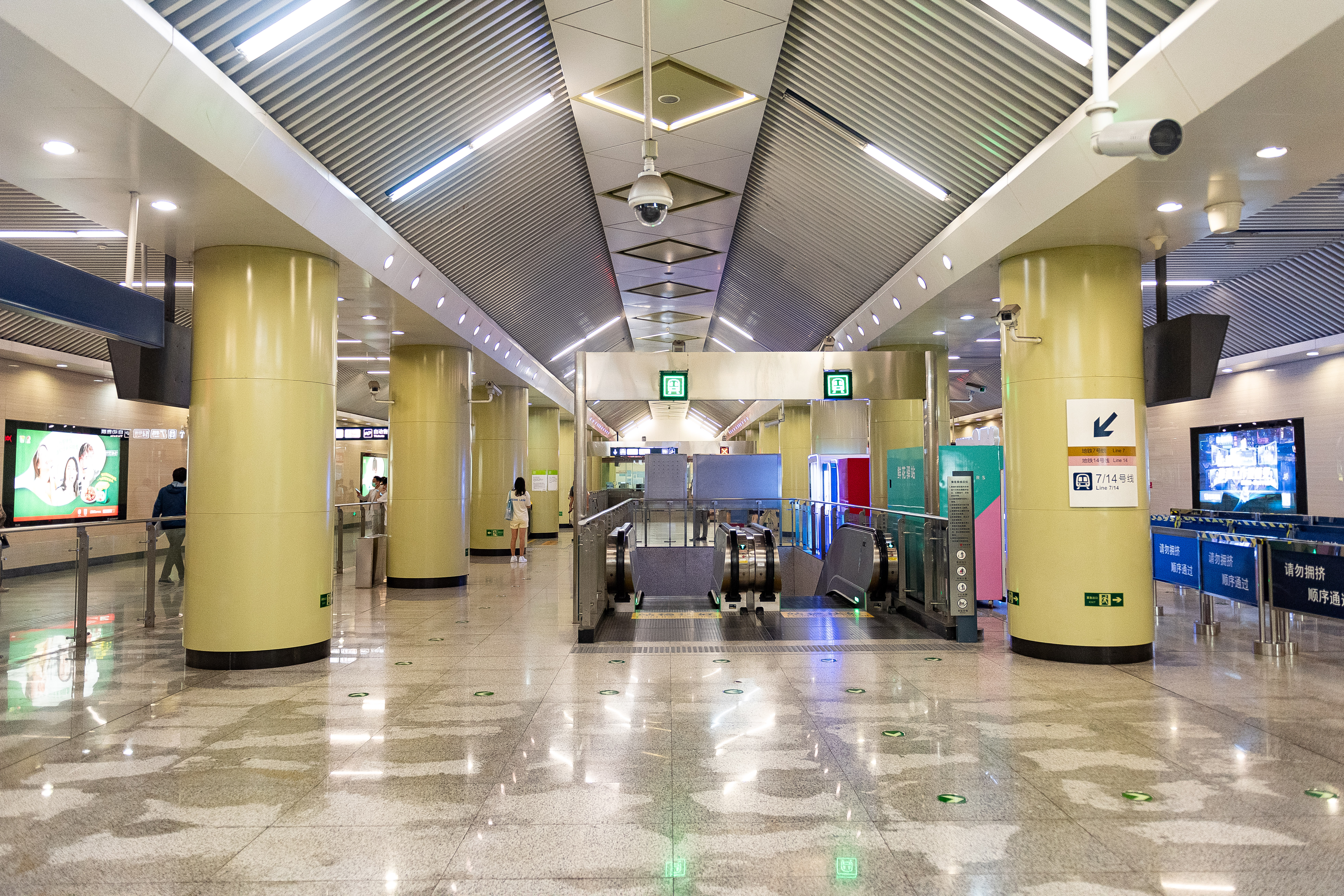
Line 14 north concourse

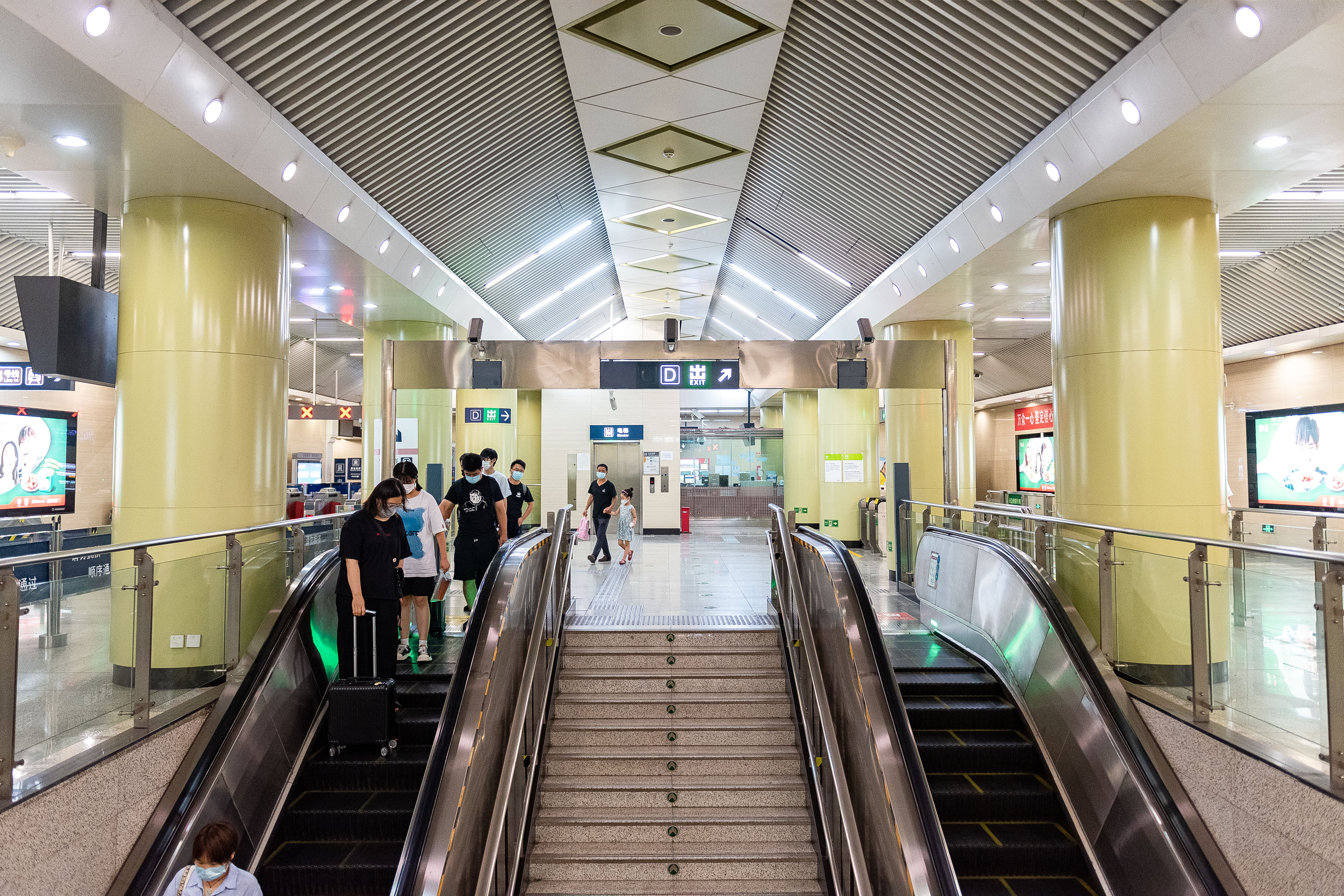
Line 14 south concourse
