= Nanlouzizhuang station =

Beijing Subway station

Nanlouzi Zhuang 南楼梓庄
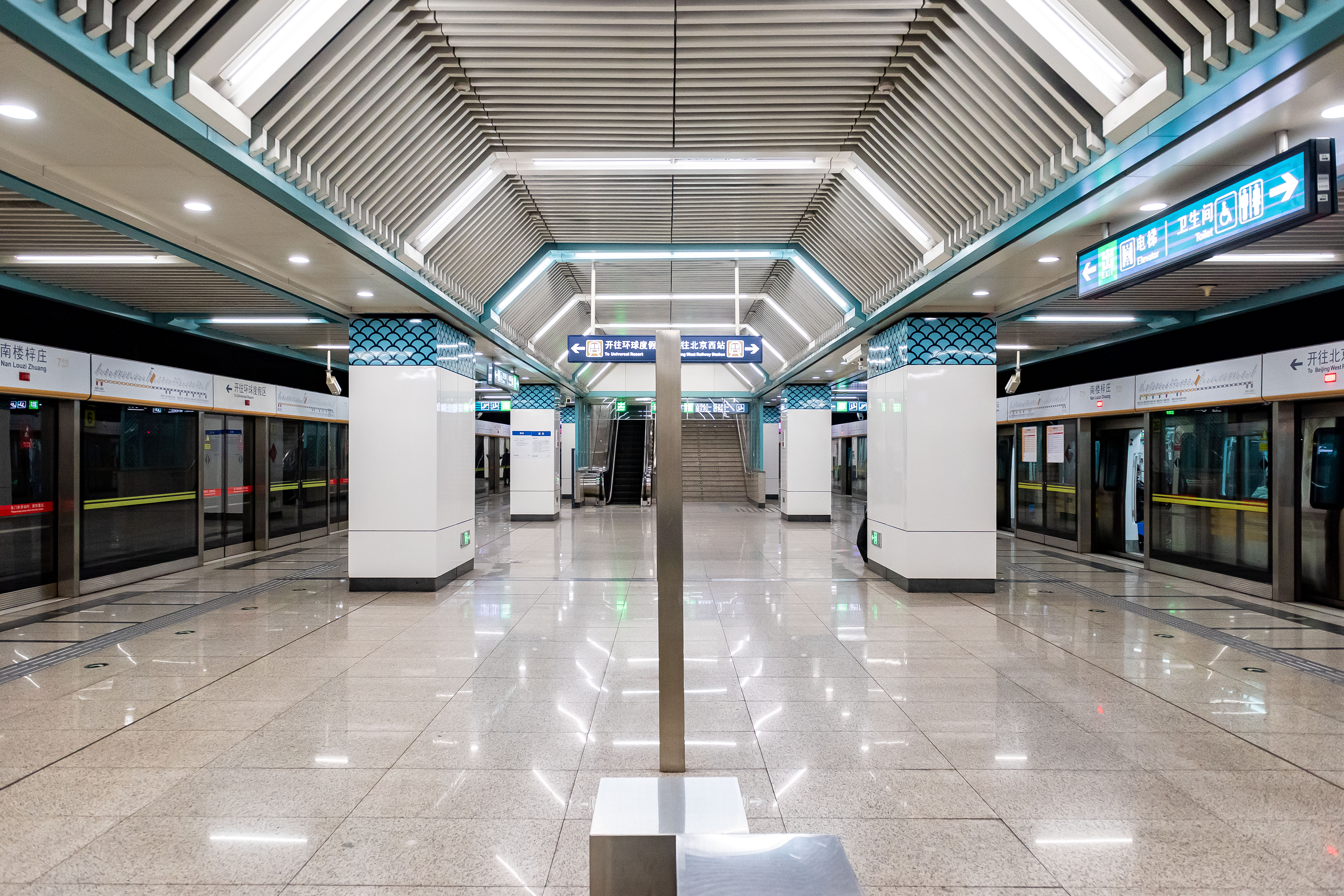
- Platform

General information
- Location: West Jinchan Road (金蝉西路) and Daliushu Road (大柳树路); Chaoyang District, Beijing; China
- Coordinates: 39.8748°N 116.5011°E
- Operator: Beijing Mass Transit Railway Operation Corporation Limited
- Line: Line 7
- Platforms: 2 (1 island platform)
- Tracks: 2

Construction
- Structure type: Underground
- Accessible: Yes

History
- Opened: December 28, 2014; 11 years ago

Services
Preceding station	Beijing Subway	Following station
Huagong towards Beijing West railway station	Line 7	Happy Valley towards Universal Resort
Location
- Location within Beijing

Nanlouzi Zhuang Station (simplified Chinese: 南楼梓庄站; traditional Chinese: 南樓梓莊站; pinyin: Nánlóuzǐ Zhuāng Zhàn) is a station on Line 7 of the Beijing Subway. It was opened on December 28, 2014 as a part of the stretch between Beijing West railway station and Jiaohuachang and is located between Huagong and Happy Valley.

== Station layout ==
The station has an underground island platform.

== Exits ==
There are 4 exits, lettered A, B, C, and D. Exit A is accessible.
