= Happy Valley station (Beijing Subway) =

Beijing Subway station

Happy Valley 欢乐谷景区
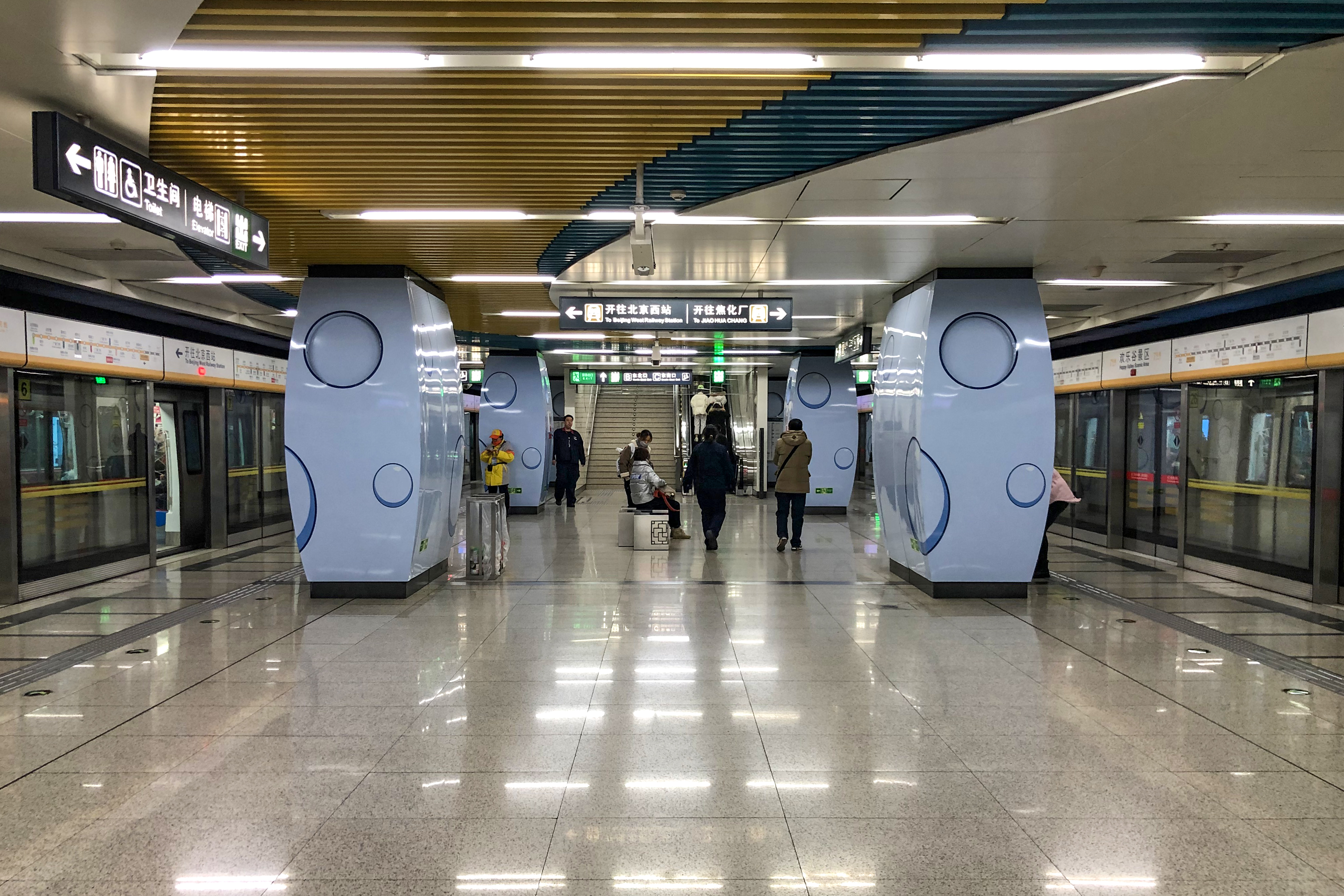
- Platform

General information
- Location: Happy Valley Beijing, Jinchan West Road (金蝉西路); Chaoyang District, Beijing; China
- Coordinates: 39.8670°N 116.4998°E
- Operator: Beijing Mass Transit Railway Operation Corporation Limited
- Line: Line 7
- Platforms: 2 (1 island platform)
- Tracks: 2

Construction
- Structure type: Underground
- Accessible: Yes

History
- Opened: December 28, 2014; 11 years ago
- Former names: Happy Valley Scenic Area (2014-2019)

Services
Preceding station	Beijing Subway	Following station
Nanlouzi Zhuang towards Beijing West railway station	Line 7	Fatou towards Universal Resort
Location
- Location within Beijing

Happy Valley station (simplified Chinese: 欢乐谷景区站; traditional Chinese: 歡樂谷景區站; pinyin: Huānlègǔ Jǐngqū zhàn) is a station on Line 7 of the Beijing Subway. It was opened on December 28, 2014 as a part of the stretch between Beijing West railway station and Jiaohuachang and is located between Nanlouzizhuang to the north and Fatou to the southeast.

== Station layout ==
The station has an underground island platform.

== Exits ==
There are 2 exits, lettered B and C. Exit C is accessible.

== See also ==
- Happy Valley Beijing
