= Shuangjing =

Shuangjing might refer to the following places in China:

- Shuangjing Subdistrict (双井街道)
  - Shuangjing Subdistrict, Beijing, subdistrict in Chaoyang District, Beijing
  - Shuangjing Subdistrict, Xinyang, subdistrict in Shihe District, Xinyang, Henan
- Shuangjing station (双井站), subway station on Line 7 and Line 10 of the Beijing Subway
- Shuangjing, Wei County (双井镇), town in Wei County, Henan
