= Huagong station =

Beijing Subway station

Huagong 化工
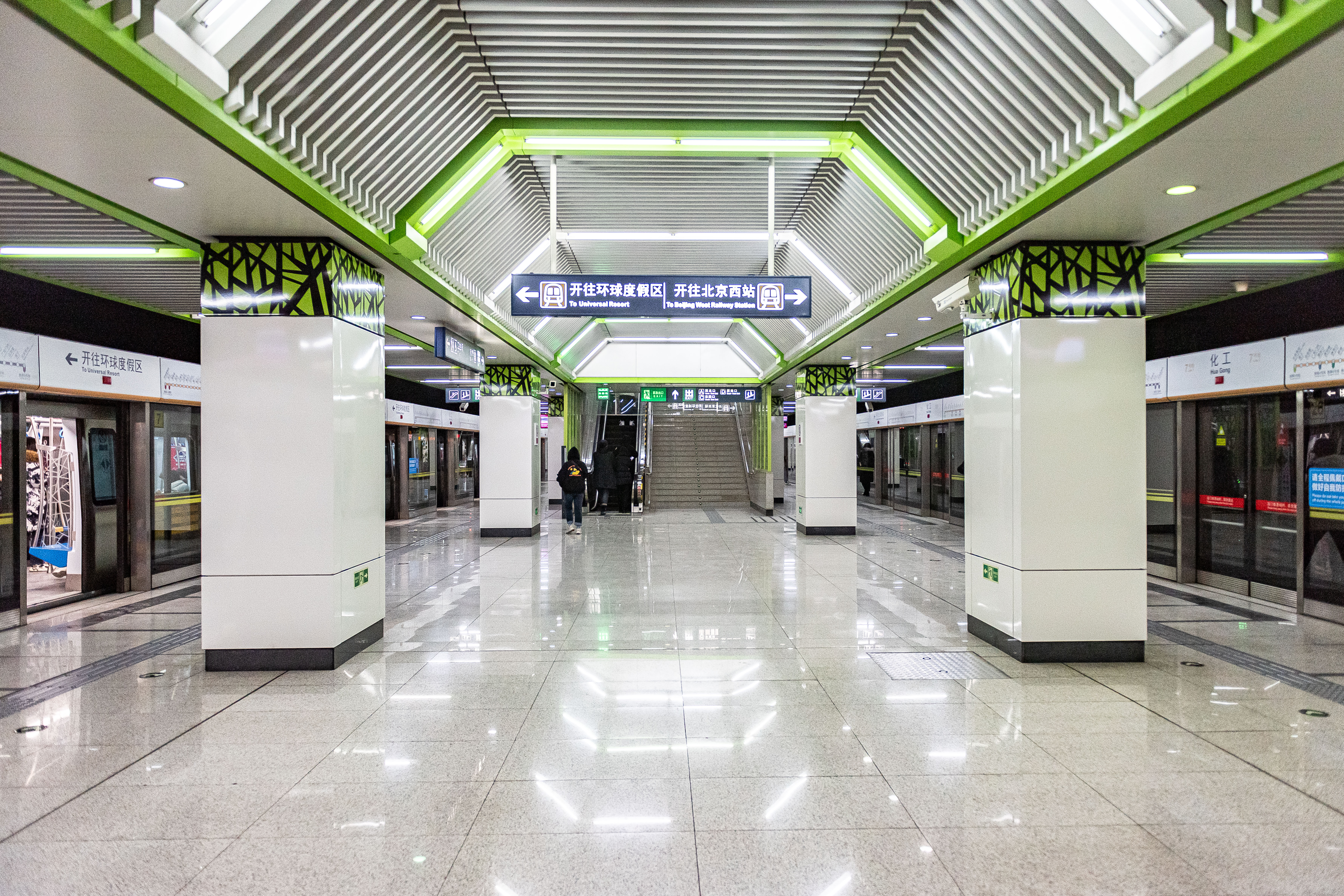
- Platform

General information
- Location: Chaoyang District, Beijing; China
- Coordinates: 39.887369°N 116.503439°E
- Operator: Beijing Mass Transit Railway Operation Corporation Limited
- Line: Line 7
- Platforms: 2 (1 island platform)
- Tracks: 2

Construction
- Structure type: Underground
- Accessible: Yes

History
- Opened: December 28, 2014; 11 years ago

Services
Preceding station	Beijing Subway	Following station
Baiziwan towards Beijing West railway station	Line 7	Nanlouzi Zhuang towards Universal Resort
Location
- Location within Beijing

Huagong Station (Chinese: 化工站; pinyin: Huàgōng Zhàn; lit. 'chemical engineering station') is a station on Line 7 of the Beijing Subway. It was opened on December 28, 2014 as a part of the stretch between Beijing West railway station and Jiaohua Chang and is located between Baiziwan and Nanlouzi Zhuang.

It is located in Chaoyang District southeast of the interchange of the East 4th Ring Road Middle and Guangqu Road, on the eastern side of the former Beijing Chemical Engineering 2nd Plant (北京化工二厂) in a former heavy industrial area that has significant heavy metal soil contamination.

== Station layout ==
The station has an underground island platform.

== Exits ==
There are 4 exits, lettered A, C, and D. Exit D is accessible.
