= Dajiaoting station =

Beijing Subway station

Coordinates: 39.8932°N 116.4892°E

Dajiaoting 大郊亭
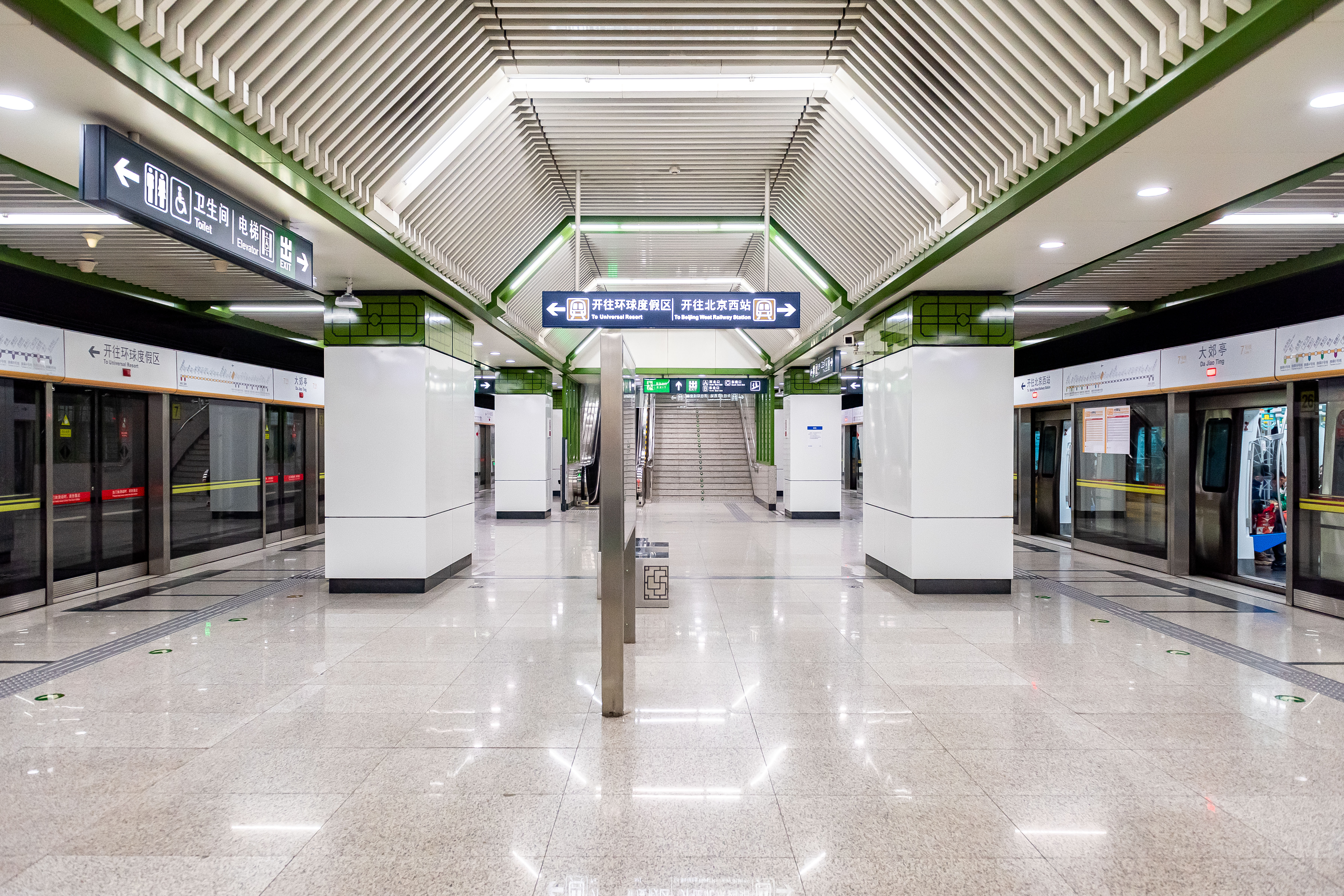
- Platform

General information
- Location: Guangqu Road and East 4th Ring Road Middle; Chaoyang District, Beijing; China
- Operator: Beijing Mass Transit Railway Operation Corporation Limited
- Line: Line 7
- Platforms: 2 (1 island platform)
- Tracks: 2

Construction
- Structure type: Underground
- Accessible: Yes

History
- Opened: December 28, 2014; 11 years ago

Services
Preceding station	Beijing Subway	Following station
Jiulongshan towards Beijing West railway station	Line 7	Baiziwan towards Universal Resort
Location
- Location within Beijing

Dajiaoting Station (Chinese: 大郊亭站; pinyin: Dàjiāotíng Zhàn) is a station on Line 7 of the Beijing Subway. It was opened on December 28, 2014 as a part of the stretch between Beijing West railway station and Jiaohuachang and is located between Jiulongshan and Baiziwan.

== Station layout ==
The station has an underground island platform.

== Exits ==
There are 3 exits, lettered A, B, and C. Exit B is accessible.
