= Heizhuanghu station =

Beijing Subway station

Heizhuanghu 黑庄户
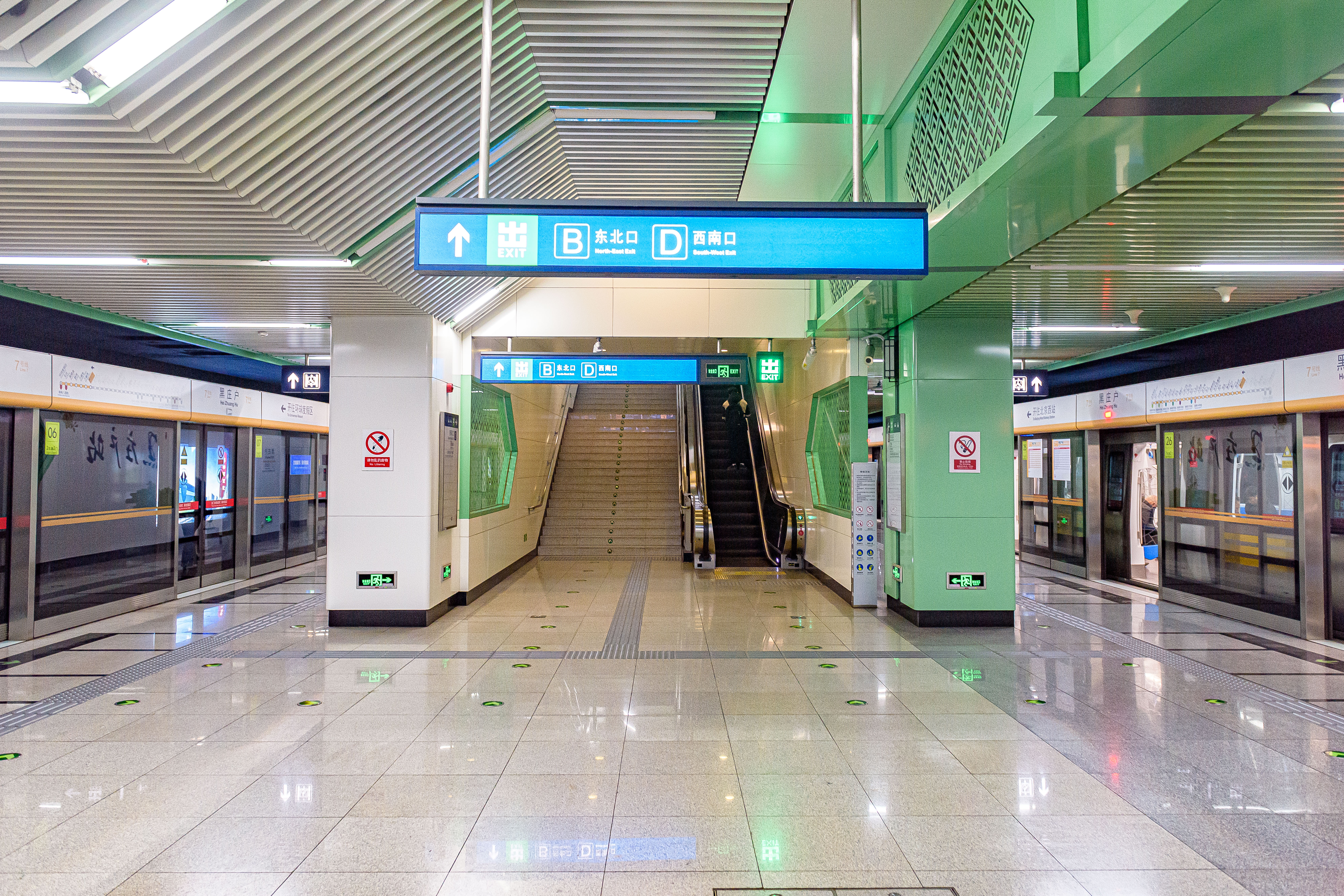
- Platform

General information
- Location: Wantong Road, Heizhuanghu Village, Heizhuanghu Township, Chaoyang District, Beijing; China
- Coordinates: 39.857742°N 116.595418°E
- Operator: Beijing Mass Transit Railway Operation Corporation Limited
- Line: Line 7
- Platforms: 2 (1 island platform)
- Tracks: 2

Construction
- Structure type: Underground
- Accessible: Yes

History
- Opened: December 28, 2019; 6 years ago

Services
| Preceding station | Beijing Subway | Following station |
|---|---|---|
| Langxinzhuang towards Beijing West railway station | Line 7 | Wanshengxi towards Universal Resort |
Location
- Location within Beijing

Heizhuanghu station (Chinese: 黑庄户站; pinyin: Hēizhuānghù zhàn) is a subway station on the Line 7 of the Beijing Subway.

== History ==
The station opened on December 28, 2019.

== Station layout ==
The station has an underground island platform.

== Exits ==
There are 2 exits, lettered B and D. Exit D is accessible. Exit D is located near Beijing Music Industrial Park.

== Gallery ==
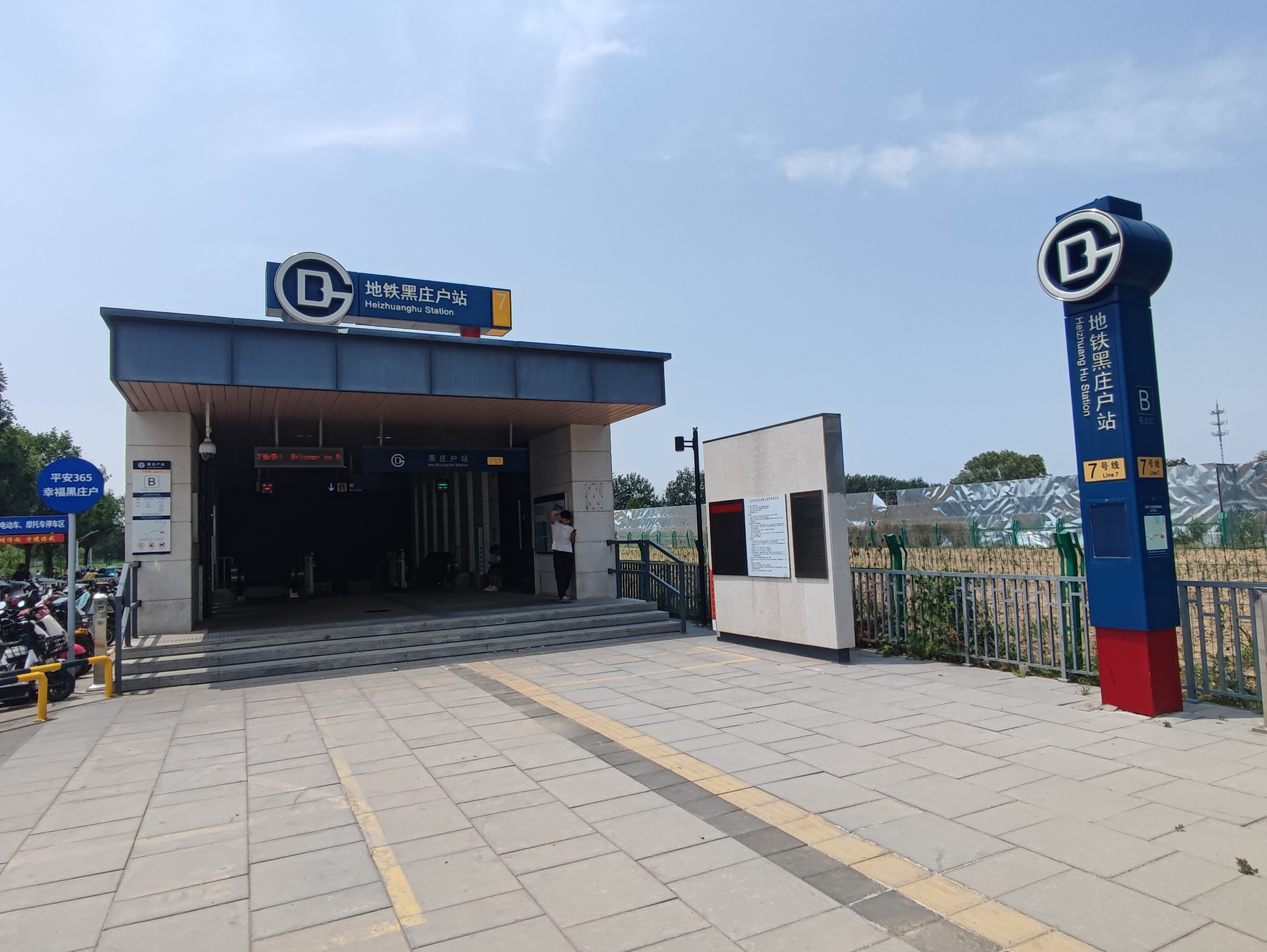
Exit B (June 2024)

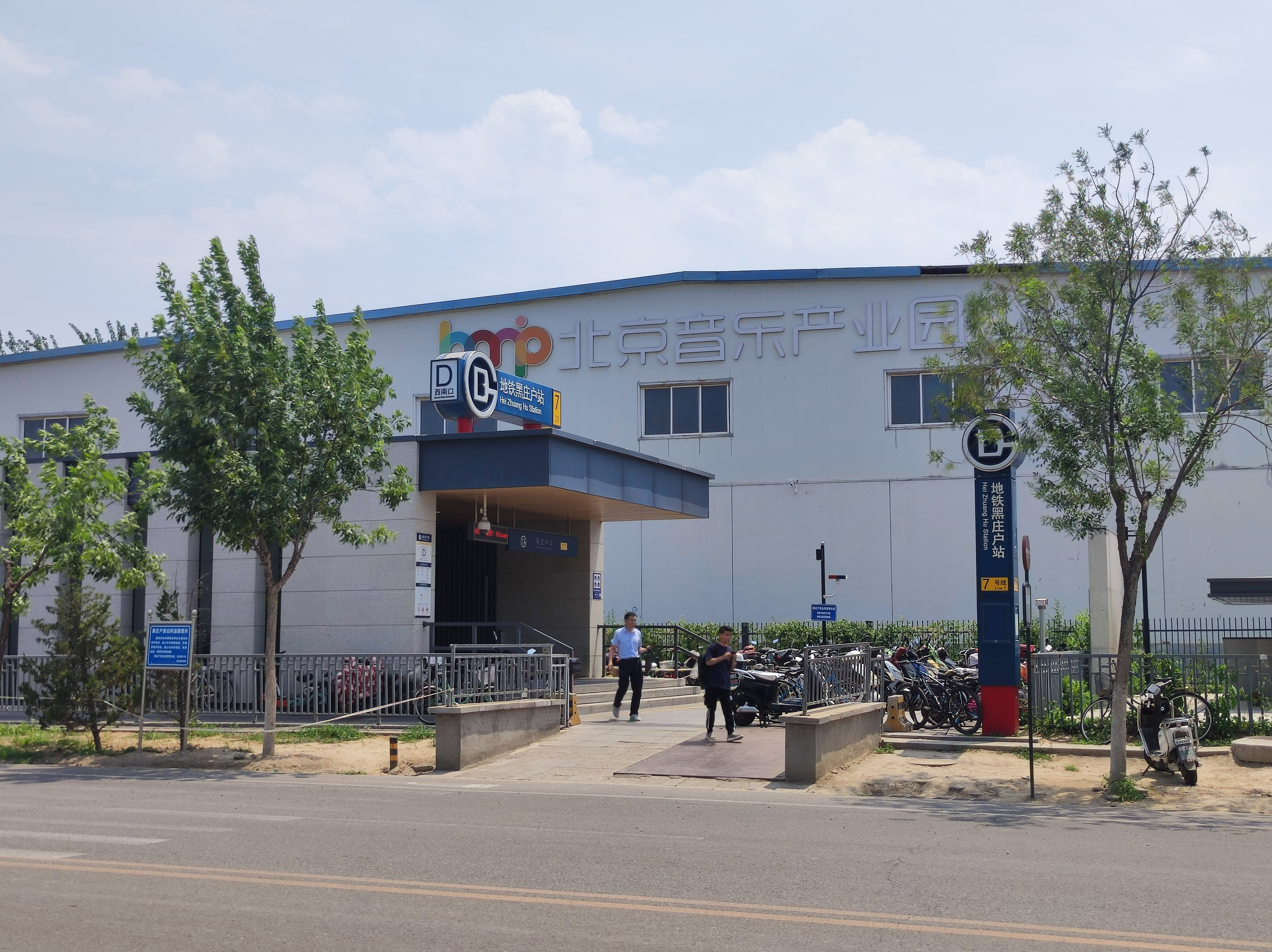
Exit D and Building of Beijing Music Industrial Park (June 2024)
