= Line 7 (Beijing Subway) =

Railway line in Beijing, China

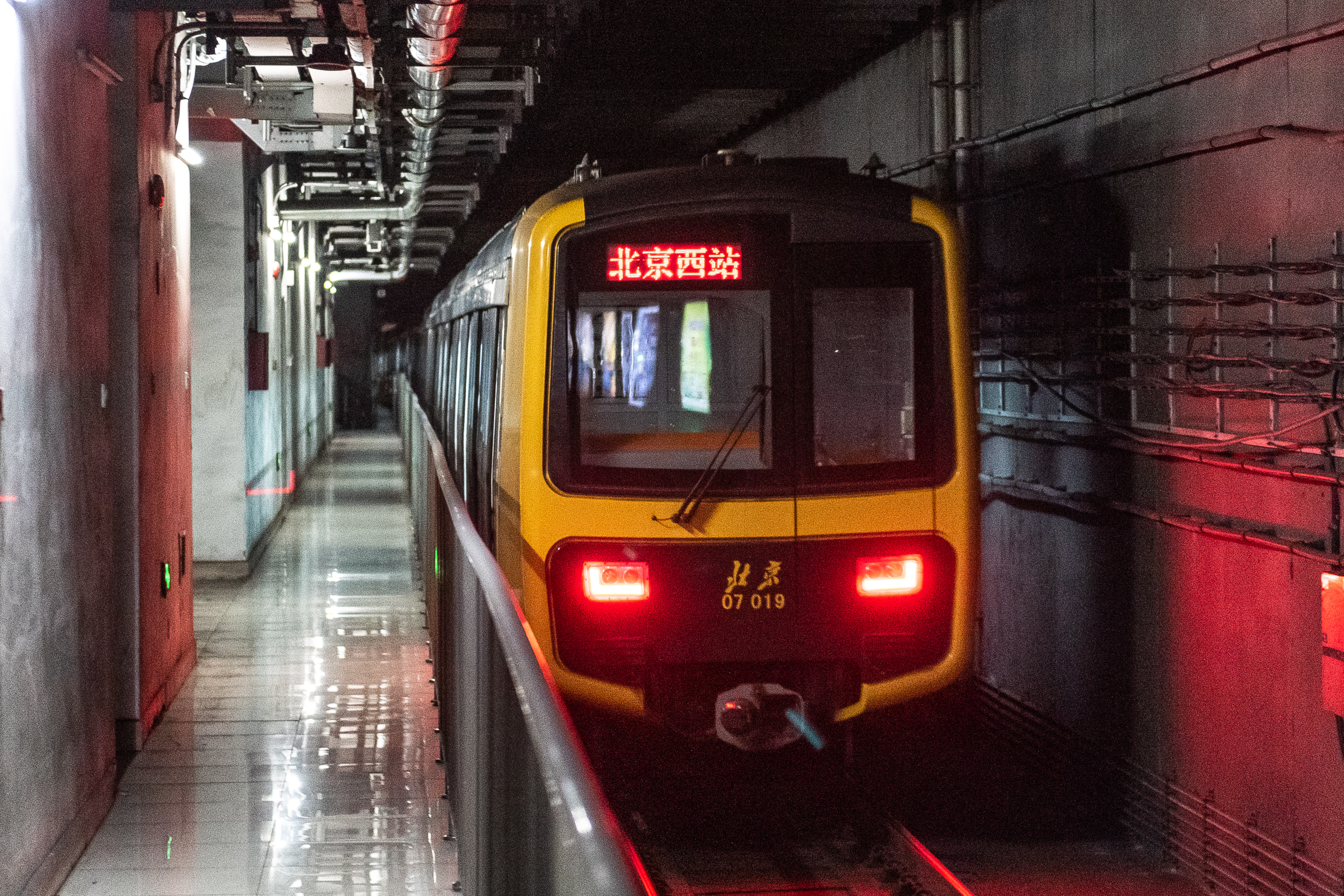
- Line 7 train leaving Caishi Kou station

Overview
- Other name: M7 (planned name)
- Native name: 7号线
- Status: Operational
- Locale: Tongzhou, Chaoyang, Dongcheng, Xicheng and Fengtai districts Beijing
- Termini: Beijing West railway station; Universal Resort
- Stations: 30

Service
- Type: Rapid transit
- System: Beijing Subway
- Operator: Beijing Mass Transit Railway Operation Corp., Ltd
- Depot(s): Jiaohuachang, Zhangjiawan
- Rolling stock: 8-car Type B (BD32)
- Daily ridership: 486,800 (2024 Avg.); 534,300 (2018 Peak)

History
- Opened: December 28, 2014; 11 years ago

Technical
- Line length: 40.3 km (25.0 mi)
- Character: Fully underground
- Track gauge: 1,435 mm (4 ft 8 1/2 in)
- Electrification: 1,500 V DC third rail
- Operating speed: 80 km/h (50 mph)

Line 7 of the Beijing Subway (Chinese: 北京地铁7号线; pinyin: běijīng dìtiě qīhàoxiàn) is a rapid transit line in Beijing. It runs parallel and to the south of Line 1 and Batong line, from the Beijing West railway station in Fengtai District to Universal Resort in Tongzhou District. Like Line 6, Line 7 provides additional relief to the overcapacity Line 1 adding another east–west trunk line to the Beijing Subway network. The line uses 8-car Type B trains. Line 7's color is cream.

== Stations ==
List of stations from west to east.

Station Name		Connections	Nearby Bus Stops	Distance km		Location
English	Chinese	Connections	Nearby Bus Stops	Distance km		Location
Beijing West railway station	北京西站	9 Sub-Central BXP	3 9 21 40 50 52 53 62 67 89 109 122 129 142 143 144 309 320 339 387 394 410 414 616 663 820 836 890 890区 917 917快 941 941快 968 982 997 快速直达专线52 夜5 夜8 夜23 夜36 专7 专138 专191	0.000	0.000	Fengtai
Wanzi	湾子		6 38 45 46 53 57 69 76 85 89 109 122 133 137 390 410 414 477 快速直达专线86 快速直达专线154 夜7 专138	0.935	0.935	Xicheng
Daguanying	达官营	16	6 38 45 46 53 57 69 76 80 85 109 122 133 137 390 410 477 夜7 专27 专138 专154 专191	0.734	1.669	Xicheng
Guang'anmen Nei	广安门内	19 (Out-of-system interchange via Niujie)	5 6 19 38 40 50 57 76 78 109 133 381 676 快速直达专线86 快速直达专线154 夜7	1.874	3.543	Xicheng
Caishi Kou	菜市口	4	5 6 48 57 83 102 105 109 144 381 夜4 夜7 专13	1.374	4.917	Xicheng
Hufangqiao	虎坊桥		5 6 7 14 15 23 34 48 57 66 102 105 夜7	0.885	5.802	Xicheng
Zhushikou	珠市口	8	2 5 23 48 57 59 66 93 120 141 622 观光1 夜2 夜7	1.205	7.007	Dongcheng / Xicheng
Qiaowan	桥湾		23 57 137 夜7	0.869	7.876	Dongcheng
Ciqi Kou	磁器口	5	17 23 39 41 57 60 84 106 108 128 137 599 夜7 夜24 夜28	1.016	8.892	Dongcheng
Guangqumen Nei	广渠门内		8 12 23 57 快速直达专线6 夜7	1.138	10.030	Dongcheng
Guangqumen Wai	广渠门外		23 57 312 637 夜7 夜29 专87 专165	1.332	11.362	Dongcheng / Chaoyang
Shuangjing	双井	10	23 28 54 57 72 98 300 300快 312 348 368 402 637 669 687 805快 848 938快 938快区 快速直达专线85 快速直达专线192 通医专线4 夜7 夜29 夜30 专10 专87 专165	1.241	12.603	Chaoyang
Jiulongshan	九龙山	14	11 23 35 54 312 348 486 513 561 605 669 973 985 快速直达专线85 快速直达专线192 通医专线4 夜7 夜29 专87	1.311	13.914	Chaoyang
Dajiaoting	大郊亭		11 23 31 35 138 312 348 400 400快 439 455 513 561 657 669 803 810快 865 快速直达专线85 快速直达专线174 快速直达专线192 夜29 夜34	0.781	14.695	Chaoyang
Baiziwan	百子湾		11 23 31 35 138 312 439 455 513 561 669 810快 快速直达专线85 快速直达专线174 快速直达专线192 夜29 专71	0.865	15.560	Chaoyang
Huagong	化工		561	0.903	16.463	Chaoyang
Nanlouzi Zhuang	南楼梓庄		31 34 41 348 457 486 535 561 637 657 通医专线4 夜19 夜34	1.464	17.927	Chaoyang
Happy Valley	欢乐谷景区		31 41 561 通医专线4 夜34 专166	0.906	18.833	Chaoyang
Fatou	垡头		348 457 486 561 637 夜19 专166	1.679	20.512	Chaoyang
Shuanghe	双合		348 457 486 561 637 夜19	1.304	21.816	Chaoyang
Jiaohua Chang	焦化厂		348 457 486 637 638 夜19	1.021	22.837	Chaoyang
Huangchang	黄厂		348 457 专170	1.678	24.515	Chaoyang
Langxinzhuang	郎辛庄		363 411 657 专171 专172	1.752	26.267	Chaoyang
Heizhuanghu	黑庄户		397 532	2.517	28.784	Chaoyang
Wanshengxi	万盛西		552 649 T11 T12 T15 T25 T68 T68区 T87	2.961	31.745	Tongzhou
Wanshengdong	万盛东		342 372 913 T7 T10 T18 T65 T109 T116 T118 通医专线9	2.110	33.855	Tongzhou
Qunfang	群芳		435 T112	1.160	35.015	Tongzhou
Gaoloujin	高楼金		589 T4 T53 T62 T68 T102 T112	1.195	36.210	Tongzhou
Huazhuang	花庄	Batong	589 806 T14 T34 T40 T43 T53 T68 T72 T73 T90 T101 T102 T103 T116	1.425	37.635	Tongzhou
Universal Resort	环球度假区	Batong	589 T116	1.769	39.404	Tongzhou

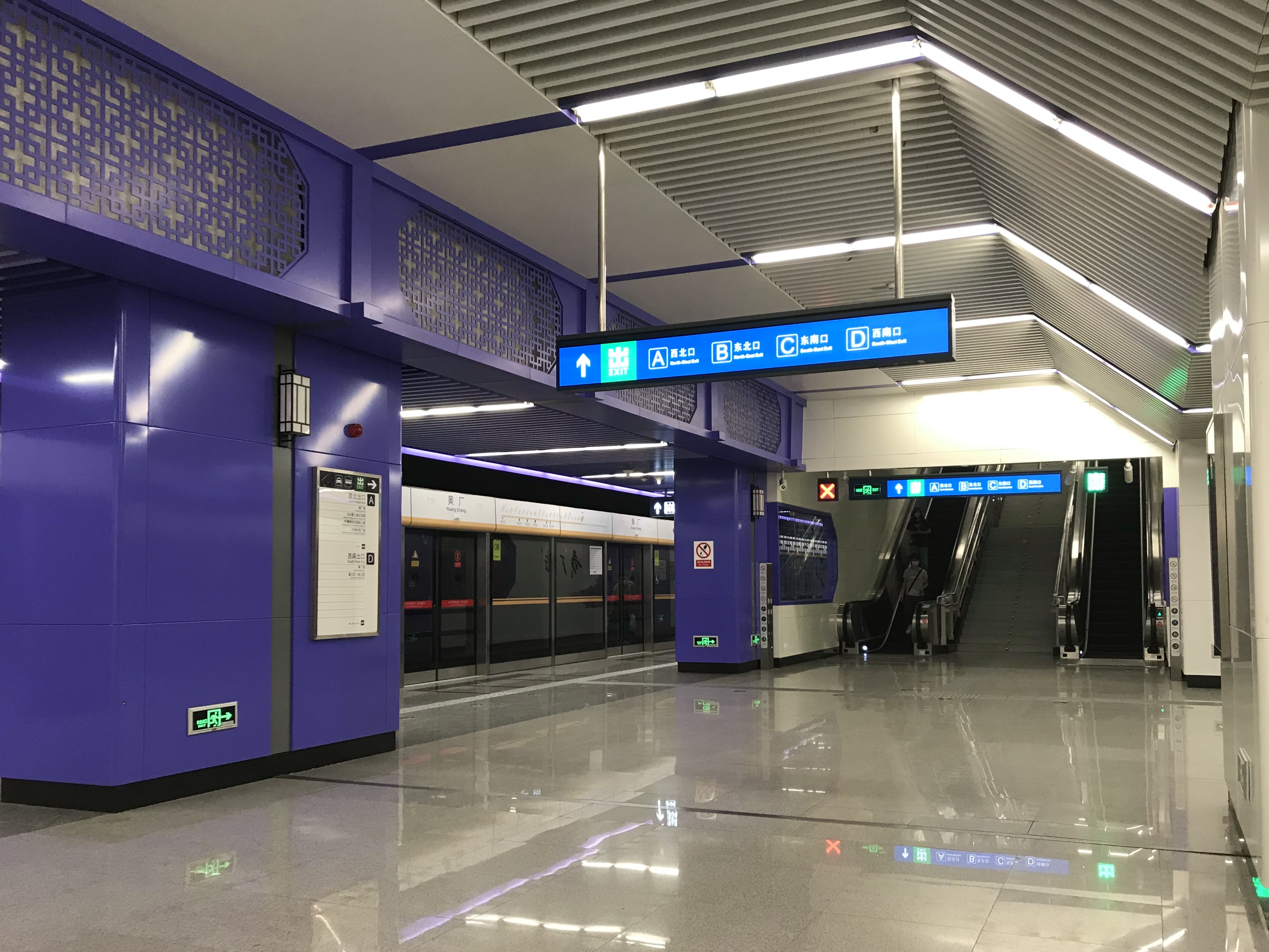
Huangchang Station

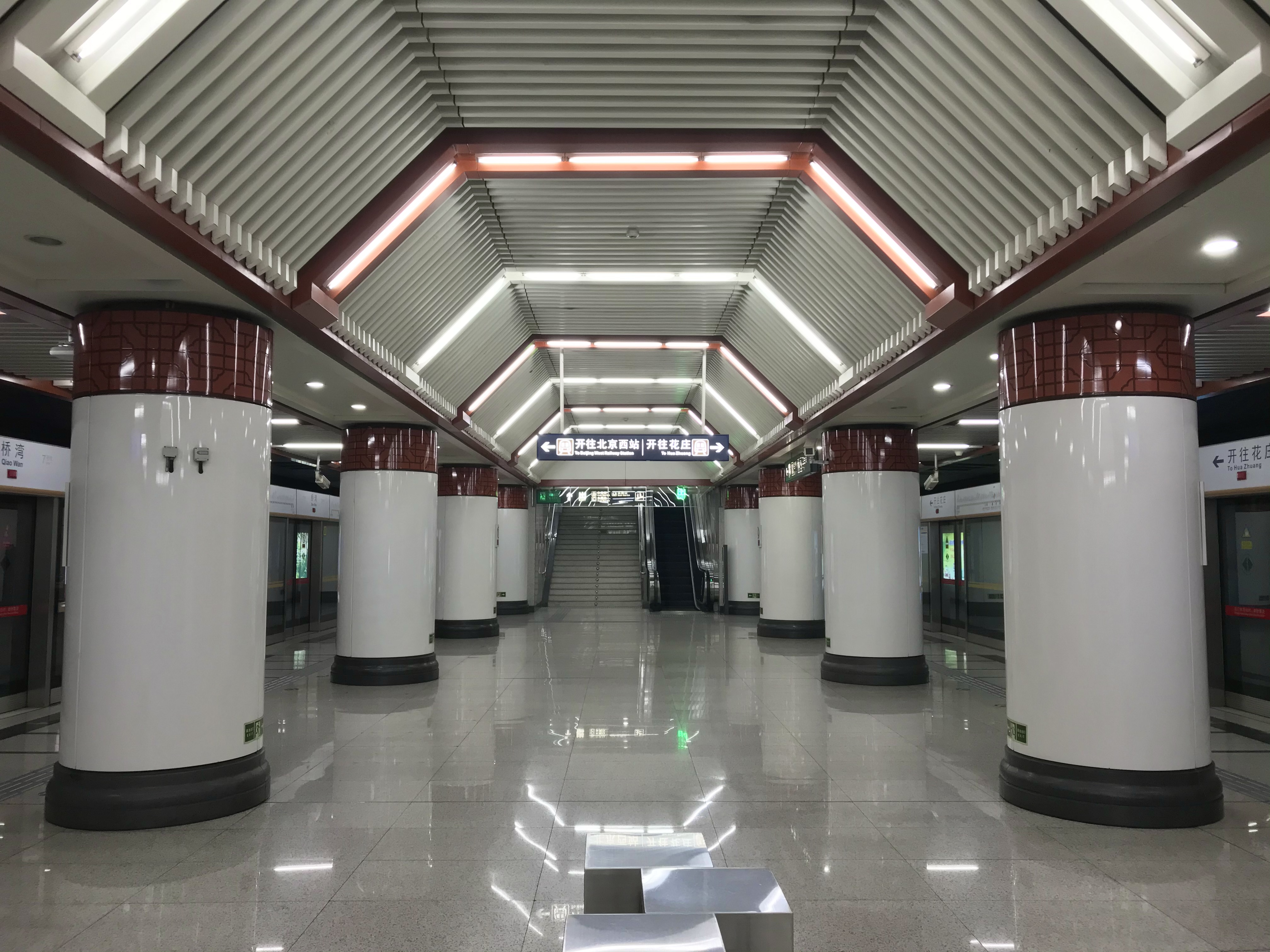
Qiaowan Station

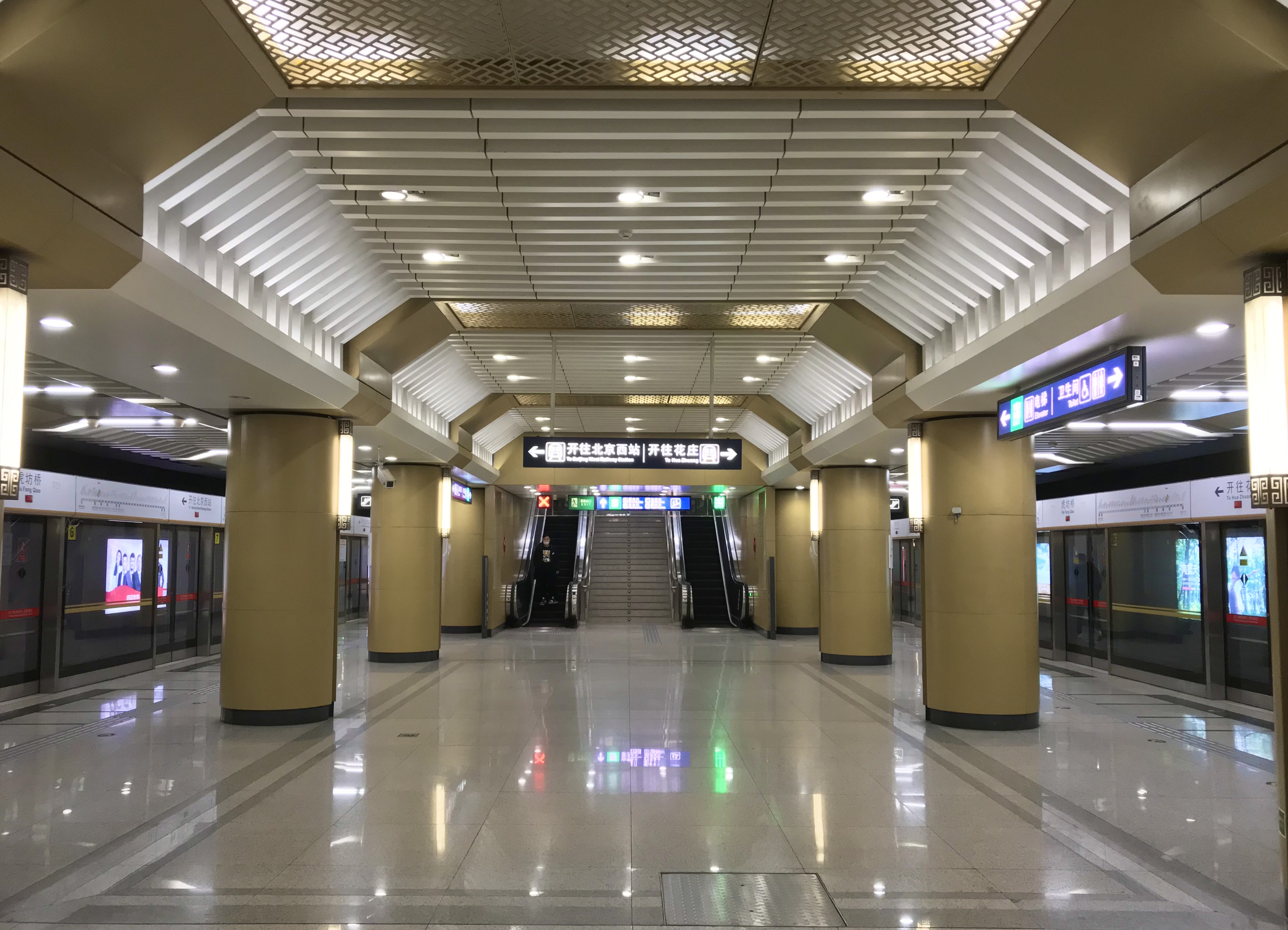
Hufangqiao Station

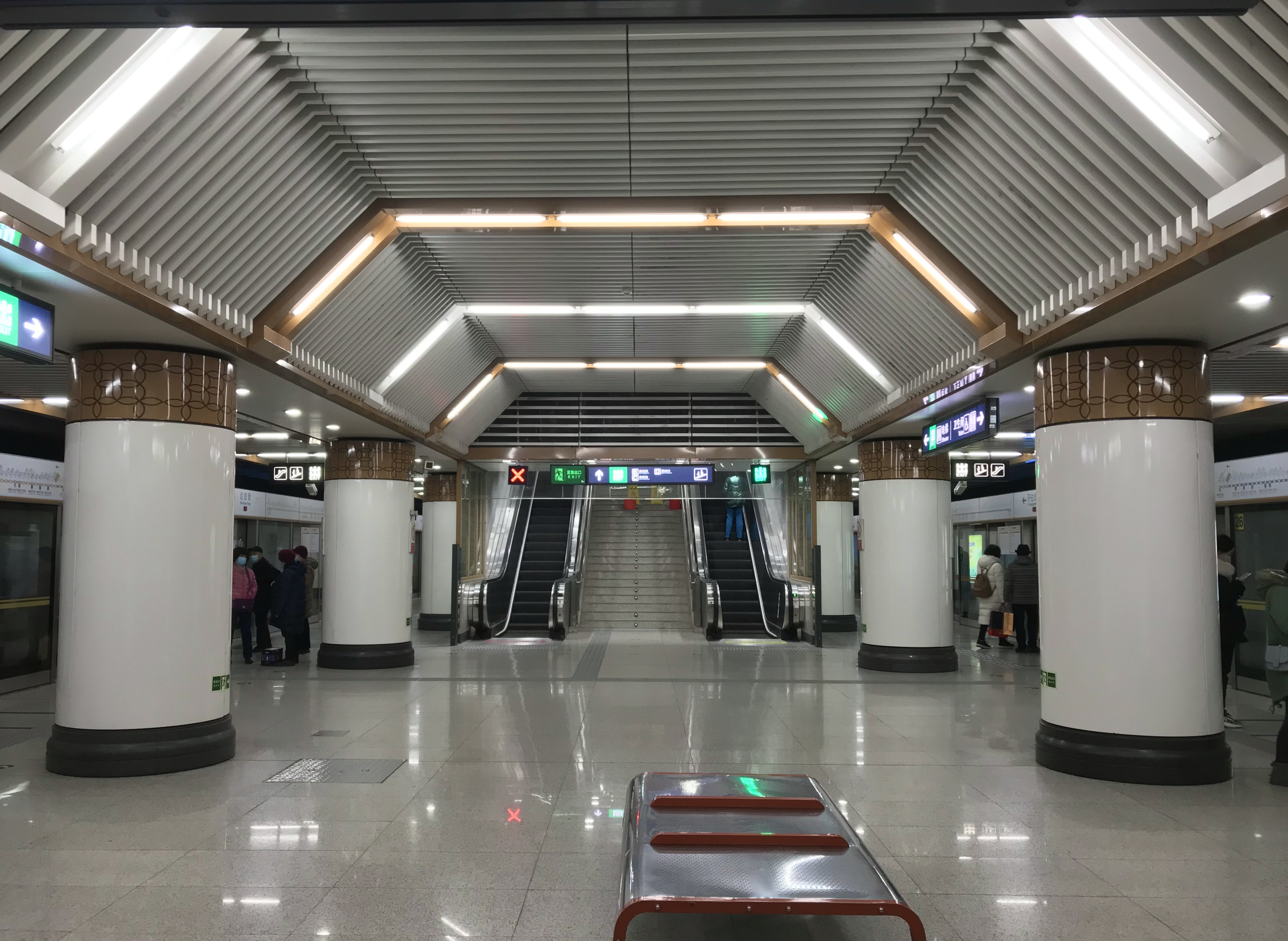
Daguanying Station

== Planning ==
Line 6 was originally conceived in 1973 as a "pan-handle" shaped route incorporating the central sections of today's Lines 6 and 7. In 1983 Line 6 was dissolved into two distinct lines. The section under Guang'anmen, Luomashi, Zhushikou and Guangqumen Streets and the "handle" branch to Fengtai became Line 7. The rest of the loop with a new south eastern extension to what was at the time the Beijing Jiaohuachang (Coking Plant) complex became Line 6. Line 7 was later revised westward to terminate at a new major railway station called Beijing West railway station and Line 9 taking over servicing Fengtai. When Beijing West railway station started construction in the early 1990s space was set aside for a subway station allowing cross-platform interchange for the future Lines 7 and 9. By 1993 the planned section of Line 6 heading to Jiaohuachang was revised as an eastern extension of Line 7, forming the alignment built today.

Line 7 was originally slated to have 15 stations, from the Beijing West railway station to Baiziwan. A revised plan approved by the Planning Committee of the Beijing Municipal government called for 21 stations over 23.7 km (14.7 mi), ending in Jiaohuachang.

In 2013, planners revised the design of Line 7 from using the standard 6 car trains to 8 car trains after performing a detailed transport study of the Fatou area. Fatou's population projections were upgraded from 100,000 to 220,000 people and be a significant employment hub in the future. Planners decided that 6 cars trains would have insufficient capacity for the new demand projections. Line 7 was originally planned to use 1500 V DC overhead lines to power the longer subway trains. However, the already completed platforms at Beijing West railway station assumed the line would use a 750 V DC 3rd rail system like Beijing's legacy subway lines and built with vertical clearance for such. The line ultimately used a 1500 V DC 3rd rail system as a compromise.

On 8 July 2022, an EIA document regarding Phase III construction of Beijing rail transport system (2022–2027) announced the Phase III of Line 7, from Beijing West Railway station to Wanshousi, it will be a 6.4 km long section with 4 new stations. These are confirmed in the tender announcements published on 8 July 2024.

== History ==
=== Phase 1 ===
Construction began in January 2010. Test runs started in September 2014 with full operation beginning on December 28, 2014.

=== Eastern extension (Phase 2) ===
The eastern extension runs through Chaoyang and Tongzhou Districts. The extension adds 9 new stations and 16.6 km (10.3 mi) of new line. The extension is fully underground. It was opened on December 28, 2019. Universal Resort station opened on August 26, 2021.

=== Timeline ===
- January 8, 2008: Plans for Line 7 reported in the media. Construction scheduled to begin by the end of the year.
- October 30, 2008: Line 7 route plan with 23 stations receive regulatory approval. Construction still scheduled to begin by end of the year.
- July 19, 2009: Construction on Line 7 announced to begin in late August 2009.
- November 6, 2009: Commencement of Line 7 construction deferred to 2010.
- January 19, 2010: Construction reportedly begun along Guangqu Road near the easternmost section of the line.
- December 28, 2014: Operations of Phase I of Line 7 begin, except for Shuangjing station and Fatou station.
- December 30, 2018: An infill station of Phase I, Fatou station was opened.
- December 28, 2019: Operations of Phase II of Line 7 begin, except for Universal Resort station. An infill station of Phase I, Shuangjing station was opened.
- August 26, 2021: Extended to Universal Resort station.

Segment	Commencement	Length	Station(s)	Name
Beijing West Railway Station — Jiaohuachang	28 December 2014	23.7 km (14.7 mi)	19	Phase 1
Fatou	30 December 2018	infill station	1	Phase 1
Shuangjing	28 December 2019	infill station	1	Phase 1
Jiaohuachang — Huazhuang	28 December 2019	16.6 km (10.3 mi)	8	Phase 2 (Eastern extension)
Huazhuang — Universal Resort	26 August 2021	16.6 km (10.3 mi)	1	Phase 2 (Eastern extension)

== Rolling Stock ==
Model	Image	Manufacturer	Year built	Amount in Service	Fleet numbers	Depot
BD32		Beijing Subway Rolling Stock Equipment	2013	68	07 001–07 068	Jiaohuachang; Zhangjiawan
