= Huangchang station =

Beijing Subway station

Huangchang 黄厂
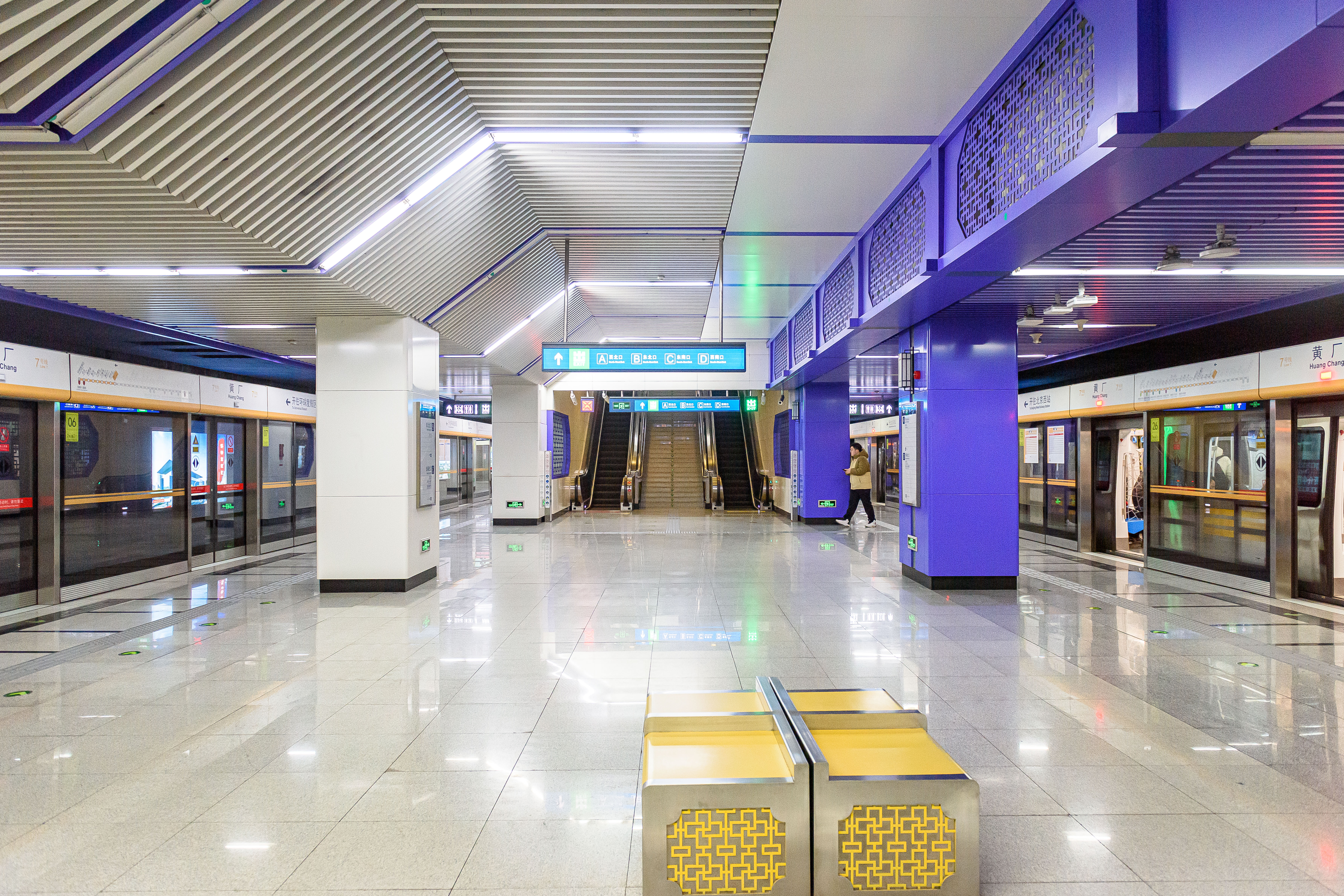
- Platform

General information
- Location: Huangchang Village, Dougezhuang Township, Chaoyang District, Beijing; China
- Coordinates: 39°50′52″N 116°32′51″E
- Operator: Beijing Mass Transit Railway Operation Corporation Limited
- Line: Line 7
- Platforms: 2 (1 island platform)
- Tracks: 2

Construction
- Structure type: Underground
- Accessible: Yes

History
- Opened: December 28, 2019; 6 years ago

Services
Preceding station	Beijing Subway	Following station
Jiaohua Chang towards Beijing West railway station	Line 7	Langxinzhuang towards Universal Resort
Location
- Location within Beijing

Huangchang station (Chinese: 黄厂站) is a subway station on the Line 7 of the Beijing Subway.

== History ==
The station project was formerly called Huangchangcun station. In May 2019, the Beijing Municipal Commission of Planning and Natural Resources proposed a naming plan for the stations of the eastern extension of Line 7, and they planned to name it Huang Chang station. On November 20, 2019, the station was officially named Huang Chang station. The station opened on December 28, 2019.

== Station layout ==
The station has an underground island platform.

== Exits ==
There are 4 exits, lettered A, B, C, and D. Exits A and C are accessible.
