= Fatou station =

Beijing Subway station

Fatou 垡头
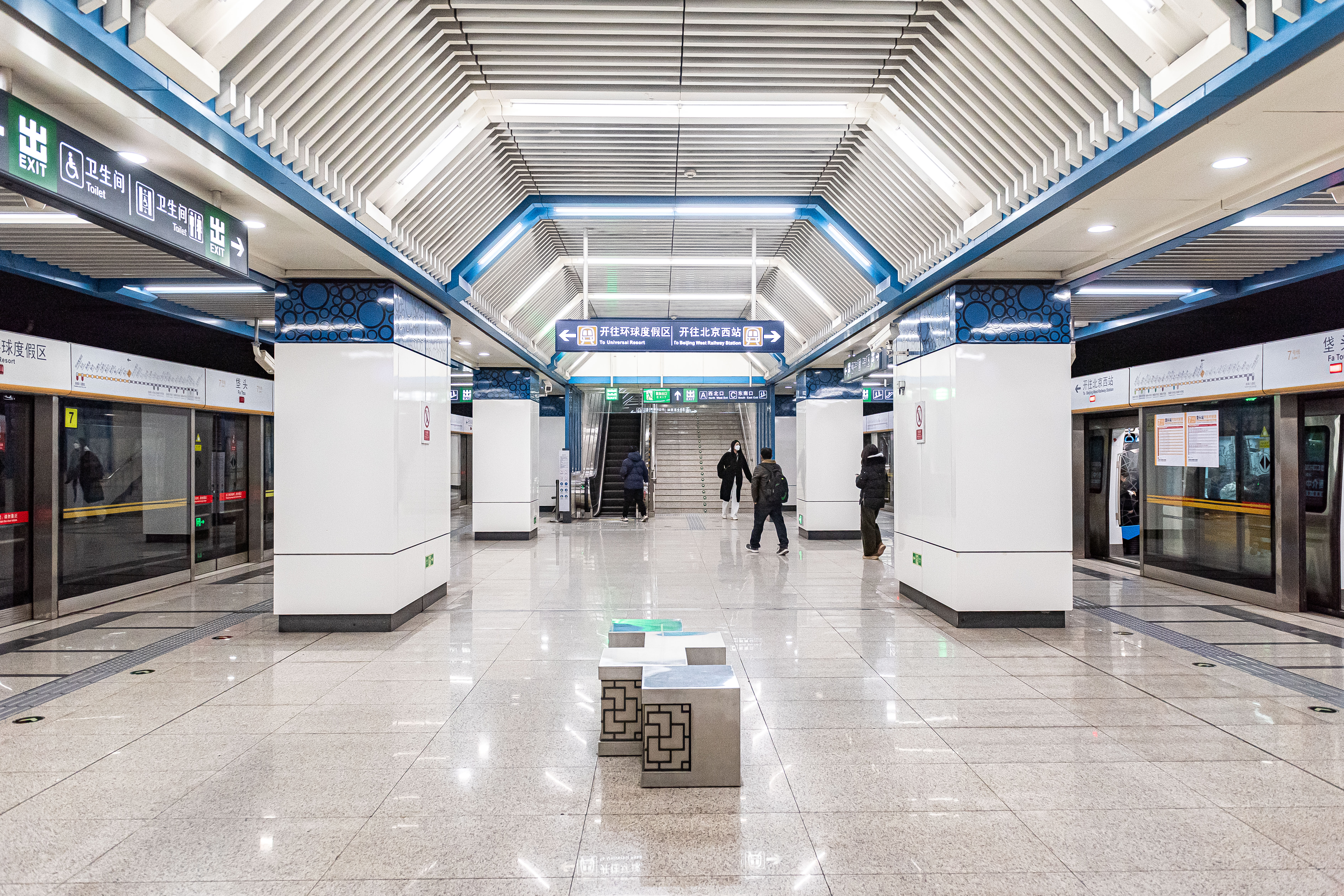
- Platform

General information
- Location: Intersection of Fatou Road (垡头路) and Fatou East Street (垡头东街); Chaoyang District, Beijing; China
- Coordinates: 39.864082°N 116.513817°E
- Operator: Beijing Mass Transit Railway Operation Corporation Limited
- Line: Line 7
- Platforms: 2 (1 island platform)
- Tracks: 2

Construction
- Structure type: Underground
- Accessible: Yes

History
- Opened: 30 December 2018

Services
Preceding station	Beijing Subway	Following station
Happy Valley towards Beijing West railway station	Line 7	Shuanghe towards Universal Resort
Location
- Location within Beijing

Fatou station (simplified Chinese: 垡头站; traditional Chinese: 垡頭站; pinyin: Fátóu Zhàn) is a station on Line 7 of the Beijing Subway. It was opened on 30 December 2018.

The adjacent stations are Happy Valley to the northwest and Shuanghe to the east.

The station is located in Chaoyang District, at the intersection of Fatou Road (垡头路) and Fatou East Street (垡头东街).

== History ==
The station's platforms were completed on 28 December 2014, along with the rest of the initial section of Line 7, but, due to the need to clear space at the surface for station entrances, the station has remained unopened and trains pass through without stopping at Fatou. In November 2017, the Beijing Municipal Commission of Housing and Urban Rural Development, and the Beijing Daily, both stated they expected the station to be operational by the end of 2018. It was opened on 30 December 2018.

== Station layout ==
The station has an underground island platform.

== Exits ==
There are 2 exits, lettered A and C. Exit C is accessible.
