= Langxinzhuang station =

Beijing Subway station

Langxinzhuang 郎辛庄
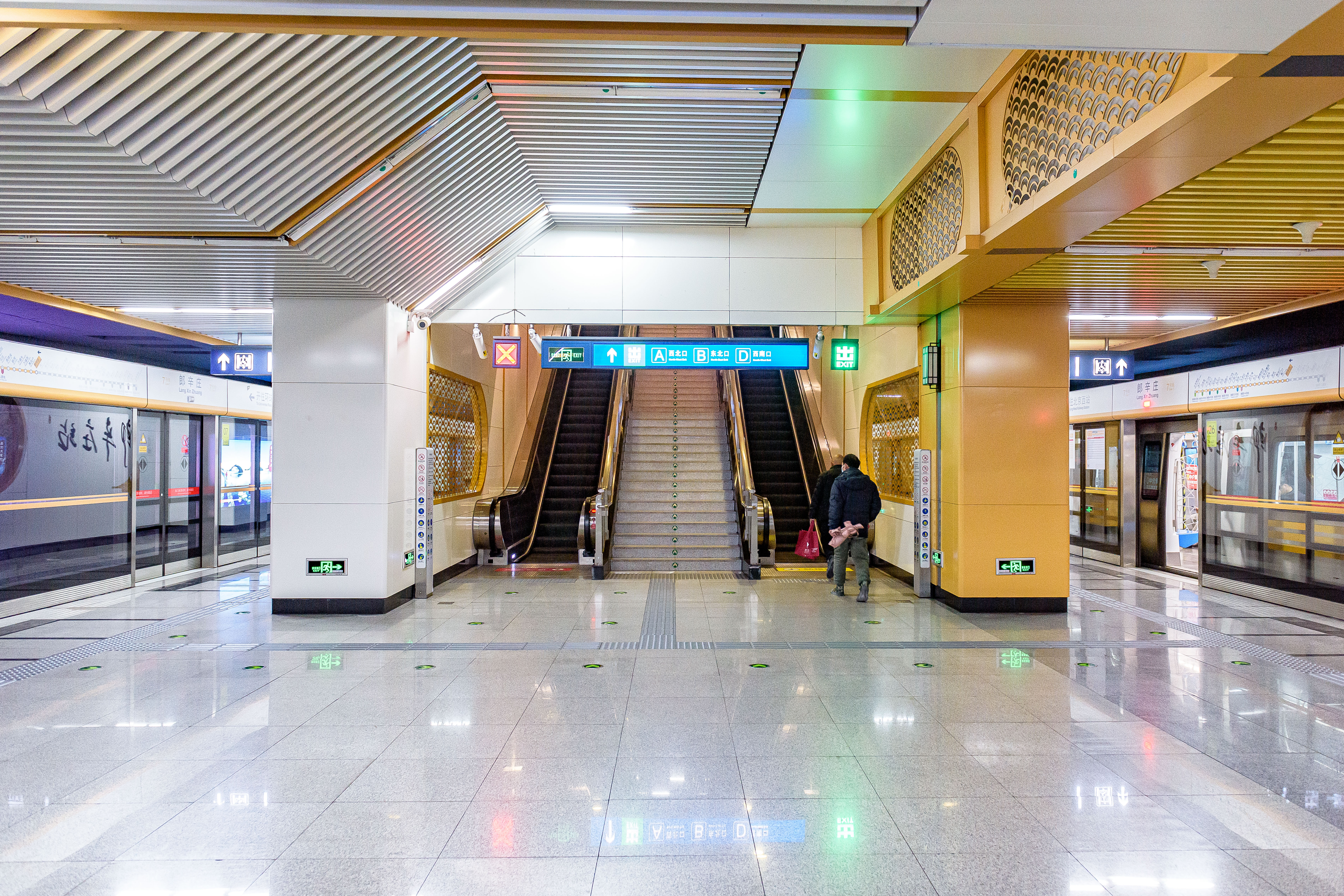
- Platform

General information
- Location: Langxinzhuang Village, Heizhuanghu Township, Chaoyang District, Beijing; China
- Coordinates: 39.855461°N 116.564144°E
- Operator: Beijing Mass Transit Railway Operation Corporation Limited
- Line: Line 7
- Platforms: 2 (1 island platform)
- Tracks: 2

Construction
- Structure type: Underground
- Accessible: Yes

History
- Opened: December 28, 2019; 6 years ago

Services
| Preceding station | Beijing Subway | Following station |
|---|---|---|
| Huangchang towards Beijing West railway station | Line 7 | Heizhuanghu towards Universal Resort |
Location
- Location within Beijing

Langxinzhuang station (Chinese: 郎辛庄站) is a subway station on the Line 7 of the Beijing Subway.

== History ==
The station was formerly called Dougezhuang station. In May 2019, the Beijing Municipal Commission of Planning and Natural Resources proposed a naming plan for the stations of the eastern extension of Line 7, and they planned to name it Lang Xin Zhuang station. On November 20, 2019, the station was officially named Lang Xin Zhuang station. The station opened on December 28, 2019.

== Station layout ==
The station has an underground island platform.

== Exits ==
There are 3 exits, lettered A, B, and D. Exit A is accessible.
