= Shuanghe station =

Beijing Subway station

Shuanghe 双合
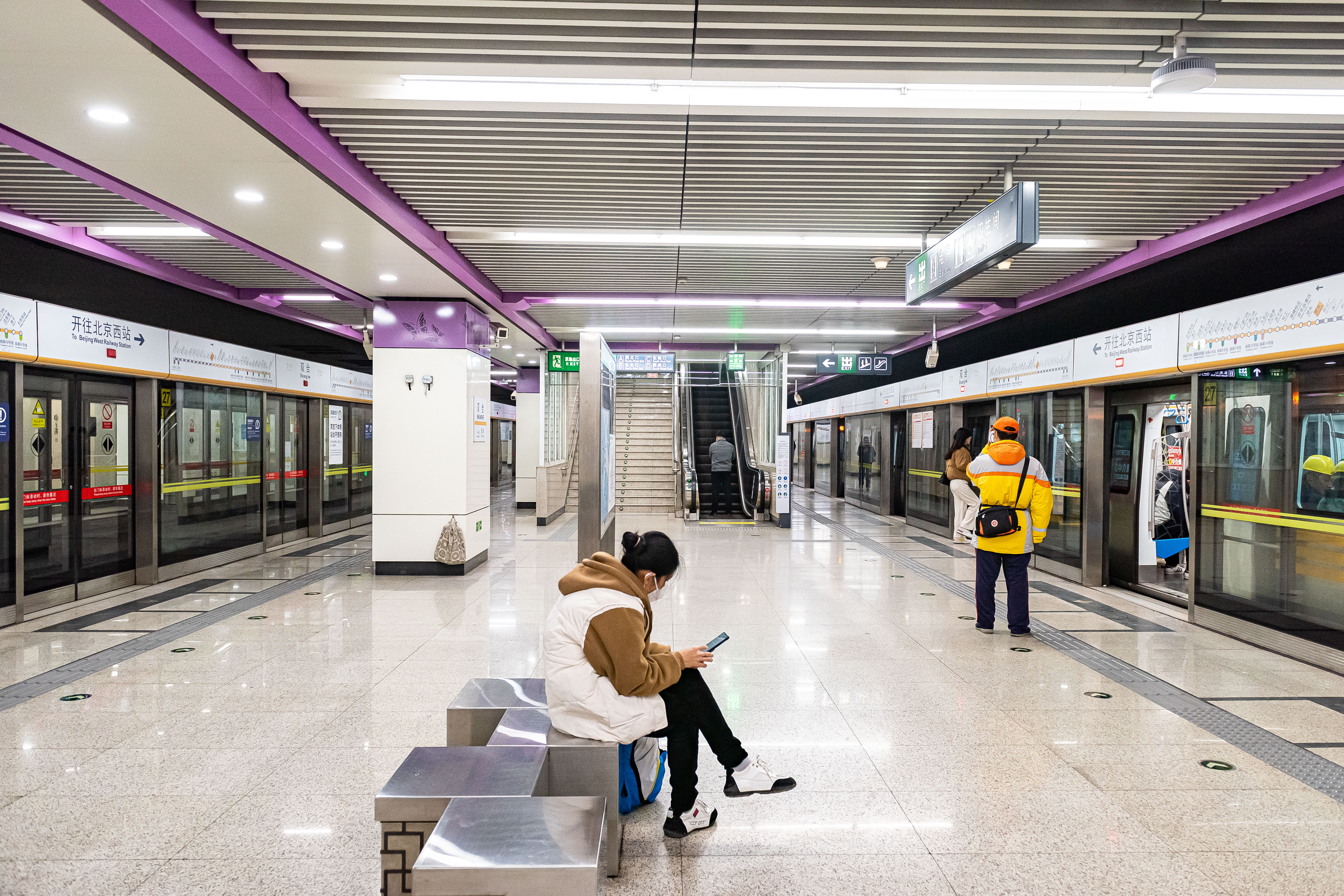
- Westbound platform

General information
- Location: Chaoyang District, Beijing; China
- Coordinates: 39°51′35″N 116°31′37″E
- Operator: Beijing Mass Transit Railway Operation Corporation Limited
- Line: Line 7
- Platforms: 4 (2 island platforms)
- Tracks: 3

Construction
- Structure type: Underground
- Accessible: Yes

History
- Opened: December 28, 2014; 11 years ago

Services
Preceding station	Beijing Subway	Following station
Fatou towards Beijing West railway station	Line 7	Jiaohua Chang towards Universal Resort
Location
- Location within Beijing

Shuanghe Station (simplified Chinese: 双合站; traditional Chinese: 雙合站; pinyin: Shuānghé Zhàn) is a station on Line 7 of the Beijing Subway. It was opened on December 28, 2014 as a part of the stretch between Beijing West railway station and Jiaohua Chang and is located between Fatou to the northwest and Jiaohua Chang to the southeast.

== Station layout ==
The station has underground dual-island platforms with a track in the middle.

== Exits ==
There are 4 exits, lettered A, B, C, and D. Exit B is accessible.
