= Shuangjing station =

Beijing Subway station

Shuangjing 双井
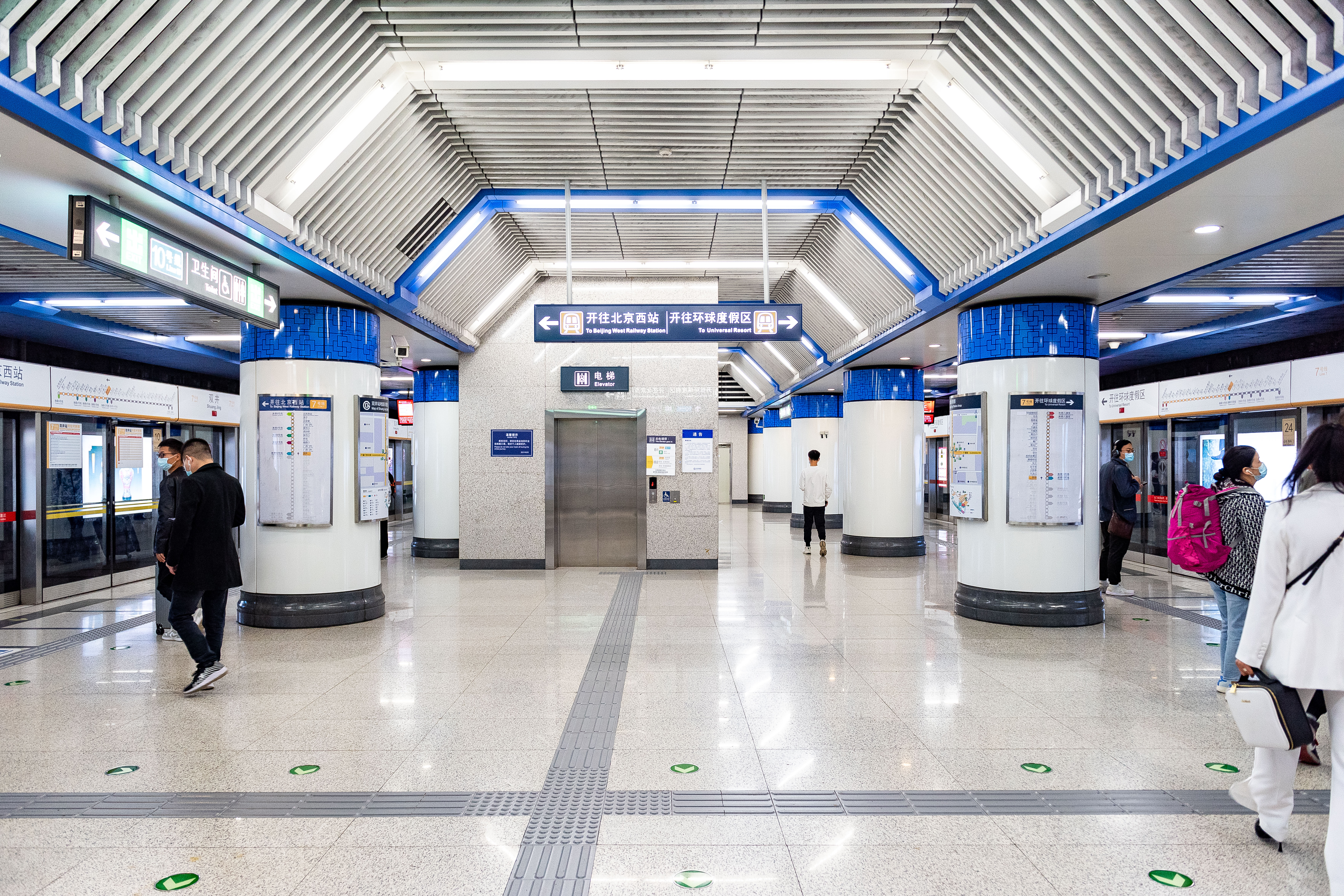
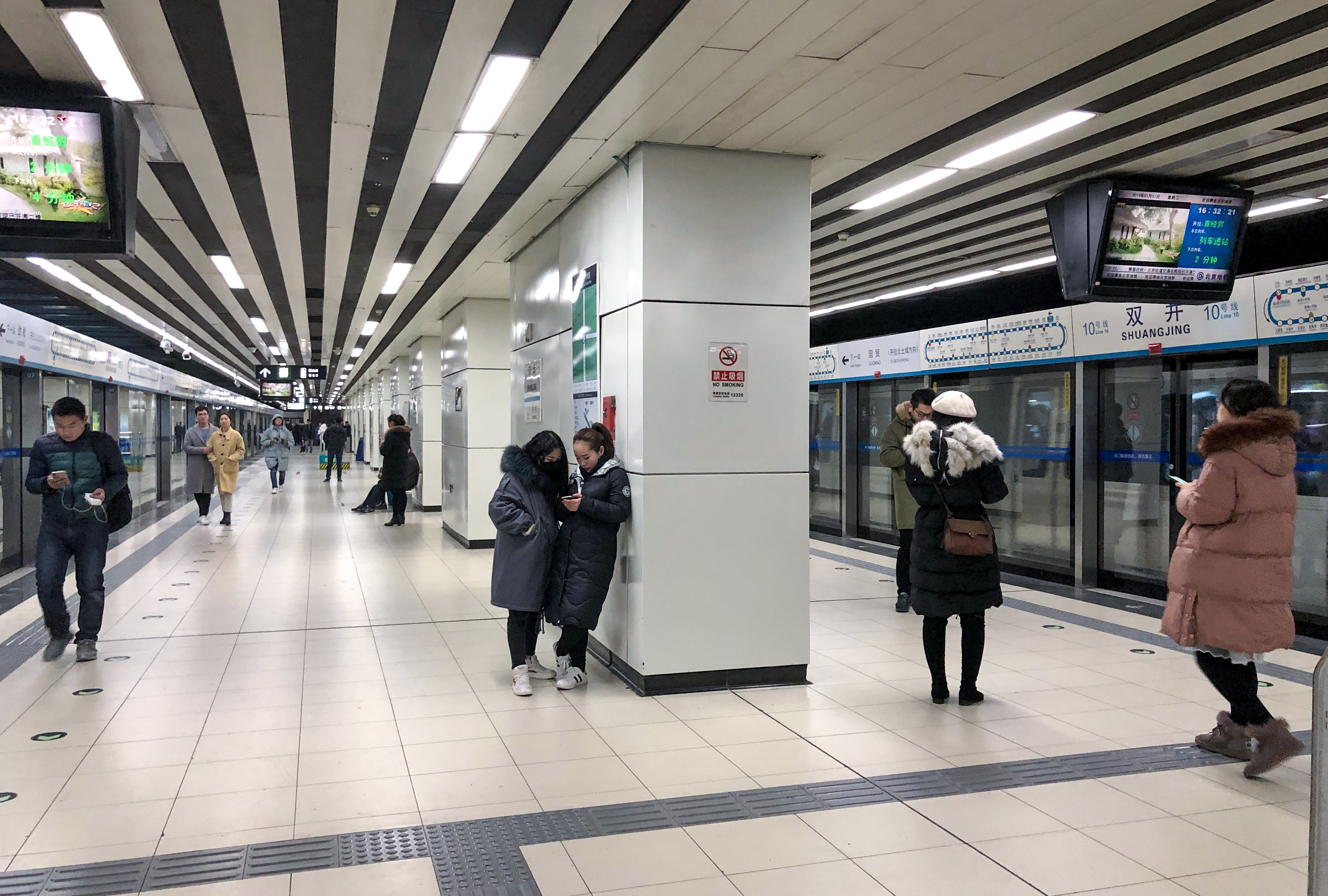
- Line 7 platform Line 10 platform

General information
- Location: Shuangjing Subdistrict, Chaoyang District, Beijing; China
- Coordinates: 39.893479°N 116.460627°E
- Operator: Beijing Mass Transit Railway Operation Corporation Limited
- Lines: Line 7; Line 10
- Platforms: 4 (2 island platforms)
- Tracks: 4

Construction
- Structure type: Underground
- Accessible: Yes

History
- Opened: July 19, 2008; 18 years ago (Line 10); December 28, 2019; 6 years ago (Line 7)

Services
Preceding station	Beijing Subway	Following station
Guangqumen Wai towards Beijing West railway station	Line 7	Jiulongshan towards Universal Resort
Guomao outer loop / anticlockwise	Line 10	Jingsong inner loop / clockwise
Location
- Location within Beijing

Shuangjing Station (simplified Chinese: 双井站; traditional Chinese: 雙井站; pinyin: Shuāngjǐng Zhàn) is a subway station on Line 7 and Line 10 of the Beijing Subway, located in Shuangjing Subdistrict, Chaoyang District.

== Description ==
The station is one of Beijing's busiest, having handled a peak entry and exit traffic of 100,000 people on May 5, 2013. The station has full platform doors inside. Exit A leads directly into the basement of the Viva Mall.

== History ==
Shuangjing station was designated to be the interchange between Line 7 and Line 10. However, the Line 10 platforms were not originally designed to handle additional interchange traffic. At around 10 meters wide, the single center platform is one of the narrowest on Line 10. Beijing Subway authorities determined that the narrow platform will not be able to serve the large transfer volumes between Lines 7 and 10. Therefore, on December 28, 2014 when Line 7 opened, trains on Line 7 did not stop at this station even though the station's Line 7 platforms are complete.

Plans were completed for a new interchange hall in the northeast corner of Shuangjing Overpass, and an underground transfer corridor on the south side of the Third Ring Road Overpass. Construction started in February 2019. The platforms for Line 7 opened on December 28, 2019 along with a new transfer passage and interchange hall.

== Station layout ==
Both the line 7 and 10 stations have underground island platforms.

== Exits ==
There are 5 exits, lettered A, B, F, G, and H. Exit F is accessible.

== Gallery ==
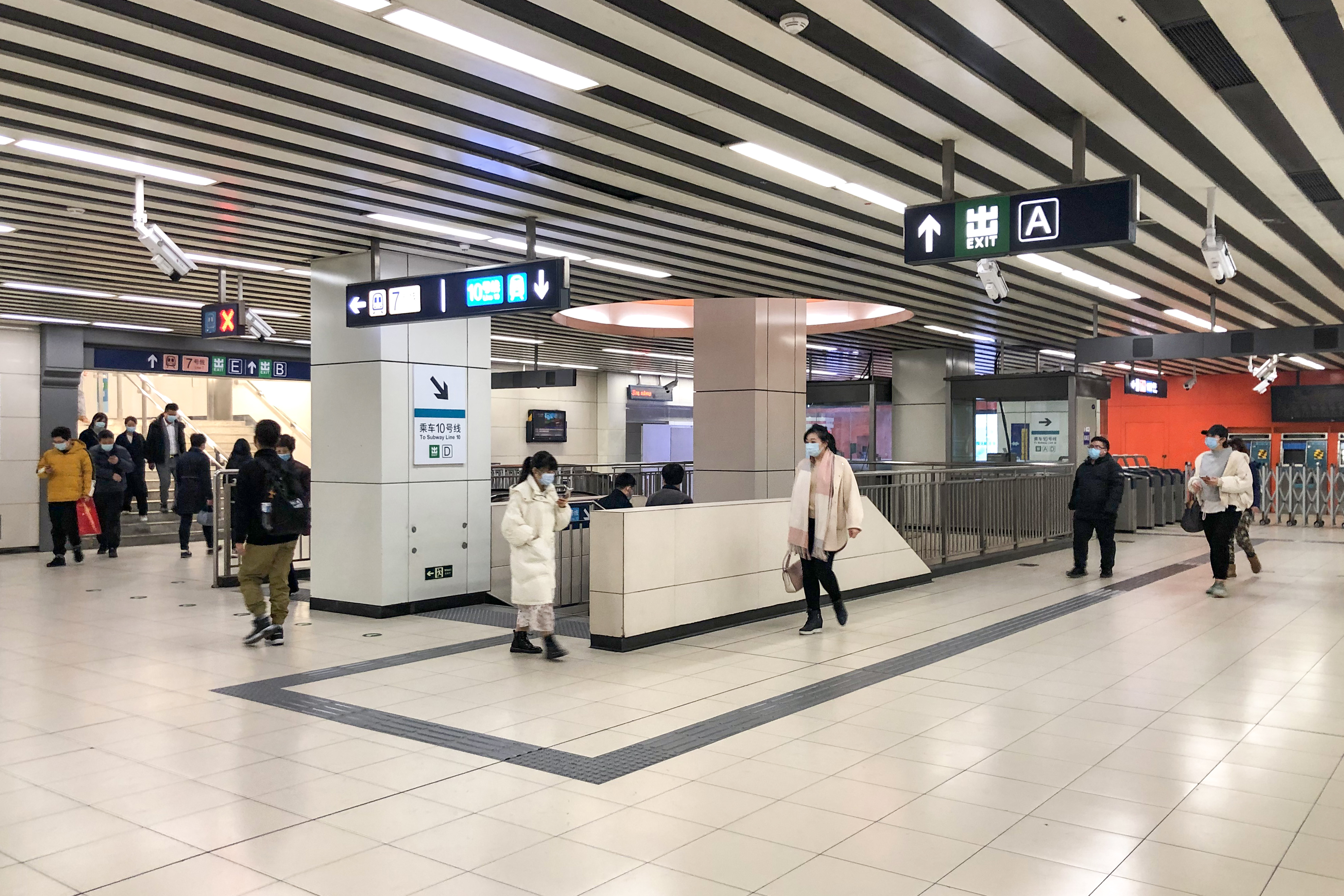
Line 10 north concourse

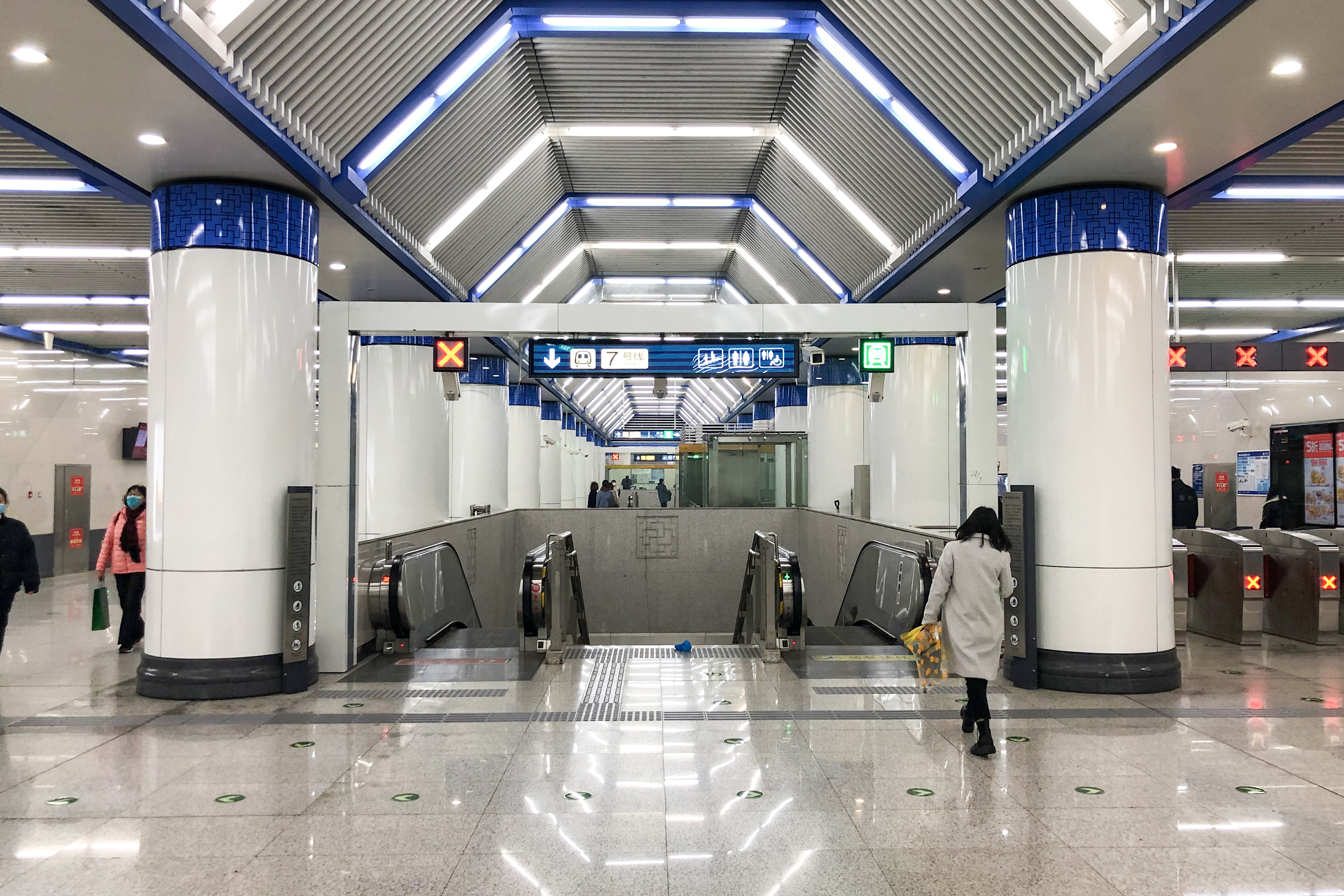
Line 7 concourse
