= Shuangjing Subdistrict, Beijing =

Shuangjing Subdistrict 双井街道
- Subdistrict
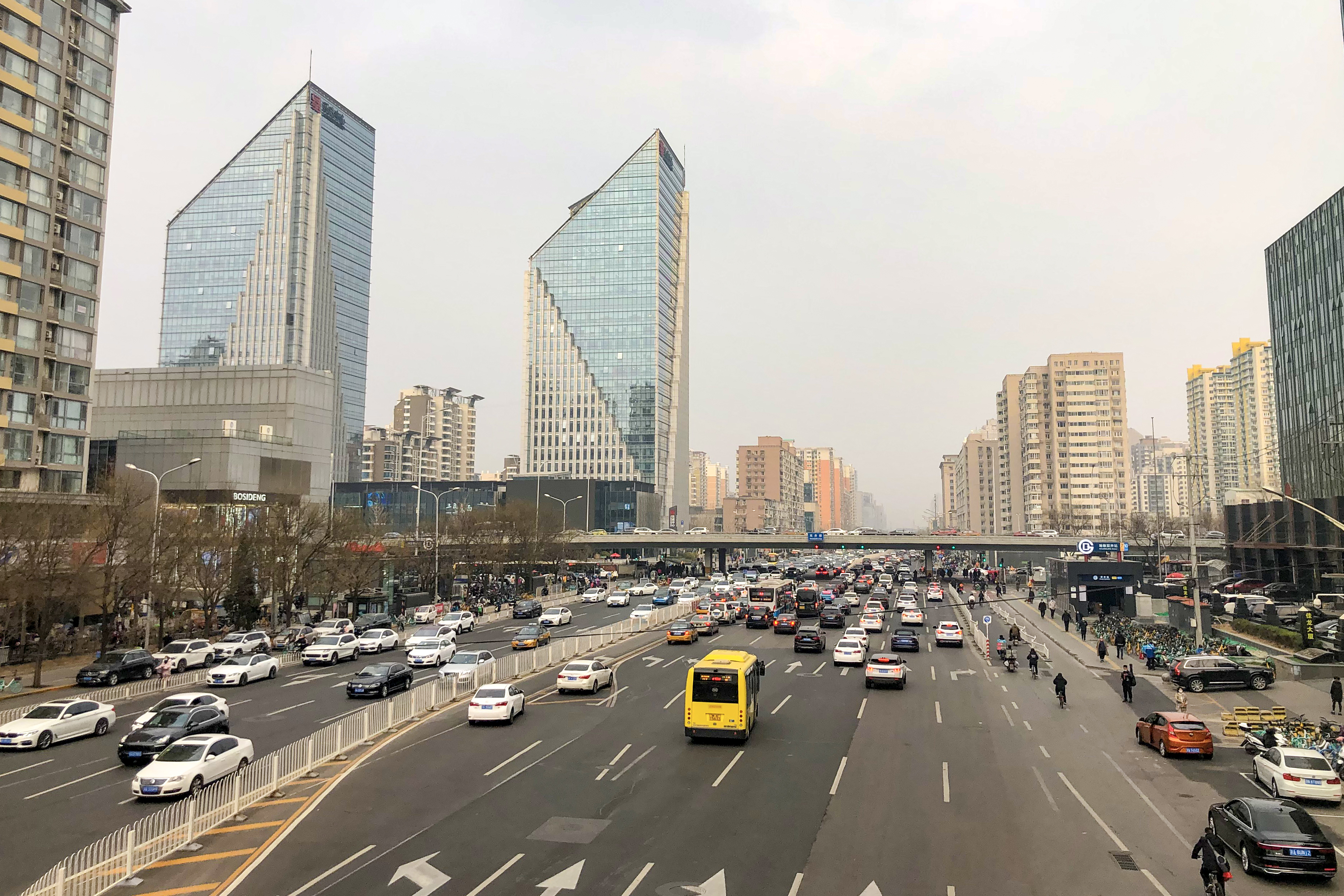
- Shuangjing Bridge, 2021

- Location within Beijing Location within China
- Coordinates: 39°53′49″N 116°28′00″E
- Country: China
- Municipality: Beijing
- District: Chaoyang
- Village-level divisions: 18 residential communities

Area
  - Total: 5.1 km^{2} (2.0 sq mi)
- Elevation: 44 m (144 ft)

Population (2020)
  - Total: 93,962
  - Density: 18,000/km^{2} (48,000/sq mi)
- Time zone: UTC+8 (China Standard)
- Postal code: 100022
- Area code: 010

Shuangjing Subdistrict (simplified Chinese: 双井街道; traditional Chinese: 雙井街道; pinyin: Shuāngjǐng Jiēdào; lit. 'double well') is a subdistrict of Chaoyang District, Beijing, located in the vicinity of Beijing East railway station and the Beijing CBD Its boundaries are the Tonghui River to the North, the East 4th Ring Road to the East, Jinsong High Street to the South, and the boundary between Chaoyang District and Dongcheng District to the West. As of 2020, it has a population of 93,962.

The subdistrict got its name due to the two wells, Tianshui and Kushui wells within the area during the reign of Daoguang Emperor.

== History ==
Timeline of changes in the status of Shuangjing Subdistrict
Year	Status
1949	Created as Guangqumen Borough Government
1959	Part of Gaobeidian Commune was incorporated
1981	Changed to Jingsong Subdistrict, 4 areas were incorporated: Jiasong, Panjiayao, Huchengcun and Shabanzhuang
1993	Baijianmu, Bainan, Baixi and Liangku communities were transferred to Nanmofang Township
1994	44 social work units were transferred to Nanmofang Township
1995	1 and a half communities and 12 social work units were transferred to Nanmofang Township

== Administrative Divisions ==
As of 2021, there are a total of 18 communities within the subdistrict:

Administrative Division Code	Community Name in English	Community Name in Chinese
110105016059	Chuiyangliu Dongli	垂杨柳东里
110105016060	Chuiyangliu Xili	垂杨柳西里
110105016061	Guangheli	广和里
110105016062	Shuanghuayuan	双花园
110105016063	Guangwainan	广外南
110105016064	Jiulong	九龙
110105016065	Dawan	大望
110105016066	Guangquan	广泉
110105016067	Fuli	富力
110105016068	Guanghuan	光环
110105016069	Jiulongnan	九龙南
110105016070	Baiziyuan	百子园
110105016071	Hepingcunyi	和平村一
110105016072	Dongbojie	东柏街
110105016073	Jiulongshan	九龙山
110105016074	Fulixi	富力西
110105016075	Huangmuchang	黄木厂
110105016076	Maoxing	茂兴

== See also ==
- List of township-level divisions of Beijing
- Shuangjing Subway Station (Line 10)
