= Jiaohuachang station =

Beijing Subway station

Jiaohua Chang 焦化厂
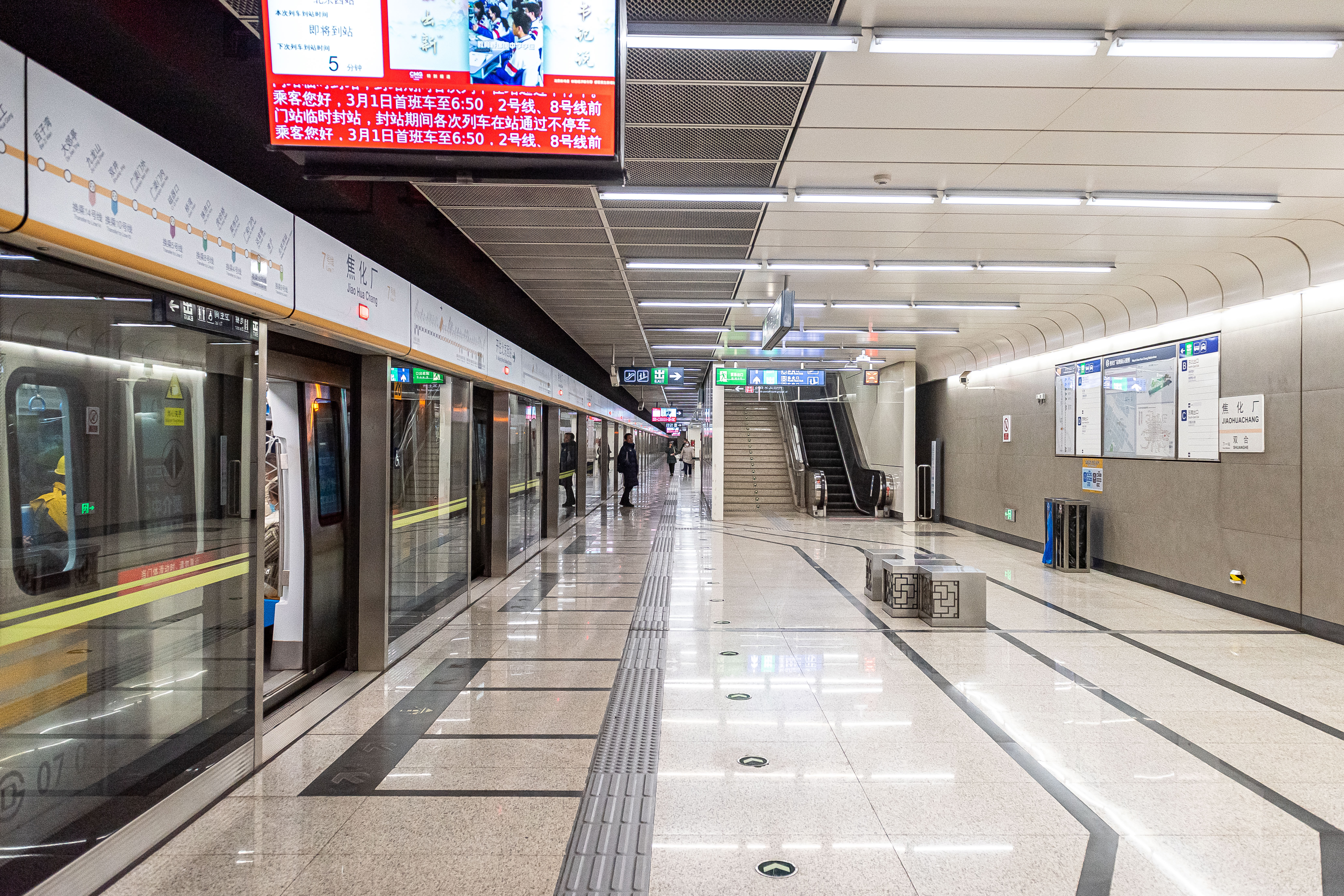
- Westbound platform

General information
- Location: Chaoyang District, Beijing; China
- Coordinates: 39°51′20″N 116°32′14″E
- Operator: Beijing Mass Transit Railway Operation Corporation Limited
- Line: Line 7
- Platforms: 2 (2 side platforms)
- Tracks: 2

Construction
- Structure type: Underground
- Accessible: Yes

History
- Opened: December 28, 2014; 11 years ago

Services
Preceding station	Beijing Subway	Following station
Shuanghe towards Beijing West railway station	Line 7	Huangchang towards Universal Resort
Location
- Location within Beijing

Jiaohua Chang Station (simplified Chinese: 焦化厂站; traditional Chinese: 焦化廠站; pinyin: Jiāohuà Chǎng Zhàn) is a station on Line 7 of the Beijing Subway. It was opened on December 28, 2014. It is located in the former site of the Beijing Jiaohuachang (Coking plant) complex. The station was the terminus of Line 7 until the opening of the phase 2 eastern extension to Huazhuang on December 28, 2019.

== Station layout ==
The station has 2 underground side platforms.

== Exits ==
There are 4 exits, lettered A, B, C, and D. Exits A and C are accessible.

== Gallery ==
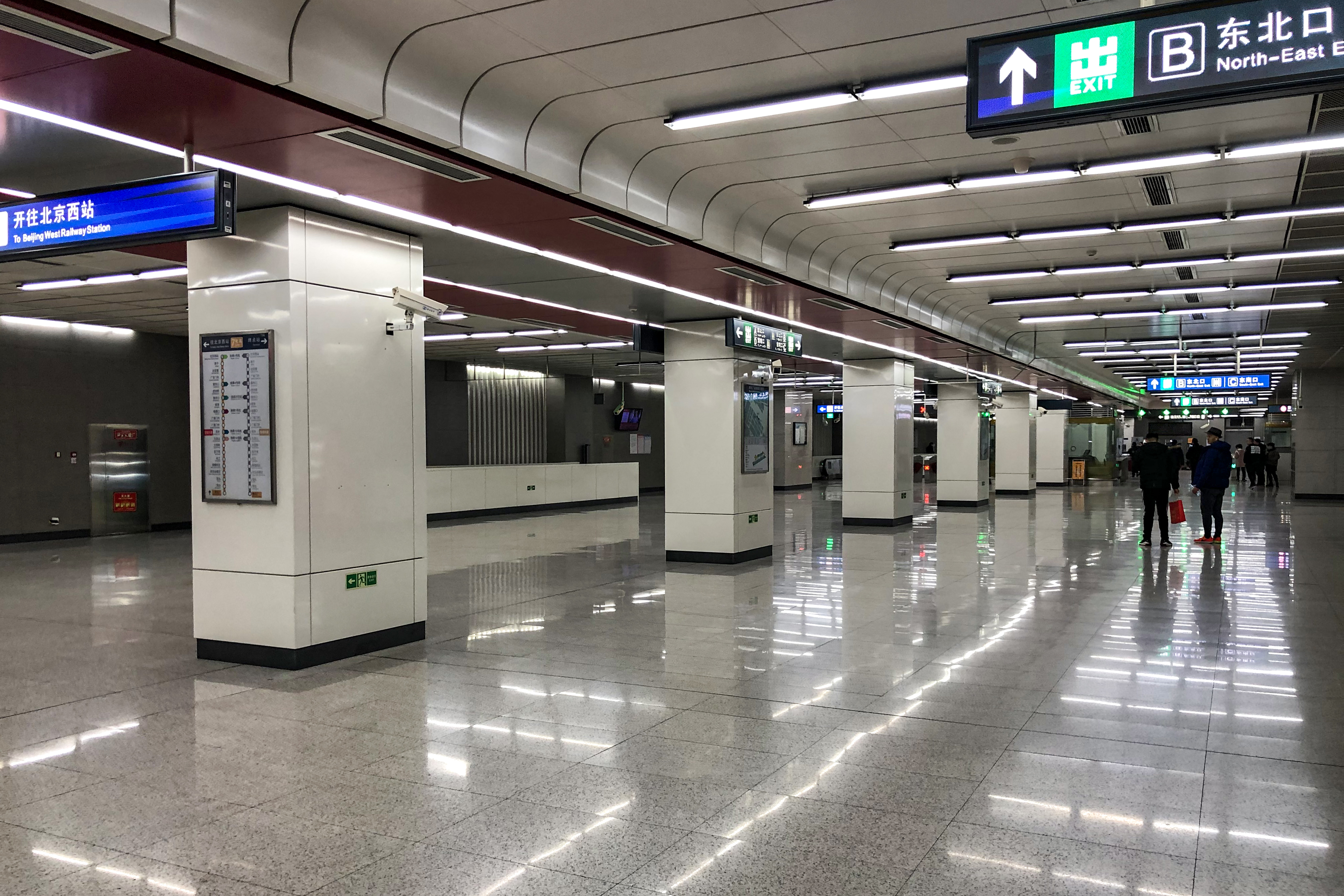
Concourse
