= Beijing Mass Transit Railway Operation Corporation Limited =

Chinese urban rail transit company

Beijing Mass Transit Railway Operation Corporation Limited 北京市地铁运营有限公司
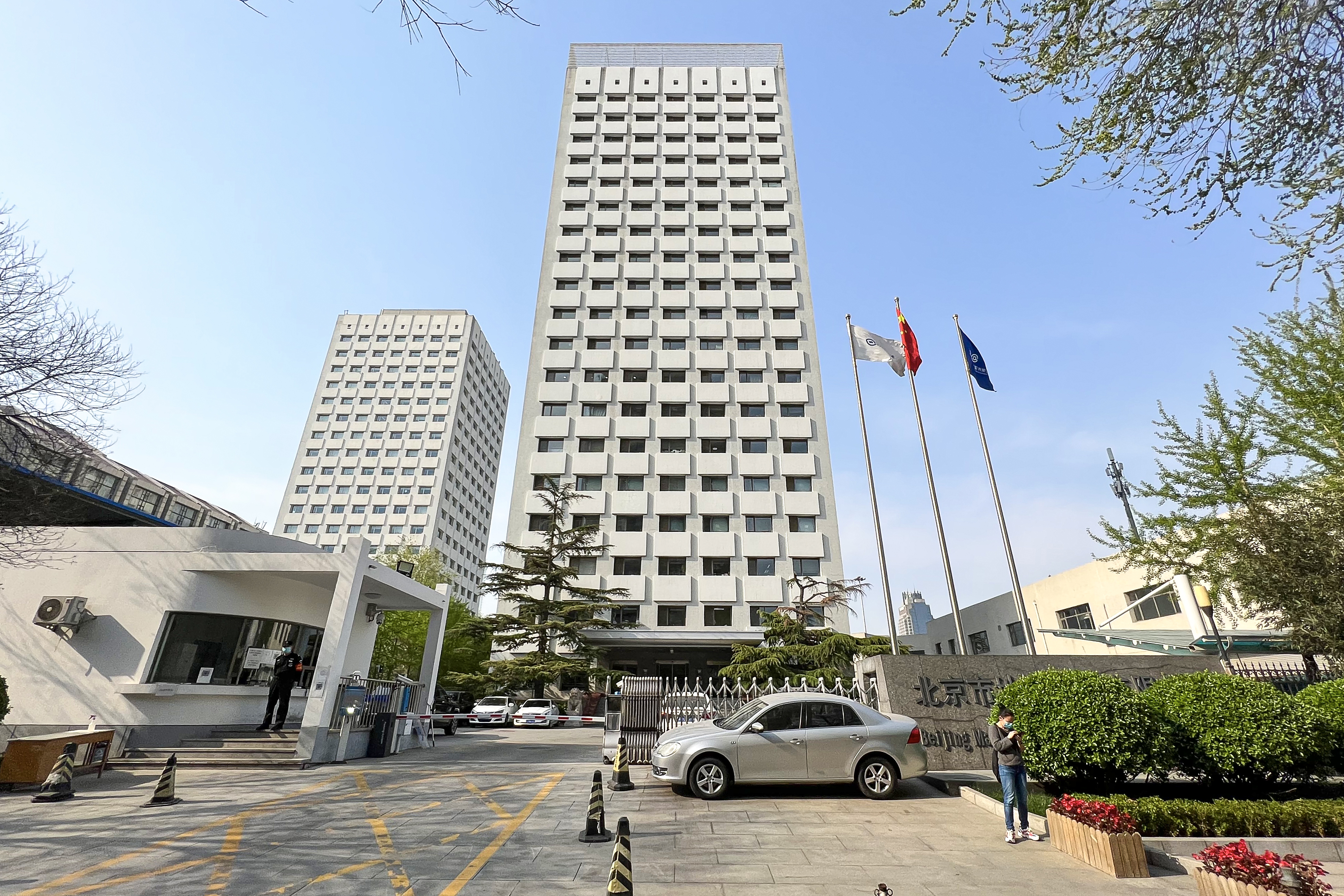
- Type: City-Owned Corporation
- Industry: Transportation
- Founded: Beijing, China (2001)
- Headquarters: Beijing, China
- Number of employees: 10,000
- Website: www.bjsubway.com/en/

Beijing Mass Transit Railway Operation Corporation Limited (北京市地铁运营有限公司) formerly known as the Beijing Municipal Subway Company (北京市地下铁道总公司), is the Beijing city-owned company that operates 15 lines of the Beijing Subway. Like many Chinese state-owned companies, it is managed by a chief executive and overseen by a board of directors / party committee. The company has about 10,000 employees. Its subsidiaries include the Beijing Subway Rolling Stock Equipment Co. Ltd.

== History ==
The company's origins dates to the construction of the Beijing Subway in the late 1960s. The subway construction and planning was headed by a special committee of the State Council. In February 1970, Premier Zhou Enlai handed management of the subway to the People's Liberation Army, which formed the PLA Rail Engineering Corp Beijing Subway Management Bureau. In November 1975, by order of the State Council and Central Military Commission the bureau was placed under the authority of Beijing Municipal Transportation Department.

On April 20, 1981, the bureau became the Beijing Subway Company, which was a subsidiary of the Beijing Public Transportation Company. The company's logo, the current symbol of the Beijing Subway, was unveiled in 1984, and the company was placed under the oversight of Beijing Planning Commission.

In July 2001, the Beijing Municipal Government reorganized the subway company into the Beijing Subway Group Company Ltd., a wholly city-owned holding company, which assumed ownership of all of the subway's assets. At the same time, the city also created two subsidiary companies—the Beijing Mass Transit Railway Operation Corp. Ltd., responsible for operating the subway, and the Beijing Mass Transit Construction Corp. Ltd., in charge of subway construction. This act separated ownership from operations of the subway and marked the beginning of the company as the designated subway operator. In November 2003, the assets of the Beijing Subway Group Company were transferred to the newly created Beijing Infrastructure Investment Co. Ltd. ("BII"). In 2004, BII signed a formal operations agreement with the company to manage Lines 1 and 2. This type of operations agreement was repeated for Lines Batong, 5, 8, 10, 13 and the Airport Express.

The company has management rights for 15 lines of the Beijing Subway: Lines 1, 2, 5–10, 13, 15, Batong line, Changping line, Fangshan line, Yizhuang line and S1 line.

== See also ==
- Beijing Subway
