= Wangsiying =

Wangsiying Township 王四营乡
- Township
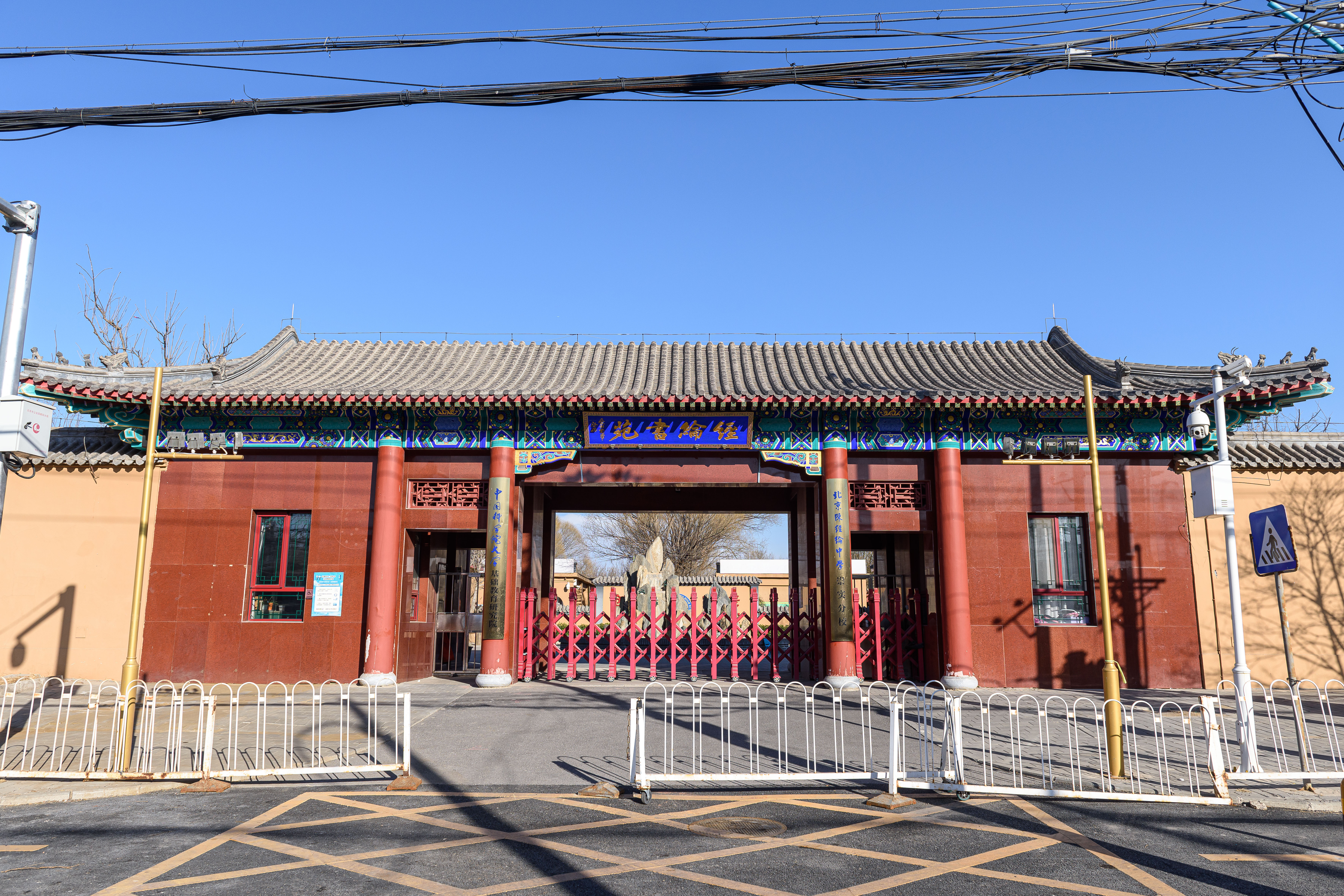
- Beijing Chen Jing Lun High School Chongshi Branch Shuyuan Campus within the township, 2024

- Location within Beijing Location within China
- Coordinates: 39°52′28″N 116°31′30″E
- Country: China
- Municipality: Beijing
- District: Chaoyang
- Village-level Divisions: 5 communities 6 villages

Area
  - Total: 15.35 km^{2} (5.93 sq mi)

Population (2020)
  - Total: 54,679
  - Density: 3,562/km^{2} (9,226/sq mi)
- Time zone: UTC+8 (China Standard)
- Postal code: 100123
- Area code: 010

Wangsiying Township (Chinese: 王四营乡; pinyin: Wángsìyíng Xiāng) is a township located on the southern part of Chaoyang District, Beijing, China. It borders Gaobeidian Township to the north, Dougezhuang to the east, Fatou Subdistrict and Shibalidian Township to the south, and Nanmofang Township to the west. In the year 2020, it has a total population of 127,268.

The area was named Wangsiying (Chinese: 王四营; lit. 'Wang Four Barrack') after the village where the township government is located. The village in turn was named so for its origin as a station for military personnel.

== History ==
Timeline of changes in the status of Wangsiying Township
Year	Status
1956	Formed as a township from merging of 3 villages: Guanyingtang, Mafangsi and Fatou
1958	Incorporated into Gaobeidian Township, later became a production team under People's Commune of Xingfu
1959	Part of People's Commune of Chaoyang
1961	Separated from Chaoyang and formed People's Commune of Wangsiying
1983	Reorganized into a township
2003	Became an area while retaining township status

== Administrative Divisions ==
In 2021, Wangsiying is composed of 11 subdivisions, with 5 residential communities and 6 villages. They are listed in the table below:

Administrative Division Code	Community Name in Simplified Chinese	Community Name in English	Type
110105042001	观音堂	Guanyingtang	Community
110105042002	白鹿	Bailu	Community
110105042013	官悦欣园	Guanyue Xinyuan	Community
110105042014	观音堂二	Guanyintang'er	Community
110105042015	海棠	Haitang	Community
110105042200	官庄大队	Guanzhuang Dadui	Village
110105042201	观音堂大队	Guanyingtang Dadui	Village
110105042202	王四营大队	Wangsitang Dadui	Village
110105042203	南花园大队	Nanhuayuan Dadui	Village
110105042204	道口大队	Daokou Dadui	Village
110105042205	孛罗营大队	Boluoying Dadui	Village

== See also ==
- List of township-level divisions of Beijing
