= Dongfeng, Chaoyang District, Beijing =

Dongfeng Township 东风乡
- Township
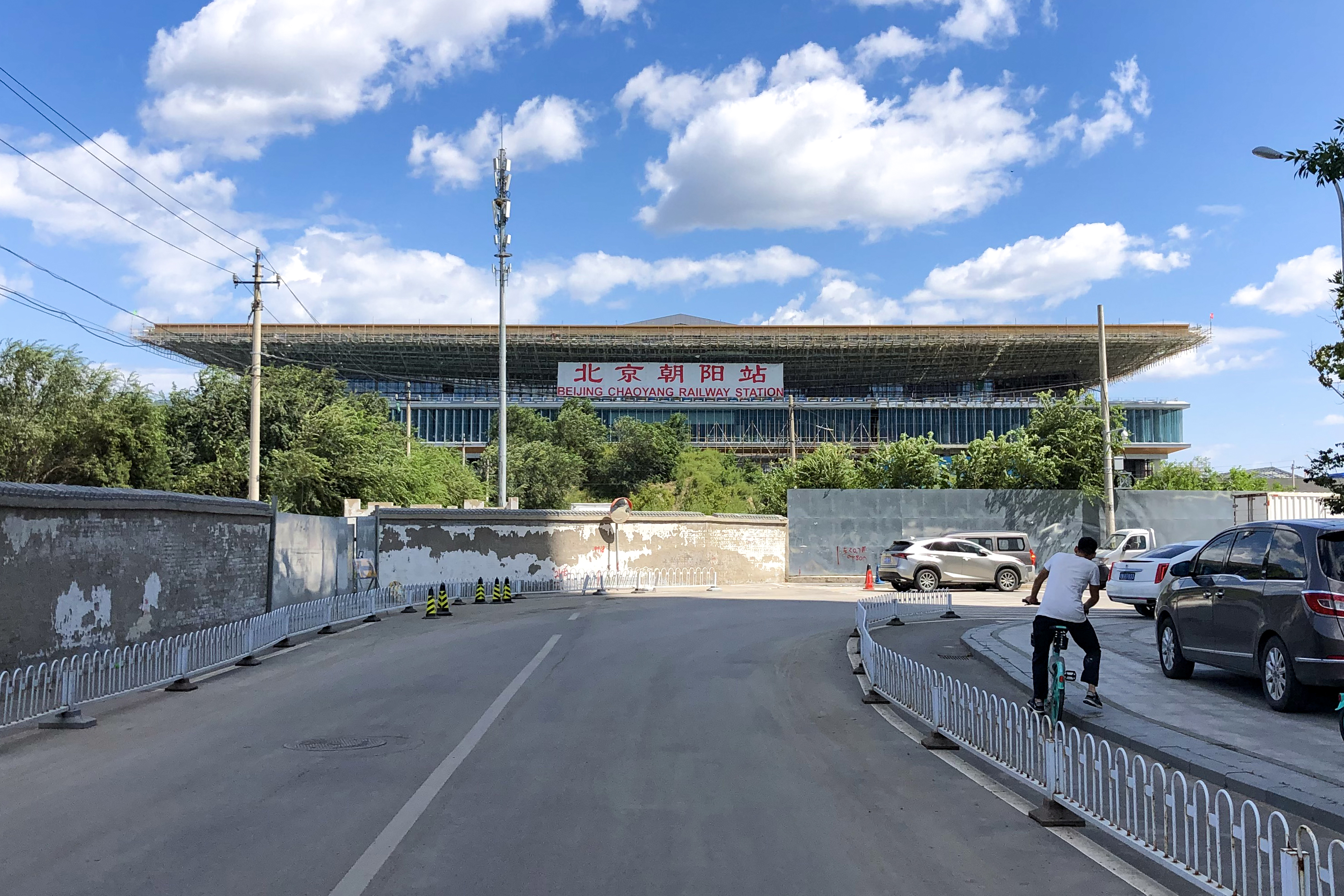
- Beijing Chaoyang Railway Station on the center of the township, 2020

- Location within Beijing Location within China
- Coordinates: 39°56′12″N 116°29′58″E
- Country: China
- Municipality: Beijing
- District: Chaoyang
- Village-level Divisions: 10 communities 4 villages

Area
  - Total: 7.38 km^{2} (2.85 sq mi)

Population (2020)
  - Total: 63,236
  - Density: 8,570/km^{2} (22,200/sq mi)
- Time zone: UTC+8 (China Standard)
- Postal code: 100025
- Area code: 010

Dongfeng Township (Chinese: 东风乡; pinyin: Dōngfēng Xiāng) is a township in center of Chaoyang District, Beijing, China. It borders Jiuxianqiao Subdistrict and Jiangtai Township to the north, Dongba and Pingfang Townships to the east, Liulitun Subdistrict to the south, Maizidian Subdistrict to the west. In the year 2020, its population is 63,236.

== History ==
Timeline of changes in the status of Dongfeng Township
Time	Status
Ming dynasty	Part of Daxing County, Shuntian Prefecture
1947	Part of the 1st Suburban District
1949	Part of Dongjiao District
1956	Combined with 10 other agricultural cooperatives into Xinghuo Agricultural Cooperative, later changed to Liulitun Township
1958	Changed to People's Commune of Sino-German Friendship
1961	Changed to People's Commune of Xinghuo
1978	Changed to Dongfeng Township
1998	Dongfeng Farm was separated from Dongfeng Township
2003	Becoming an area while retaining township status

== Administrative Divisions ==
In 2021, there are 14 subdivisions under Dongfeng Township, with 10 communities and 4 villages:

Administrative Division Code	Community Name in English	Community Name in Simplified Chinese	Type
110105030007	Shifoying Dongli	石佛营东里	Community
110105030009	Dongrun Fengjing	东润枫景	Community
110105030010	Shifoying Xili	石佛营西里	Community
110105030011	Shifoying Nanli	石佛营南里	Community
110105030013	Ziluoyuan	紫萝园	Community
110105030014	Gongyuan Dadao	公园大道	Community
110105030015	Fanhai Guojinan	泛海国际南	Community
110105030017	Guanhu Guoji	观湖国际	Community
110105030018	Nanshiliju	南十里居	Community
110105030019	Dongfengyuan	东风苑	Community
110105030200	Dougezhuang	豆各庄	Village
110105030201	Jiangtaiwa	将台洼	Village
110105030202	Xinzhuang	辛庄	Village
110105030203	Liulitun	六里屯	Village

== See also ==
- List of township-level divisions of Beijing
