= Aoyuncun Subdistrict =

Aoyuncun Subdistrict 奥运村街道
- Subdistrict
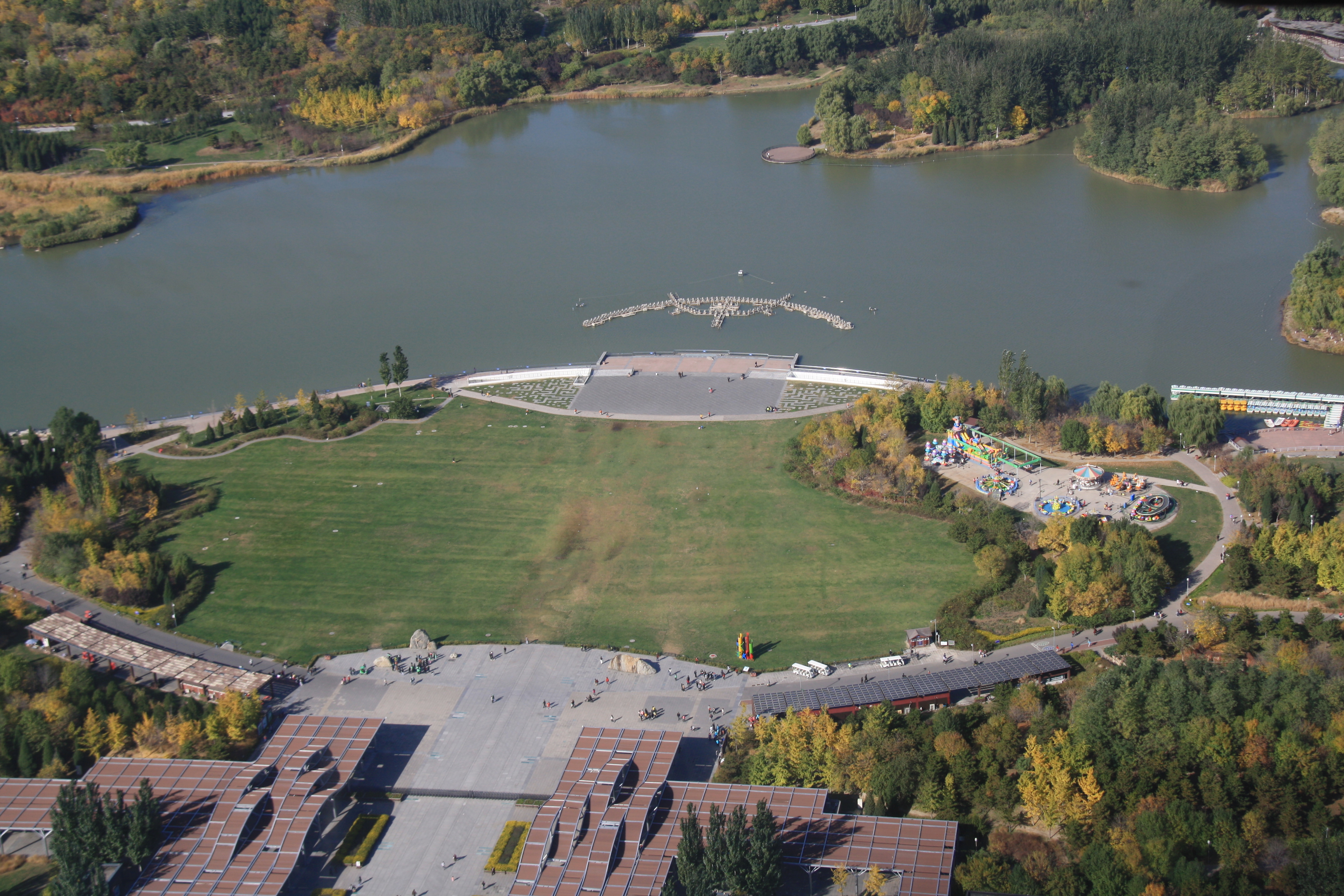
- Entrance of Olympic Forest Park within the subdistrict, 2015

- Location within Beijing Location within China
- Coordinates: 40°01′21″N 116°23′17″E
- Country: China
- Municipality: Beijing
- District: Chaoyang
- Village-level Divisions: 16 communities

Area
  - Total: 19.6 km^{2} (7.6 sq mi)

Population (2020)
  - Total: 109,688
  - Density: 5,600/km^{2} (14,500/sq mi)
- Time zone: UTC+8 (China Standard)
- Postal code: 100107
- Area code: 010

Aoyuncun Subdistrict (Chinese: 奥运村街道; pinyin: Àoyùncūn Jiēdào) is a subdistrict on the northwestern corner of Chaoyang District, Beijing, China. It borders Dongsheng Township and Dongxiaokou Town to the north, Laiguangying Township to the east, Yayuncun and Datun Subdistricts to the south, and Haidian District to the west. As of 2020, it has a total population of 109,688.

The subdistrict got the current name Aoyuncun (Chinese: 奥运村; lit. 'Olympic Games Village') due to the Beijing Olympic Village located within it.

== History ==
Timetable of changes in the status of Aoyuncun Subdistrict
| Year | Status |
|---|---|
| 1949 | Created as Wabian Township, part of 17th District |
| 1950 | Part of 14th District |
| 1952 | Part of East Suburban District |
| 1953 | Divided into Wali, Wabian and Guanxizhuang Small Townships |
| 1956 | The Small Townships were merged to form Wali Township, containing 9 Production teams underneath |
| 1958 | Reorganized as Wali Work Station, part of People's Commune of Heping |
| 1961 | Separated from People's Commune of Heping and established as People's Commune of Wali |
| 1983 | Restored as Wali Township |
| 2003 | Wali Area Bureau was created |
| 2004 | Renamed Aoyuncun Subdistrict Bureau |
| 2011 | Aoyuncun Subdistrict formally established |

== Administrative Division ==
At the end of 2021, there are 16 communities under Aoyuncun Subdistrict:

| Administrative Division Code | Community Name in English | Community Name in Simplified Chinese |
|---|---|---|
| 110105031005 | Dayangfang | 大羊坊 |
| 110105031006 | Shuangquan | 双泉 |
| 110105031012 | Zongzhuang | 总装 |
| 110105031013 | Kexueyuan | 科学园 |
| 110105031015 | Fenglin Lüzhou | 风林绿洲 |
| 110105031016 | Beishatan | 北沙滩 |
| 110105031017 | Lincui | 林萃 |
| 110105031018 | Lüse Jiayuan | 绿色家园 |
| 110105031019 | Nanshatan | 南沙滩 |
| 110105031020 | Wanke Xingyuan | 万科星园 |
| 110105031021 | Longxiang | 龙祥 |
| 110105031023 | Guo'aocun | 国奥村 |
| 110105031024 | Fulinyuan | 拂林园 |
| 110105031025 | Dayangfangnan | 大羊坊南 |
| 110105031026 | Lincui Xili | 林萃西里 |
| 110105031027 | Beishatanbei | 北沙滩北 |

== Landmarks ==
- Olympic Forest Park
- Beijing National Stadium
- Beijing National Aquatics Center
