= Deutsche Botschaftsschule Peking =

German international school in Beijing, China

- 北京德国使馆学校

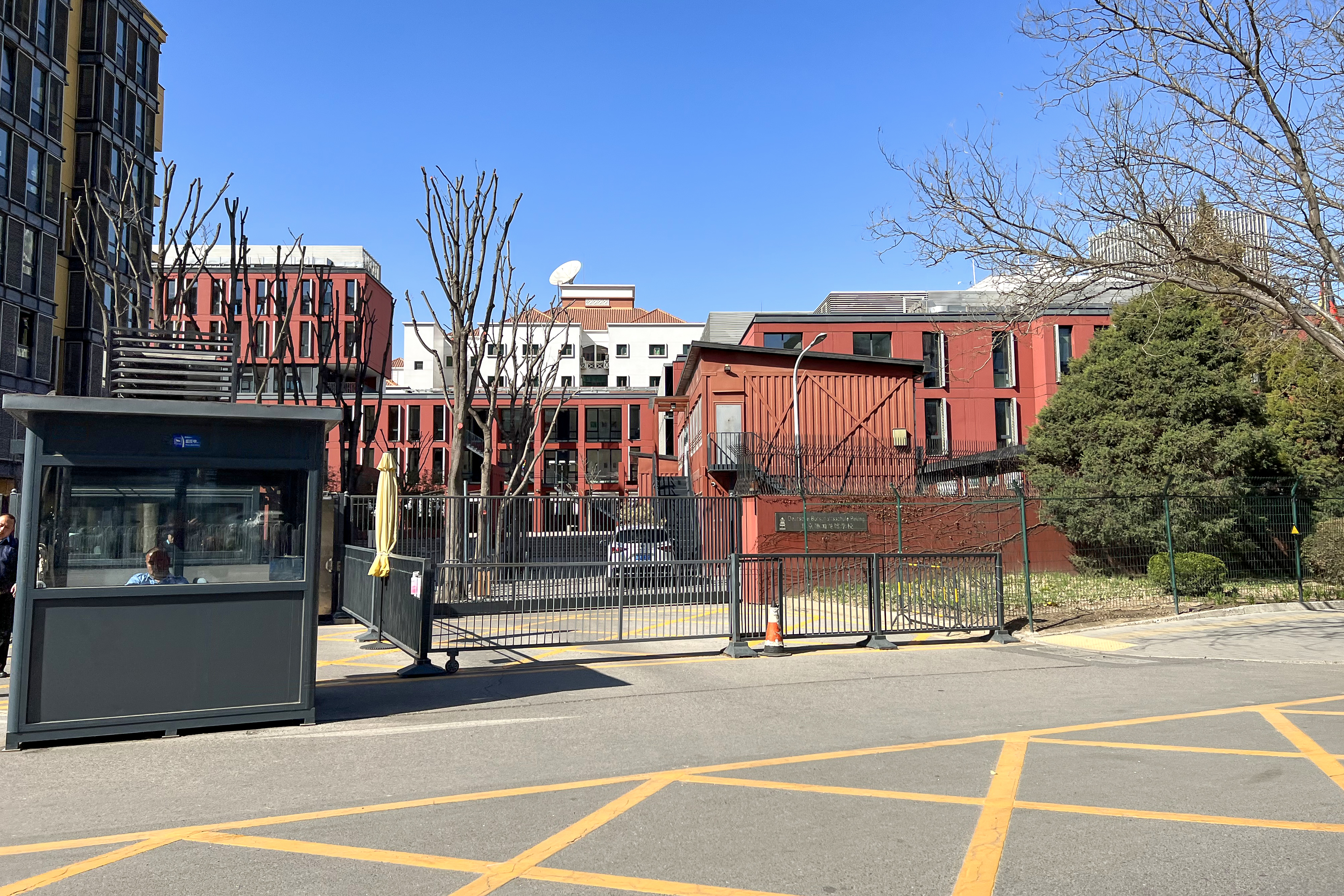

Location
- 49A Liangmaqiao Road, Chaoyang Dist. (Chaoyang Bezirk in German), 100125 Beijing; Chaoyang District, Beijing; China
- Coordinates: 39.95026°N 116.46093°E

Information
- Type: German international school
- Established: 2004
- Grades: 1-12
- Enrollment: 330

Deutsche Botschaftsschule Peking

Chinese name
- Simplified Chinese: 北京德国使馆学校
- Traditional Chinese: 北京德國使館學校
Transcriptions
Standard Mandarin
- Hanyu Pinyin: Běijīng Déguó Shǐguǎn Xuéxiào

German name
- German: Deutsche Botschaftsschule Peking

'Deutsche Botschaftsschule Peking (DBP; "German Embassy School of Beijing", Chinese: 北京德国使馆学校) is a German international school in Chaoyang District, Beijing. It serves years 1–12.

The current building, with a capacity of over 330 pupils, opened in 2004.

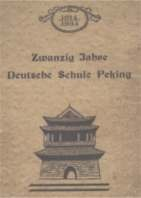
Logo from a 20th anniversary notice
