= Beijing–Tongzhou Expressway =

Road in Beijing, China

Coordinates: 39.9090°N 116.5513°E

Beijing-Tongzhou Expressway
- Jingtong Expressway; Chinese: 京通快速路
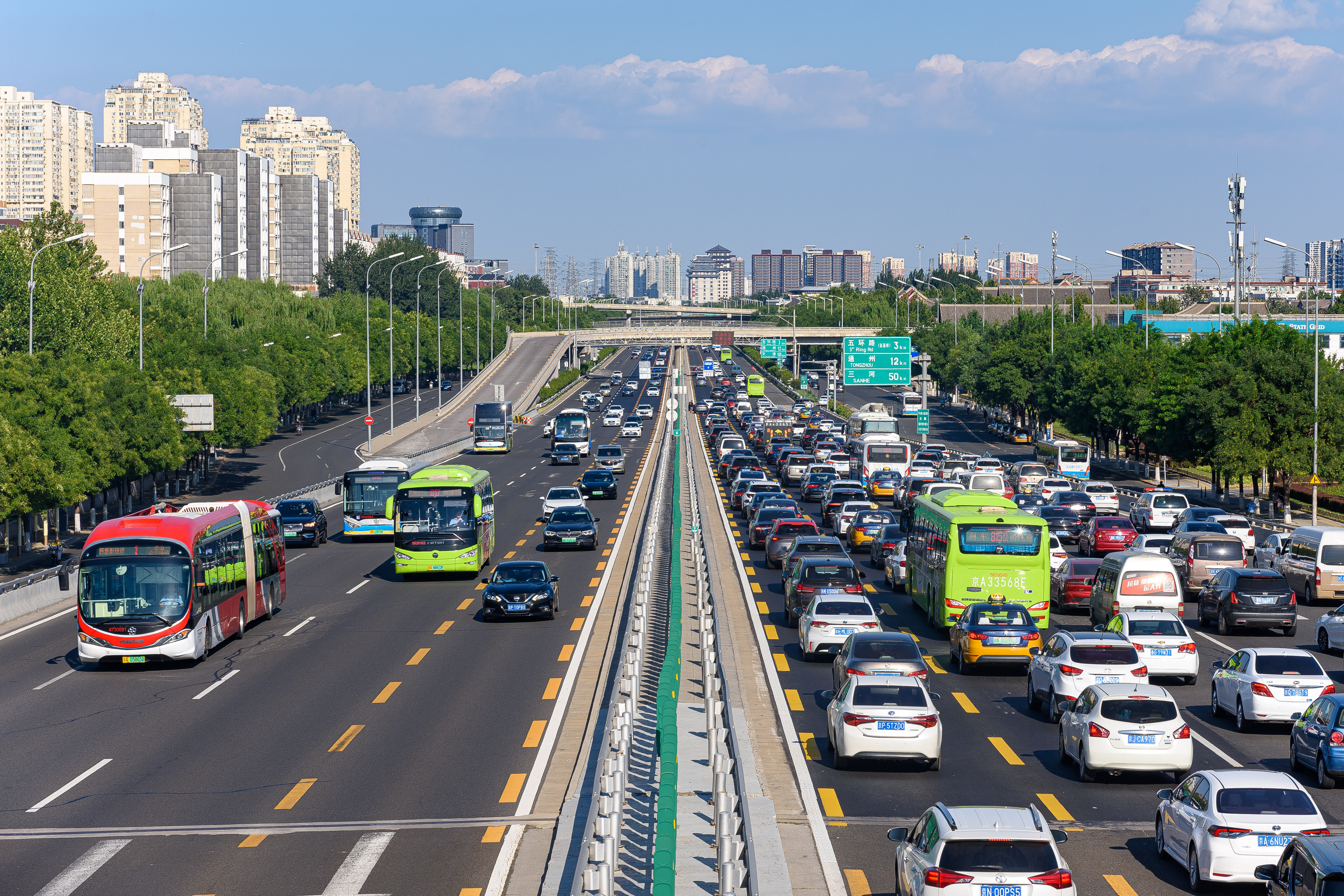

Route information
- Length: 18.6 km (11.6 mi)
- Existed: 1996–present

Location
- Country: China

Highway system
- Transport in China

The Jingtong Expressway (Chinese: 京通快速路; pinyin: Jīngtōng Kuàisù Lù) is an expressway with express road characteristics in Beijing which links the central Chaoyang District to Tongzhou District. At present, it is approximately 18.6 km (11.6 mi) in length.

For most of the expressway, the Batong line of Beijing Subway, an extension of Line 1, sits near the centre of the expressway, linking central Beijing to Tuqiao on the Eastern 6th Ring Road, beyond central Tongzhou.

Some universities sit right next to the expressway, including the Communication University of China.

== Route ==
The Jingtong Expressway runs entirely within the confines of the municipality of Beijing.

Basic Route: Beijing (Dawang Bridge - Sihui - Gaobeidian - Shuangqiao - Huicun - Tongzhou District)

== History ==
The Jingtong expressway was the first highway project built under Build-Operate-Transfer (BOT) scheme in China. The project was awarded to Lin Tung-Yen China with a 20-year concession period (1996–2016). The expressway was opened to the public in 1996.

In December 2004, a plan was unveiled to local media to interlink the 2.5 km of non-expressway between the Jingtong and Jingha expressways with an express road connection, eliminating traffic bottlenecks between Ximazhuang and Beiguan Roundabout. This link finally opened in December 2006, with the remaining bits and pieces of additional roadworks finishing in early 2007.

== Major Exits ==
Sihui, Gaobeidian, Shuangqiao, Huicun, Tongzhou District

== Connections ==
Ring Roads of Beijing: Connects with the E. 4th Ring Road at Sihui and the E. 5th Ring Road at Yuantong Bridge.

Jingha Expressway: Section heading for Shanhaiguan links with Jingha Expressway after the Tongzhou Beiguan Roundabout.

== Gallery ==
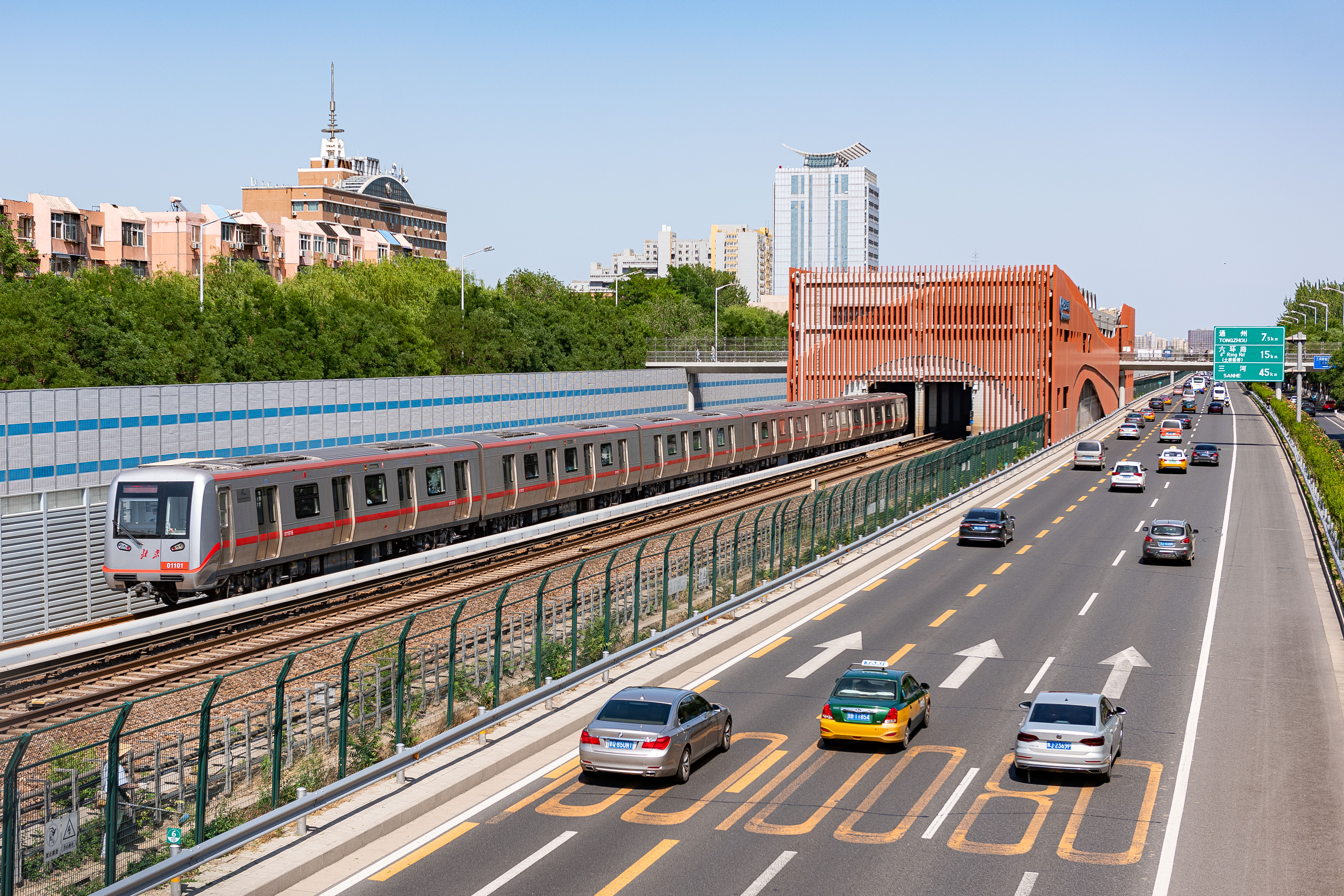
Jingtong Expressway and Batong line, Beijing Subway

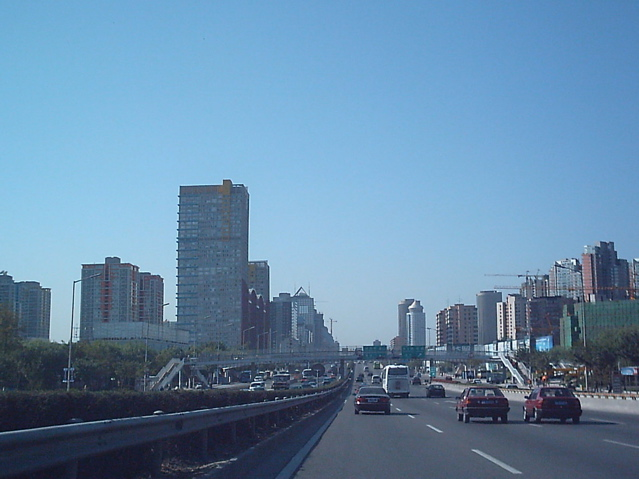
Jingtong Expressway near Dawangqiao and Dabeiyao

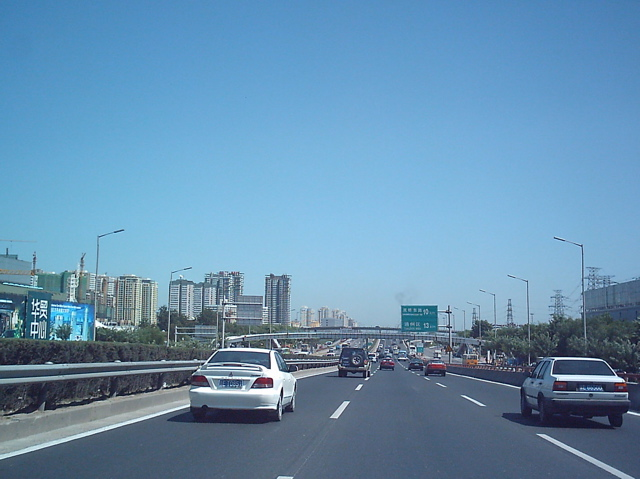
Start of Jingtong Expressway

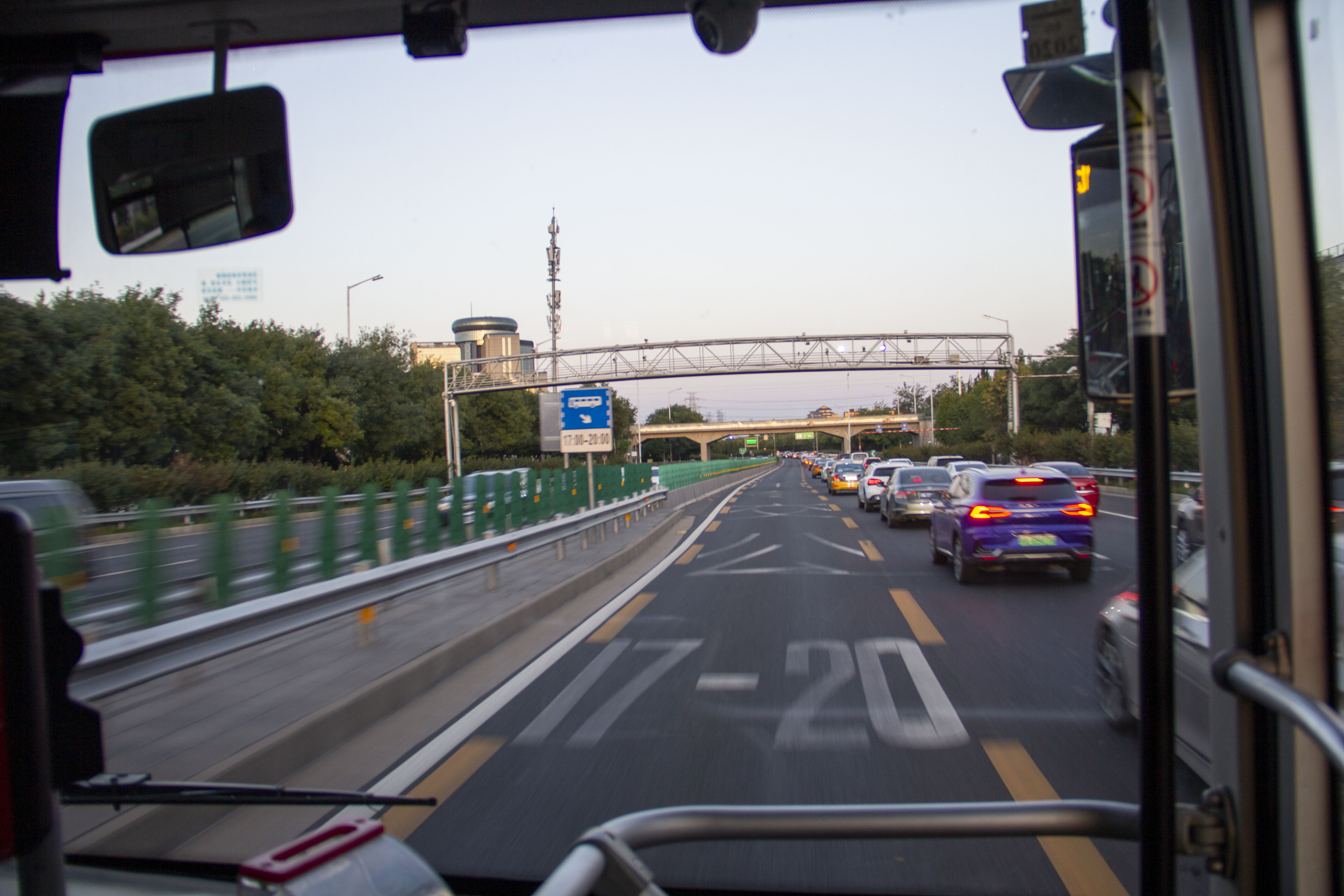
Bus lane along Jingtong Expressway
