= Nanmofang =

Nanmofang Township 南磨房乡
- Township
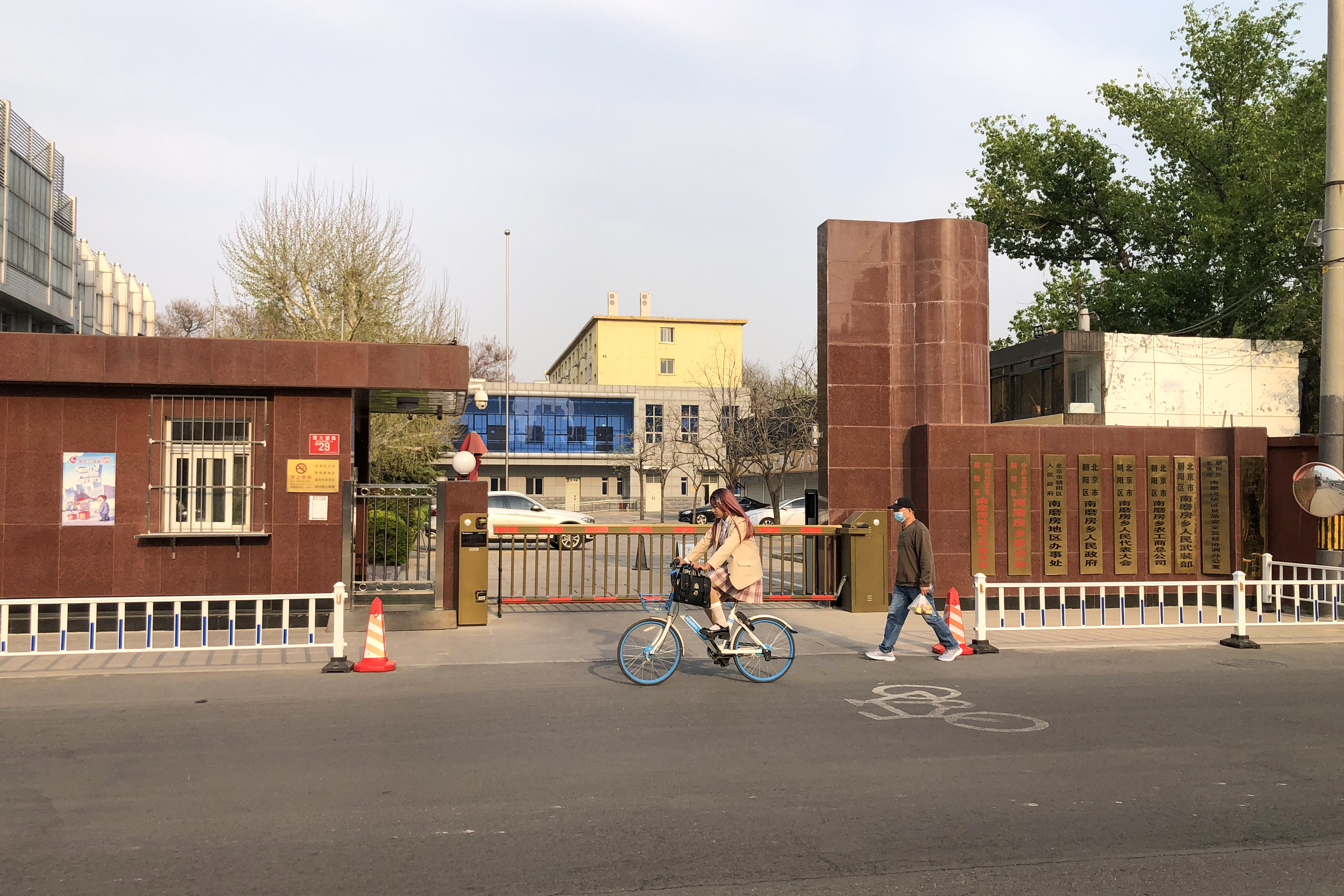
- Government building of Nanmofang Township/Area, 2021

- Location within Beijing Location within China
- Coordinates: 39°52′55″N 116°28′18″E
- Country: China
- Municipality: Beijing
- District: Chaoyang
- Village-level Divisions: 21 communities 2 villages

Area
  - Total: 9.43 km^{2} (3.64 sq mi)

Population (2020)
  - Total: 127,268
  - Density: 13,500/km^{2} (35,000/sq mi)
- Time zone: UTC+8 (China Standard)
- Postal code: 100124
- Area code: 010

Nanmofang Township (Chinese: 南磨房乡; pinyin: Nánmòfáng Xiāng) is a township on the southern part of Chaoyang District, Beijing, China. It borders Jianwai Subdistrict and Gaobeidian Township to the north, Fatou Subdistrict and Wangsiying Township to the east, Shibalidian Township to the south, Jinsong, Panjiayuan and Shuangjing Subdistricts to the west. In the year 2020, it has a total population of 127,268.

The current name of this area, Nanmofang (Chinese: 南磨房; lit. 'South Mill'), came from a mill house that used to exist within the region.

== History ==
Timeline of changes in the status of Nanmofang
Year	Status
1949	Part of 13th District
1952	Part of Dongjiao District
1956	Houfeng and Dajiaoting Townships were incorporated
1958	Part of People's Commune of Xingfu, Chaoyang District
1961	Separated from Xingfu and formed People's Commune of Nanmofang
1983	Reorganized into a township
1993	Becoming an area while retaining township status

== Administrative Divisions ==
In the year 2021, there were a total of 23 subdivisions under Nanmofang, in which 21 were communities and 2 were villages:

Administrative Division Code	Community Name in Simplified Chinese	Community Name in English	Type
110105021021	东郊	Dongjiao	Community
110105021022	百子湾西	Baiziwanxi	Community
110105021023	紫南家园	Zinan Jiayuan	Community
110105021024	平乐园	Pingle Yuan	Community
110105021025	欢乐谷	Huanlegu	Community
110105021026	双龙南里	Shuanglong Nanli	Community
110105021027	南新园	Nanxinyuan	Community
110105021028	百子湾东	Baiziwan Dong	Community
110105021029	山水文园	Shanshui Wenyuan	Community
110105021030	赛洛城	Sailuocheng	Community
110105021031	百子湾北	Baiziwanbei	Community
110105021032	广百西路	Guangbai Xilu	Community
110105021033	世纪东方城	Shiji Dongfangcheng	Community
110105021034	广华新城	Guanghua Xincheng	Community
110105021035	美景东方	Meijing Dongfang	Community
110105021036	石门	Shimen	Community
110105021037	双龙西	Shuanglongxi	Community
110105021038	华侨城	Huaqiaochneg	Community
110105021039	远景	Yuanjing	Community
110105021040	广华新城东	Guanghua Xinchengdong	Community
110105021041	南新园西	Nanxinyuanxi	Community
110105021200	楼梓庄	Louzizhuang	Village
110105021201	大郊亭	Dajiaoting	Village

== Landmark ==
- Happy Valley Beijing

== See also ==
- List of township-level divisions of Beijing
