= Chaoyang, Beijing =

District in Beijing, China

Coordinates: 39°55′32″N 116°26′30″E

Chaoyang 朝阳区
- District
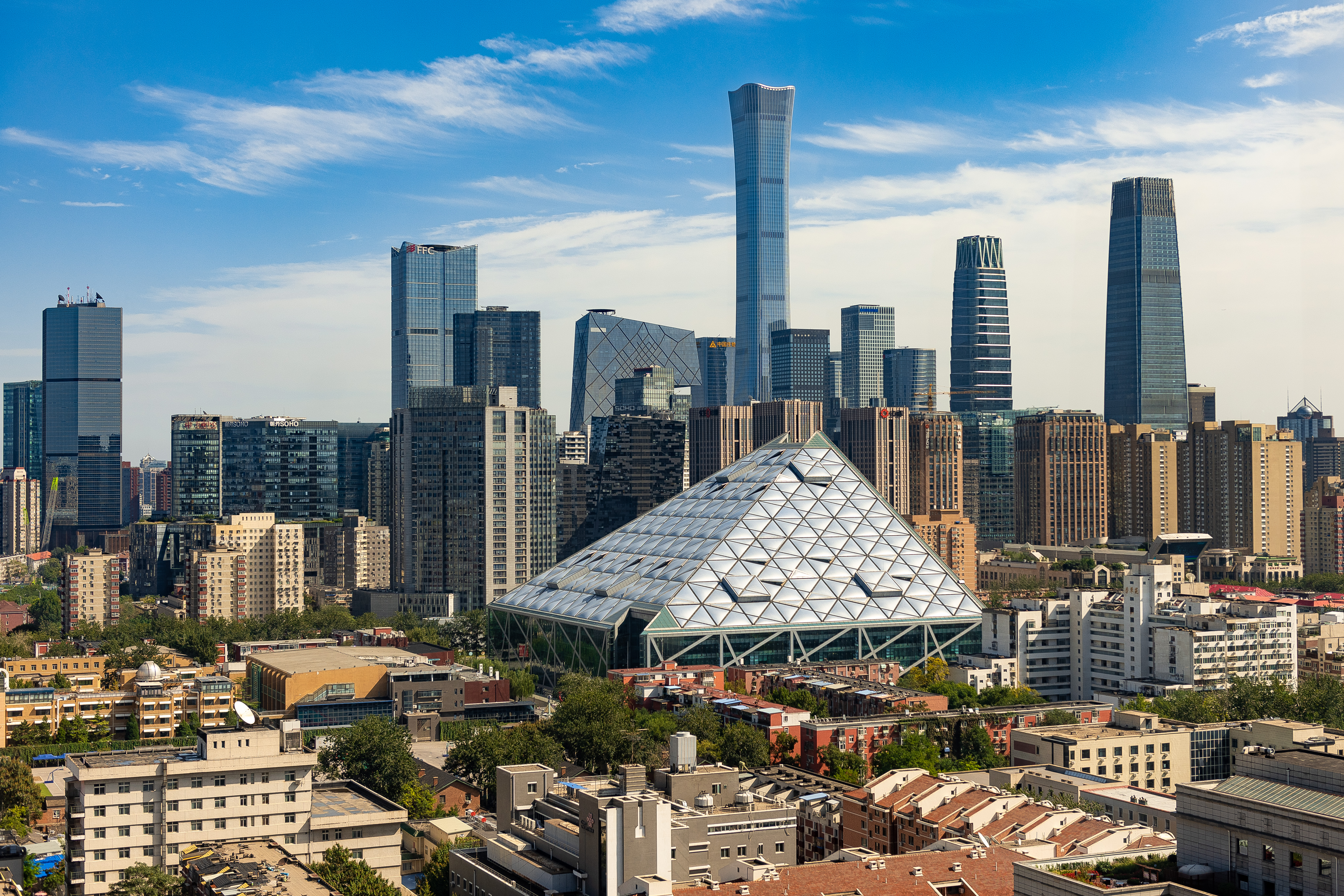
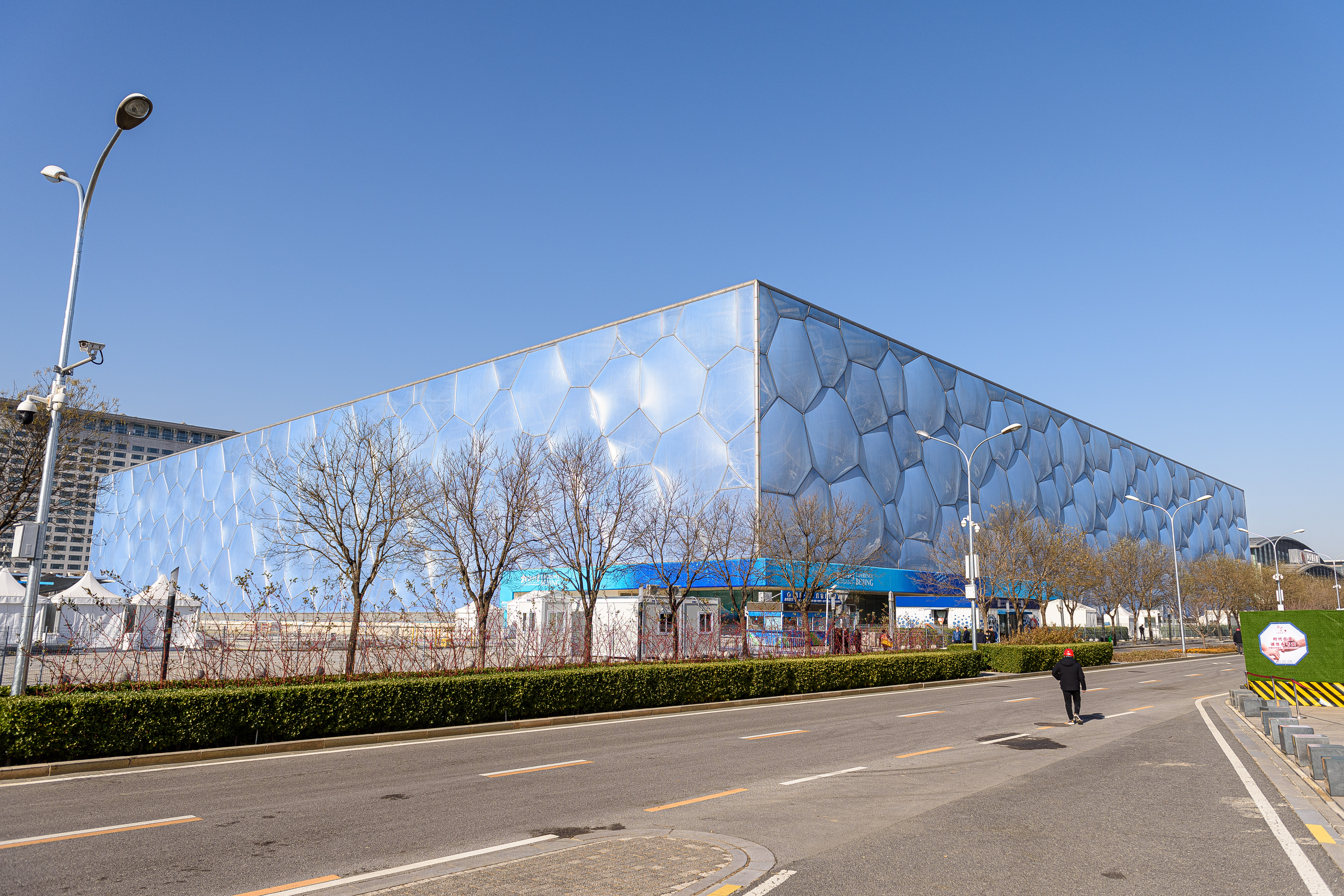
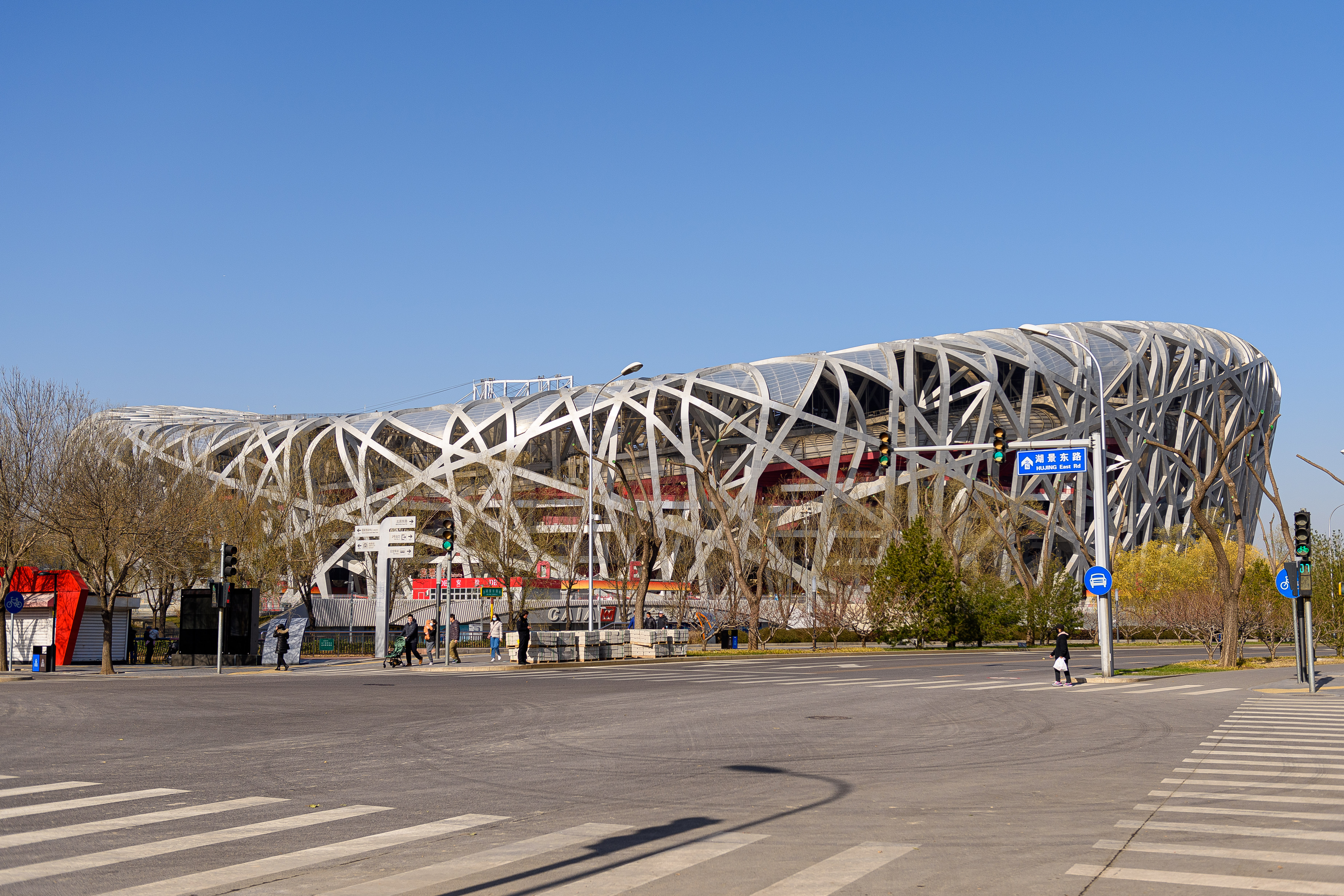
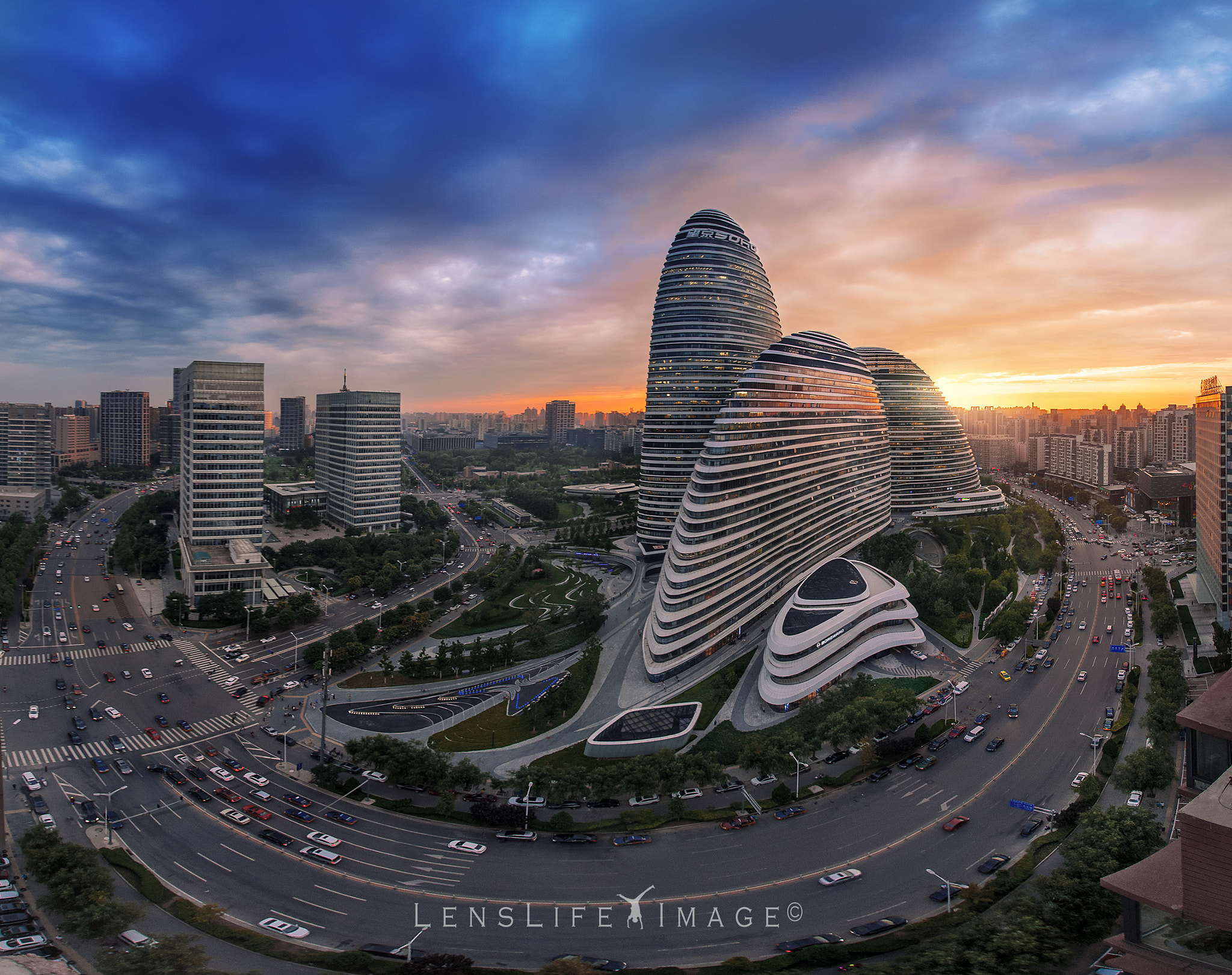
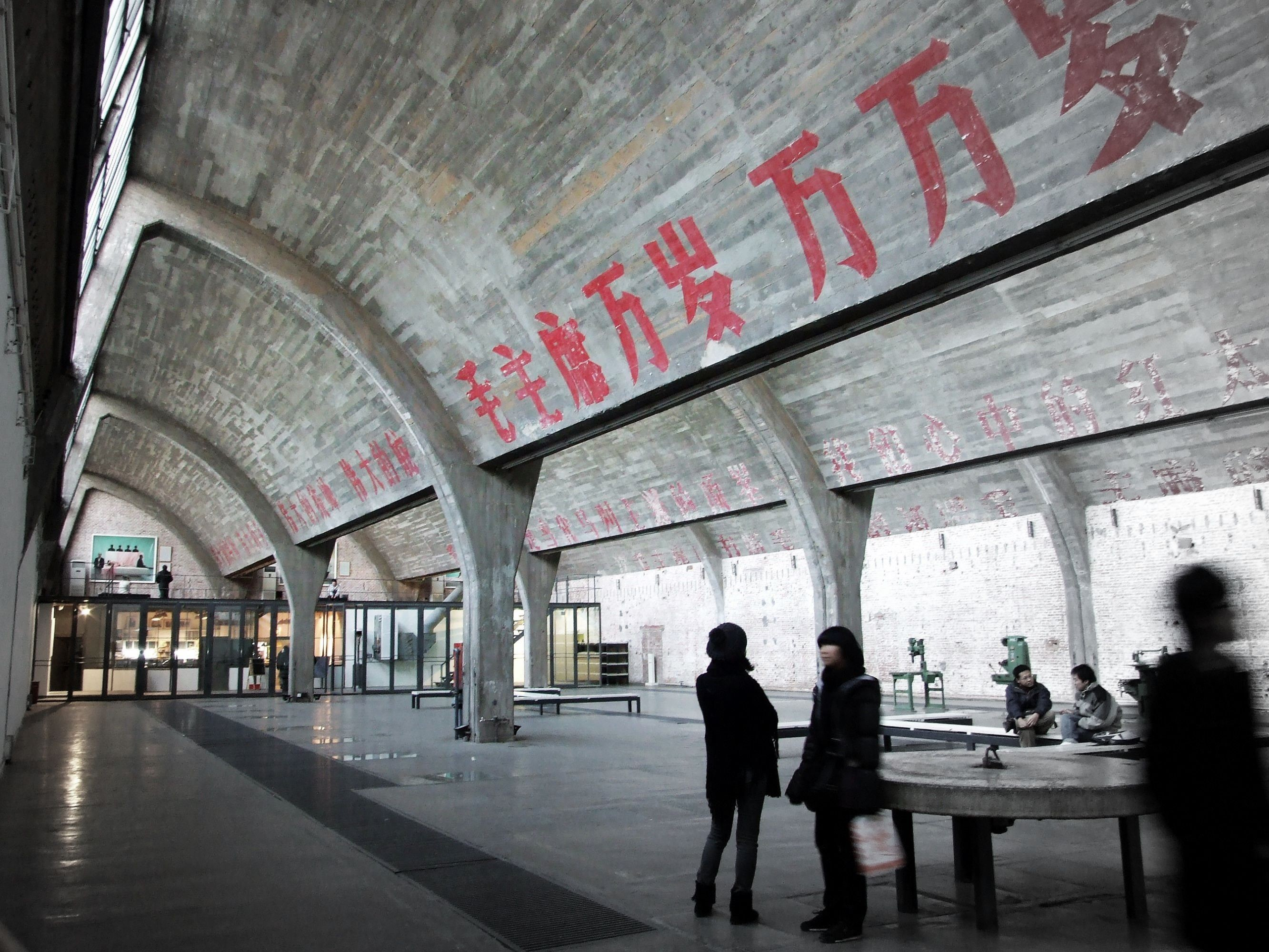
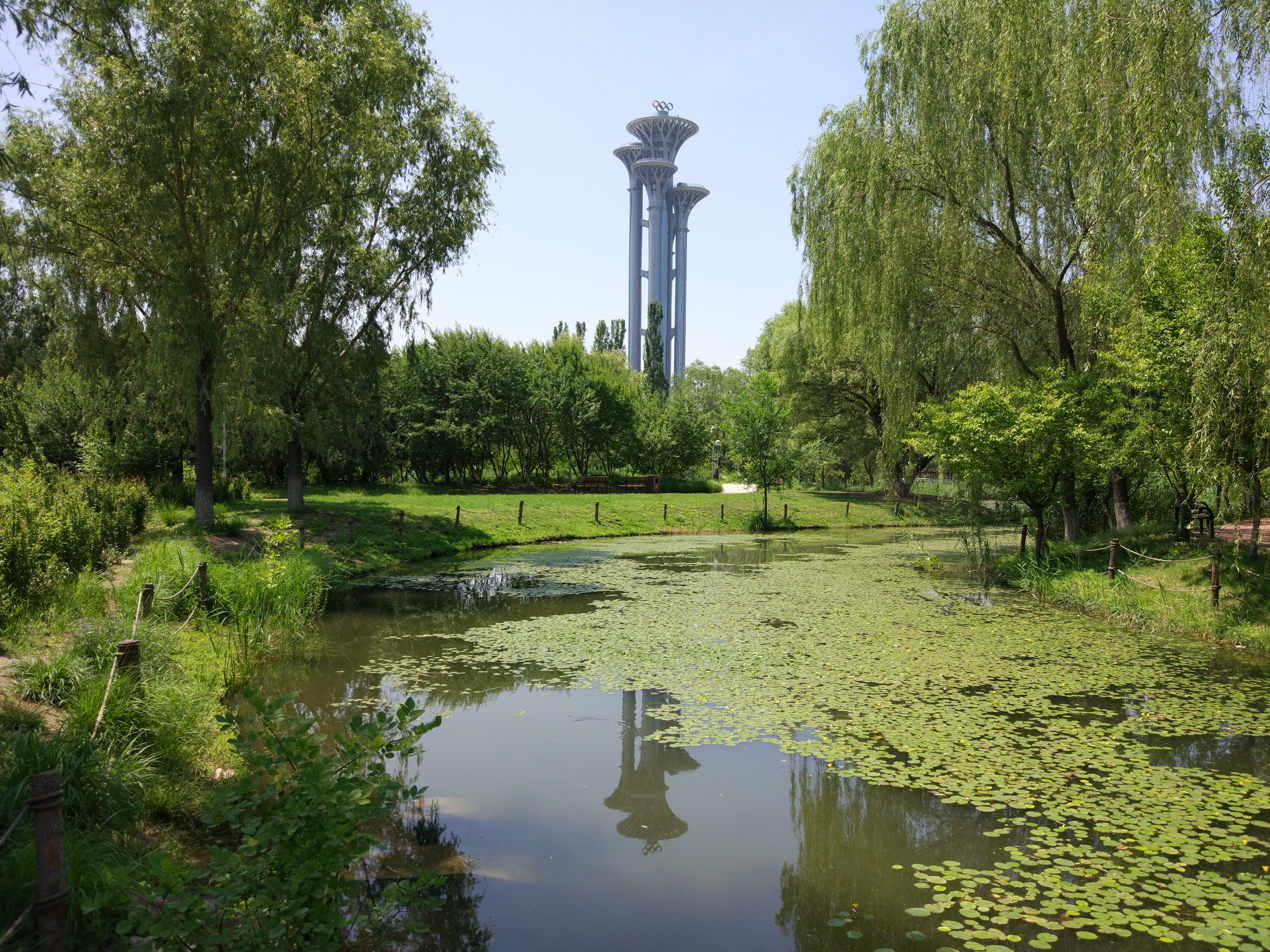
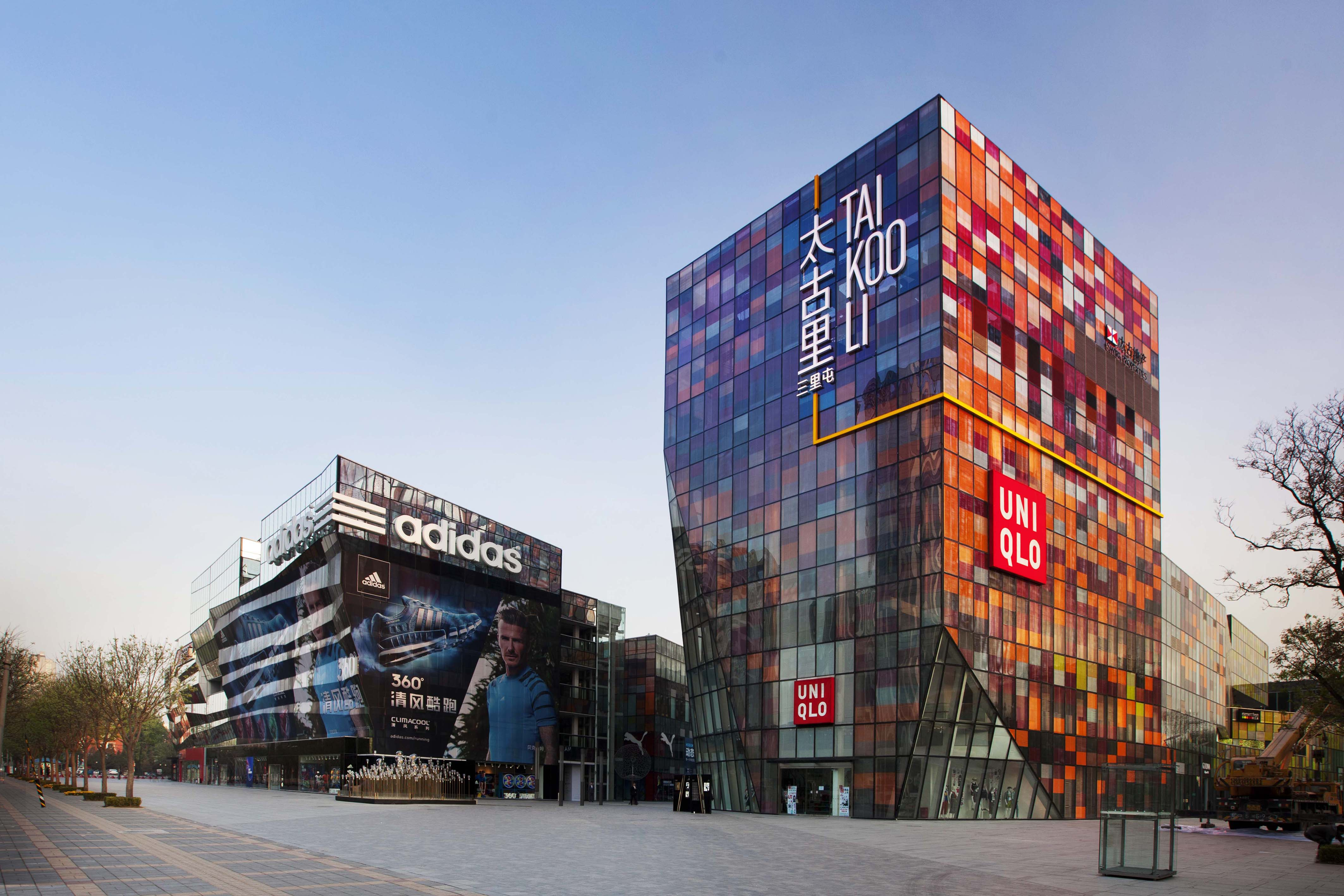
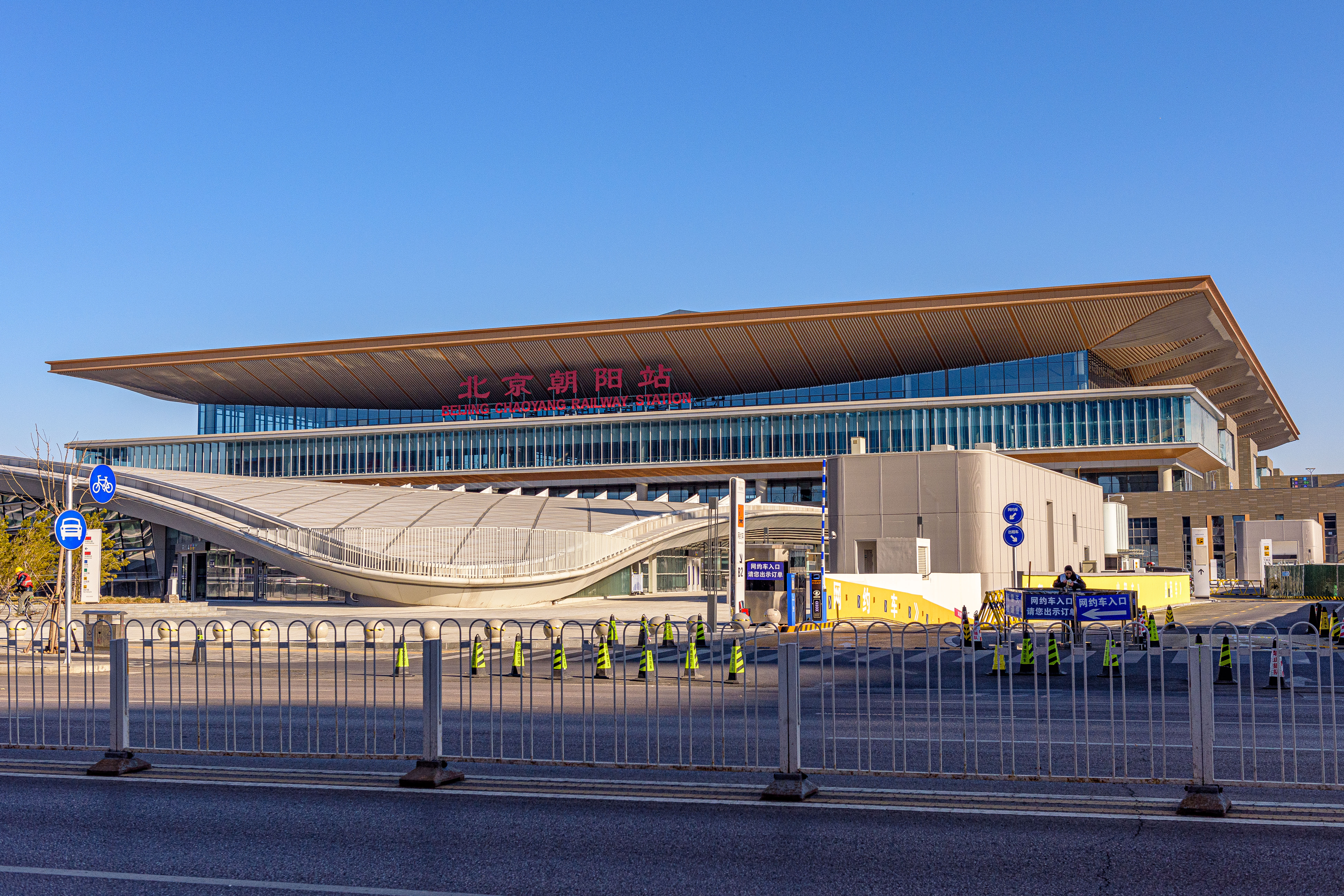
- Beijing CBD National Aquatics Center National Stadium Wangjing SOHO 798 Art Zone Olympic Forest Park Taikoo Li Sanlitun Beijing Chaoyang railway station
- Interactive map of Chaoyang
- Country: People's Republic of China
- Municipality: Beijing
- Township-level divisions: 43 subdistricts
- District seat: Jianwai Subdistrict (建外街道)

Area
  - Total: 470.8 km^{2} (181.8 sq mi)
- Elevation: 34 m (112 ft)

Population (2020)
  - Total: 3,452,460
  - Density: 7,333/km^{2} (18,990/sq mi)
- Time zone: UTC+8 (China Standard)
- Postal code: 10002X
- Website: www.bjchy.gov.cn

Chaoyang (Chinese: 朝阳区; pinyin: Cháoyáng Qū) is a municipal district of Beijing. It borders the districts of Shunyi to the northeast, Tongzhou to the east and southeast, Daxing to the south, Fengtai to the southwest, Dongcheng, Xicheng, and Haidian to the west, and Changping to the northwest.

Chaoyang is home to the majority of Beijing's many foreign embassies, the well-known Sanlitun bar street, as well as Beijing's growing central business district. The Olympic Green, built for the 2008 Summer Olympics, is also in Chaoyang. Chaoyang extends west to Chaoyangmen on the eastern 2nd Ring Road, and nearly as far east as the Ximazhuang toll station on the Jingtong Expressway. Within the urban area of Beijing, it occupies 470.8 km^{2} (181.8 sq mi), making it the central city's largest district, with Haidian second. As of the end of 2025, Chaoyang had a total population of 3.42 million, making it the most populous district in Beijing. The district has jurisdiction over 24 subdistrict offices and 19 area offices. Chaoyang is also home to Silk Street, Bainaohui Computer Shopping Mall, Alien Street (老番街市场), and many other market areas, shopping malls and restaurants.

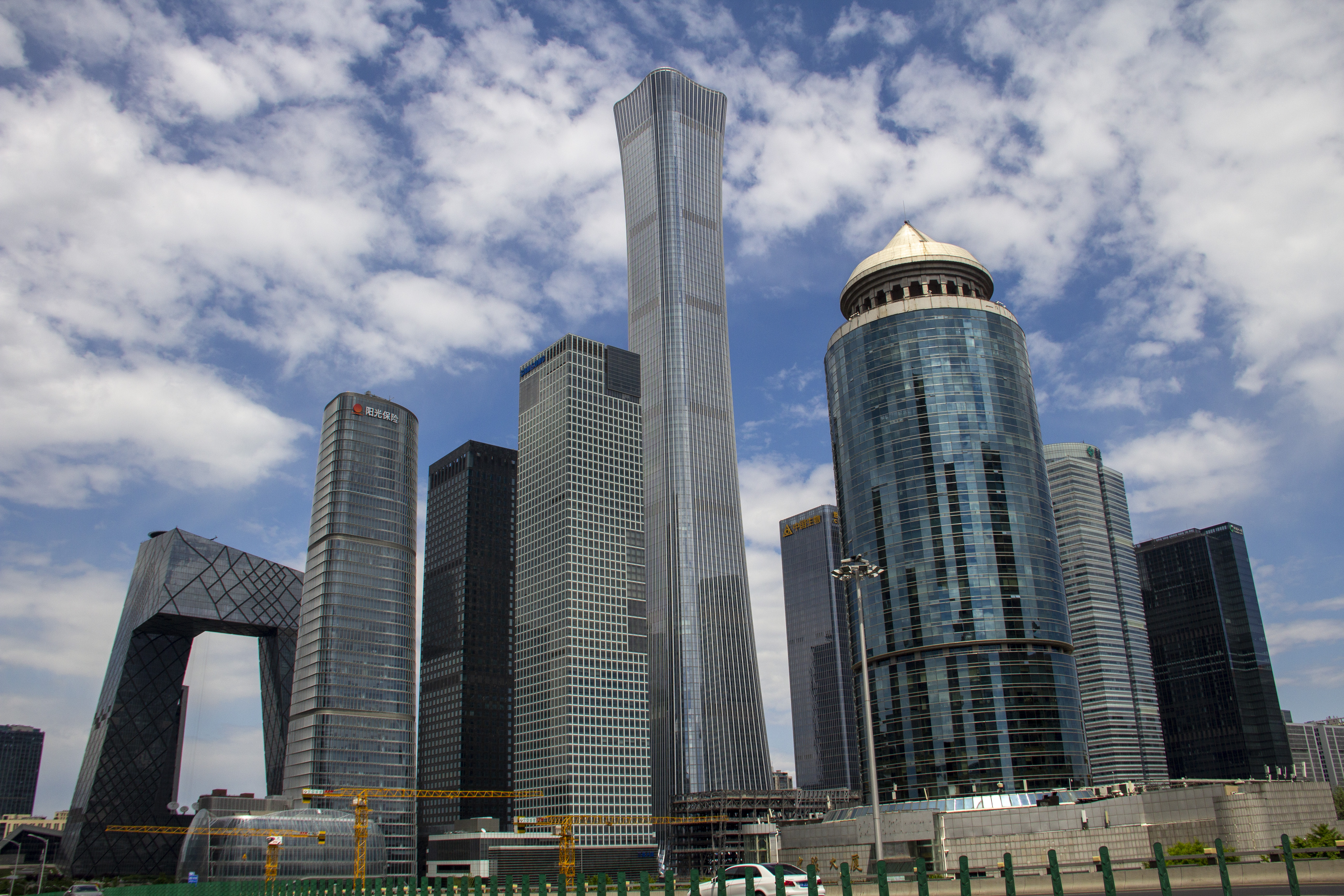
Beijing CBD in May 2022

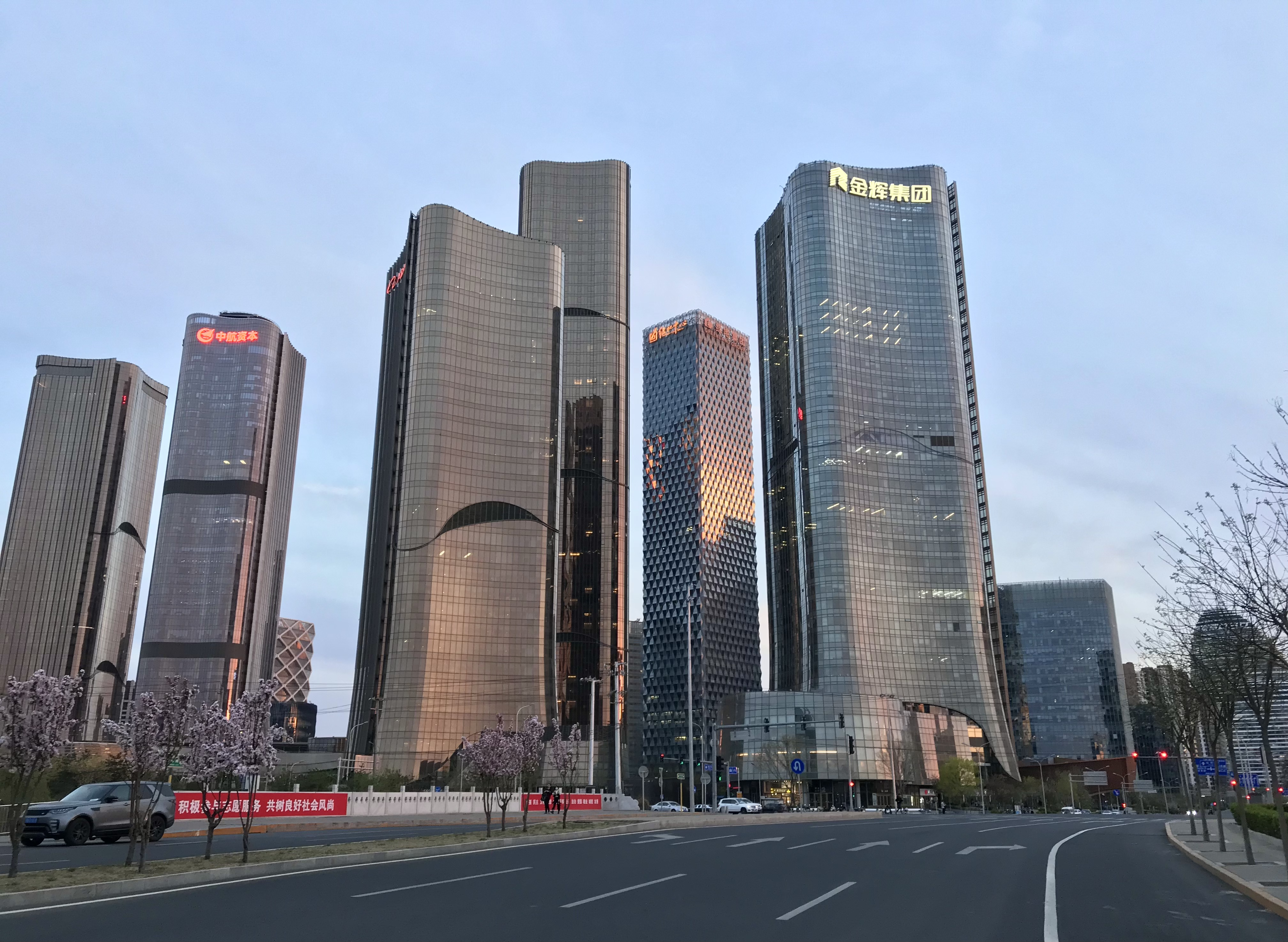
Dawangjing Business District in Donghu Subdistrict, April 2021

== Climate ==
Chaoyang District has a humid continental climate (Köppen climate classification Dwa). The average annual temperature in Chaoyang is 12.9 °C (55.2 °F). The average annual rainfall is 582.0 mm (22.91 in) with July as the wettest month. The temperatures are highest on average in July, at around 26.8 °C (80.2 °F), and lowest in January, at around −3.0 °C (26.6 °F).

Climate data for Chaoyang District, elevation 35 m (115 ft), (1991–2020 normals, extremes 1961–present)
Month	Jan	Feb	Mar	Apr	May	Jun	Jul	Aug	Sep	Oct	Nov	Dec	Year
Record high °C (°F)	14.7 (58.5)	25.7 (78.3)	29.2 (84.6)	34.5 (94.1)	41.1 (106.0)	41.6 (106.9)	41.0 (105.8)	37.7 (99.9)	36.4 (97.5)	30.8 (87.4)	22.5 (72.5)	18.7 (65.7)	41.6 (106.9)
Mean daily maximum °C (°F)	2.3 (36.1)	6.2 (43.2)	13.2 (55.8)	21.1 (70.0)	27.2 (81.0)	30.7 (87.3)	31.7 (89.1)	30.7 (87.3)	26.4 (79.5)	19.3 (66.7)	10.3 (50.5)	3.7 (38.7)	18.6 (65.4)
Daily mean °C (°F)	−3.0 (26.6)	0.3 (32.5)	7.3 (45.1)	15.0 (59.0)	21.1 (70.0)	24.9 (76.8)	26.8 (80.2)	25.7 (78.3)	20.6 (69.1)	13.2 (55.8)	4.7 (40.5)	−1.3 (29.7)	12.9 (55.3)
Mean daily minimum °C (°F)	−7.5 (18.5)	−4.8 (23.4)	1.2 (34.2)	8.3 (46.9)	14.3 (57.7)	19.2 (66.6)	22.4 (72.3)	21.3 (70.3)	15.5 (59.9)	7.7 (45.9)	−0.2 (31.6)	−5.6 (21.9)	7.7 (45.8)
Record low °C (°F)	−19.4 (−2.9)	−21.2 (−6.2)	−13.9 (7.0)	−3.8 (25.2)	2.7 (36.9)	9.3 (48.7)	14.2 (57.6)	13.3 (55.9)	4.3 (39.7)	−4.9 (23.2)	−13.2 (8.2)	−17.8 (0.0)	−21.2 (−6.2)
Average precipitation mm (inches)	2.3 (0.09)	5.3 (0.21)	8.1 (0.32)	22.1 (0.87)	36.4 (1.43)	80.8 (3.18)	183.9 (7.24)	138.6 (5.46)	59.5 (2.34)	29.3 (1.15)	13.8 (0.54)	1.9 (0.07)	582.0 (22.91)
Average precipitation days (≥ 0.1 mm)	1.5	2.3	2.8	4.7	5.9	10.1	12.8	10.5	7.3	4.9	2.9	1.7	67.4
Average snowy days	2.7	2.3	1.1	0.2	0	0	0	0	0	0	1.7	2.6	10.6
Average relative humidity (%)	43	42	41	43	49	60	72	73	68	63	57	47	55
Mean monthly sunshine hours	179.1	179.8	222.4	237.6	263.5	219.7	181.5	193.6	201.1	193.3	159.0	164.6	2,395.2
Percentage possible sunshine	60	59	60	59	59	49	40	46	54	57	54	57	55
Source: China Meteorological Administration

== Administrative divisions ==
Chaoyang is divided into 24 subdistricts, 18 townships and one ethnic township.

Name	Chinese (S)	Hanyu Pinyin	Population (2020)	Area (km^{2})
Jianwai Subdistrict	建外街道	Jiànwài Jiēdào	36,414	4.40
Chaowai Subdistrict	朝外街道	Cháowài Jiēdào	33,212	2.20
Hujialou Subdistrict	呼家楼街道	Hūjiālóu Jiēdào	53,018	2.80
Sanlitun Subdistrict	三里屯街道	Sānlǐtún Jiēdào	32,347	2.90
Zuojiazhuang Subdistrict	左家庄街道	Zuǒjiāzhuāng Jiēdào	70,245	4.17
Xiangheyuan Subdistrict	香河园街道	Xiānghéyuán Jiēdào	43,002	2.50
Hepingjie Subdistrict	和平街街道	Hépíngjiē Jiēdào	81,180	4.54
Anzhen Subdistrict	安贞街道	Ānzhēn Jiēdào	57,016	3.60
Yayuncun Subdistrict	亚运村街道	Yàyùncūn Jiēdào	67,745	5.13
Xiaoguan Subdistrict	小关街道	Xiǎoguān Jiēdào	61,966	2.58
Jiuxianqiao Subdistrict	酒仙桥街道	Jiǔxiānqiáo Jiēdào	63,911	5.30
Maizidian Subdistrict	麦子店街道	Màizidiàn Jiēdào	30,103	6.80
Tuanjiehu Subdistrict	团结湖街道	Tuánjiéhú Jiēdào	32,091	1.23
Liulitun Subdistrict	六里屯街道	Liùlǐtún Jiēdào	75,229	4.40
Balizhuang Subdistrict	八里庄街道	Bālǐzhuāng Jiēdào	98,084	4.40
Shuangjing Subdistrict	双井街道	Shuāngjǐng Jiēdào	93,962	5.10
Jinsong Subdistrict	劲松街道	Jìnsōng Jiēdào	103,316	5.20
Panjiayuan Subdistrict	潘家园街道	Pānjiāyuán Jiēdào	102,272	4.30
Fatou Subdistrict	垡头街道	Fátóu Jiēdào	78,952	9.60
Datun Subdistrict	大屯街道	Dàtún Jiēdào	132,457	10.01
Wangjing Subdistrict	望京街道	Wàngjīng Jiēdào	146,220	10.36
Aoyuncun Subdistrict	奥运村街道	Àoyùncūn Jiēdào	109,688	19.60
Capital Airport Subdistrict	首都机场街道	Shǒudū Jīchǎng Jiēdào	16,837	12.50
Donghu Subdistrict	东湖街道	Dōnghú Jiēdào	62,467	10.40
Nanmofang Township	南磨房乡	Nánmòfáng Xiāng	127,268	10.00
Gaobeidian Township	高碑店乡	Gāobēidiàn Xiāng	109,631	15.30
Jiangtai Township	将台乡	Jiāngtái Xiāng	53,714	13.70
Taiyanggong Township	太阳宫乡	Tàiyánggōng Xiāng	86,935	5.85
Xiaohongmen Township	小红门乡	Xiǎohóngmén Xiāng	83,675	12.50
Shibalidian Township	十八里店乡	Shíbālǐdiàn Xiāng	178,177	23.30
Pingfang Township	平房乡	Píngfáng Xiāng	85,581	15.18
Dongfeng Township	东风乡	Dōngfēng Xiāng	63,236	5.30
Laiguangying Township	来广营乡	Láiguǎngyíng Xiāng	163,970	31.30
Changying Hui Ethnic Township	常营回族乡	Chángyíng Huízú Xiāng	113,891	11.30
Sanjianfang Township	三间房乡	Sānjiānfáng Xiāng	109,672	8.80
Guanzhuang Township	管庄乡	Guǎnzhuāng Xiāng	93,273	10.30
Jinzhan Township	金盏乡	Jīnzhǎn Xiāng	82,756	44.30
Sunhe Township	孙河乡	Sūnhé Xiāng	31,288	26.50
Cuigezhuang Township	崔各庄乡	Cuīgèzhuāng Xiāng	107,029	24.40
Dongba Township	东坝乡	Dōngbà Xiāng	124,163	24.60
Heizhuanghu Township	黑庄户乡	Hēizhuānghù Xiāng	49,983	19.60
Dougezhuang Township	豆各庄乡	DòugèzhuāngXiāng	53,766	14.10
Wangsiying Township	王四营乡	Wángsìyíng Xiāng	54,679	19.30

== Government and infrastructure ==
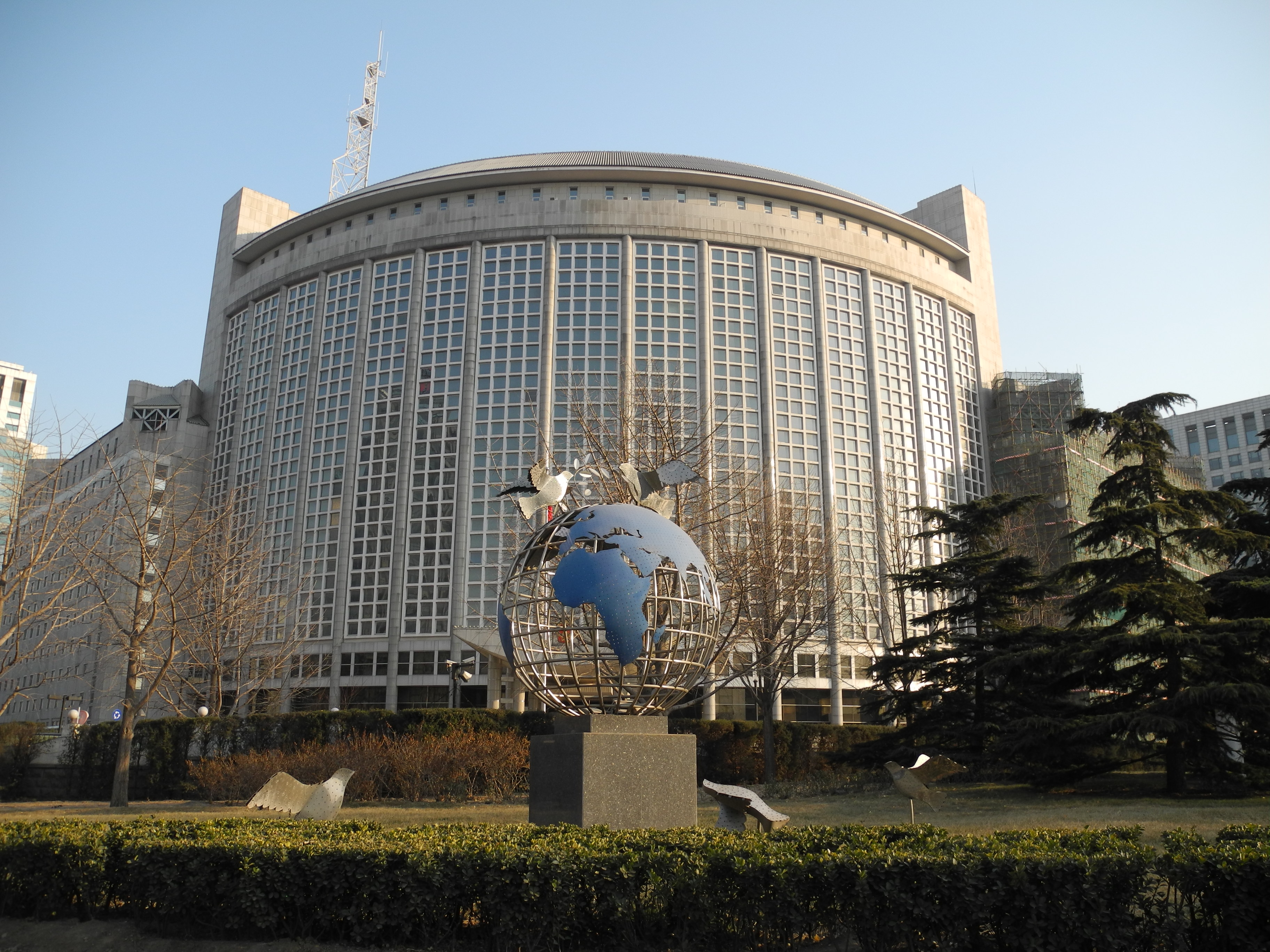
Ministry of Foreign Affairs headquarters

The Ministry of Foreign Affairs and the Ministry of Culture are headquartered in the district.

== Economy ==
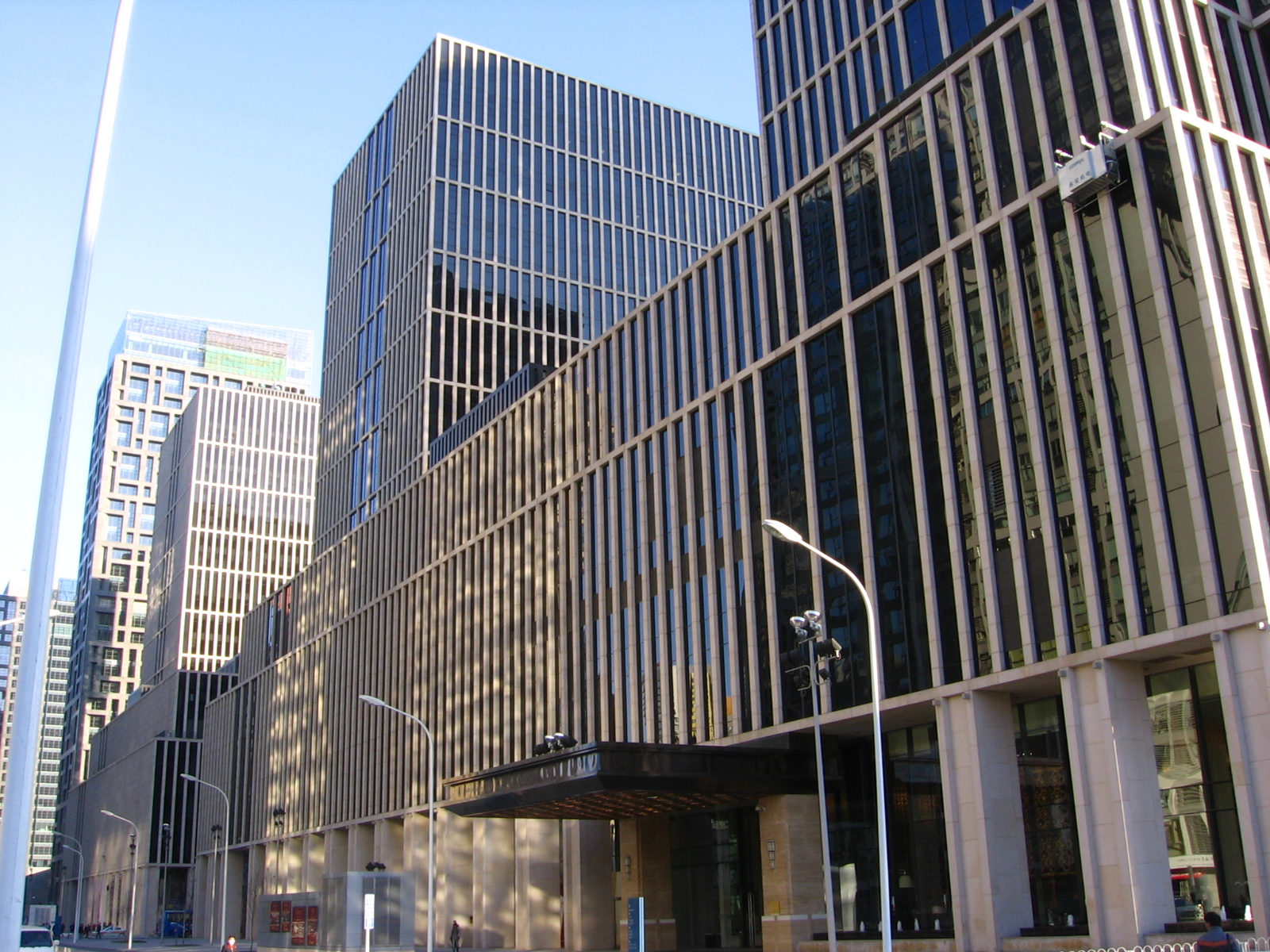
Wanda Plaza, 2007

In the year of 2022, the GDP of Chaoyang district was 791.12 billion yuan ($117.62 billion by nominal), with GDP per capita at 229,843 yuan ($34,172 by nominal).

China National Aviation Holdings Company (parent company of Air China), SOHO China, CITIC Group, Sinopec, Qihoo 360, COFCO, and Beijing Capital Airlines have their headquarters in Chaoyang District. Renren Inc. has its headquarters on the 23rd floor of the Jing An Center (静安中心; 靜安中心; Jìng'ān Zhōngxīn) in Chaoyang District.

Wanda Group has its headquarters in the Wanda Plaza (万达广场). Wanda Cinemas is headquartered in the same complex.

China Resources Beverage, the distributor of C'estbon water, has its north China regional office in the district.

=== Foreign companies ===
According to Chaoyang's official website, the district "is home to more than 60 percent of the foreign business agencies in Beijing, over 3,000 foreign companies, 167 international news agencies, and two-thirds of the 158 of the global top 500 transnational companies that have invested in Beijing." Some of these are:

ABB (China headquarters), Air France, All Nippon Airways, (Beijing Office, Beijing Fortune Building) Halliburton, IBM, KBR, Kerr-McGee China Petroleum Ltd. (an Occidental Petroleum subsidiary), Korean Air (Hyundai Motor Tower (现代汽车大厦; Xiàndài qìchē dàshà)), Kroll, Lummus Technology, a subsidiary of CB&I, Lufthansa (Beijing Lufthansa Center), Asiana Airlines, Standard & Poor's, Swire, Etihad Airways, EVA Air, and Qatar Airways.

The Hong Kong-based company Swire Properties has two locations in Chaoyang.

Beijing Hyundai Motor Company (simplified Chinese: 北京现代汽车有限公司; traditional Chinese: 北京現代汽車有限公司; pinyin: Běijīng Xiàndài Qìchē Yǒuxiàngōngsī; Korean: 북경현대), a 50–50 joint venture of the Beijing Automotive Industry Holding Co. and Hyundai Motor Company, has its sales offices in the Hyundai Motor Tower in Chaoyang District.

== Embassies ==
Chaoyang serves as Beijing's diplomatic district. All foreign embassies to China are located in the district except for that of Russia and Luxembourg, which both are in Dongcheng. Chaoyang has three embassy areas in the Ritan, Sanlitun, and Liangmaqiao neighborhoods.

== Developments ==
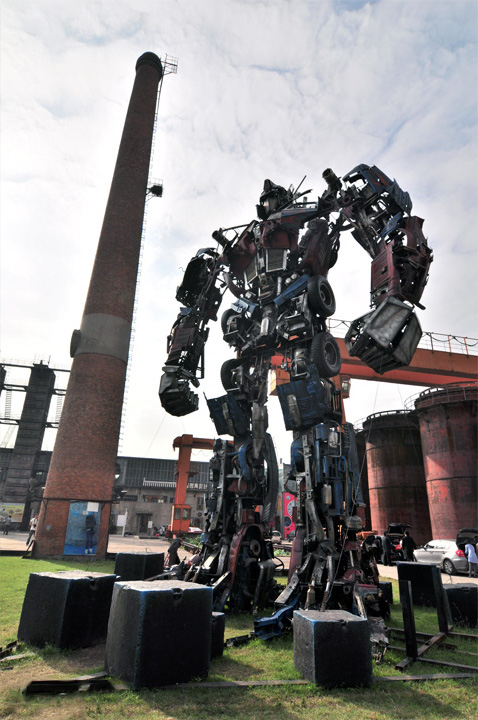
A Transformers: Dark of the Moon character in Beijing

Chaoyang District is one of the fastest growing districts in the Beijing Metropolitan Area. There are several subway lines running through the district. The Beijing Capital Airport, although surrounded by the Shunyi District, is an exclave of Chaoyang District. The municipality as well as the Chinese national government spend almost a half million USD per day on developing this district.

== Transport ==
=== Metro ===
Chaoyang is currently served by 16 metro lines of the Beijing Subway:

- Line 1 – Yong'anli 17 , Guomao 10 , Dawanglu 14 , Sihui Batong , Sihuidong Batong
- Line 2 – Jianguomen 1 , Chaoyangmen 6
- Line 3 – Workers' Stadium 17 , Tuanjiehu 10 , Chaoyang Park 14 , Shifoying, Chaoyang Railway Station, Yaojiayuan, Dongbanan, Dongba, Dongbabei 12
- Line 5 – Lishuiqiao 13 , Lishuiqiao South, Beiyuanlu North, Datunlu East 15 , Huixinxijie Beikou, Huixinxijie Nankou 10 , Hepingxiqiao 12
- Line 6 – Chaoyangmen 2 , Dongdaqiao 17 , Hujialou 10 , Jintailu 14 , Shilipu, Qingnianlu, Dalianpo, Huangqu, Changying, Caofang
- Line 7 – Shuangjing 10 , Jiulongshan 14 , Dajiaoting, Baiziwan, Huagong, Nanlouzizhuang, Happy Valley, Fatou, Shuanghe, Jiaohuachang, Huang Chang, Lang Xin Zhuang, Hei Zhuang Hu
- Line 8 – Lincuiqiao, South Gate of Forest Park, Olympic Park 15 , Olympic Sports Center, Beitucheng 10 , Anhuaqiao 12
- Line 10 – Jiandemen, Beitucheng 8 , Anzhenmen, Huixinxijie Nankou 5 , Shaoyaoju 13 , Taiyanggong 17 , Sanyuanqiao 12 Capital Airport , Liangmaqiao, Agricultural Exhibition Center, Tuanjiehu 3 , Hujialou 6 , Jintaixizhao, Guomao 1 , Shuangjing 7 , Jinsong, Panjiayuan, Shilihe 14 17 , Chengshousi
- Line 12 – Anhua Qiao 8 , Anzhen Qiao, Heping Xiqiao 5 , Guangxi Men 13 , Xibahe 17 , Sanyuanqiao 10 Capital Airport , Jiangtaixi, Tuofangying, Dongbaxi, Dongbabei 3
- Line 13 – Lishuiqiao 5 , Beiyuan, Wangjing West 15 , Shaoyaoju 10 , Guangximen 12 , Liufang
- Line 14 – Shilihe 10 17 , Beigongda Ximen, Pingleyuan, Jiulongshan 7 , Dawanglu 1 , Jintailu 6 , Zaoying, Chaoyang Park 3 , Dongfengbeiqiao, Jiangtai, Wangjing South, Futong, Wangjing 15 , Donghuqu, Laiguangying, Shangezhuang
- Line 15 – Olympic Park 8 , Anlilu, Datunlu East 5 , Guānzhuang, Wangjingxi 13 , Wangjing 14 ,Wangjingdong, Cuigezhuang, Maquanying, Sunhe
- Line 17 – Qingheying, Hongjunying, Taiyanggong 10 , Xibahe 12 , Zuojiazhuang, Workers' Stadium 3 , Dongdaqiao 6 , Yong'an Li 1 , Panjiayuanxi, Shilihe 10 14 , Zhoujiazhuang, Shibalidian
- Capital Airport Express – Sanyuanqiao 10 , Terminal 2
- Batong line – Sihui 1 , Sihuidong 1 , Gaobeidian, Communication University of China, Shuang Qiao, Guaanzhuang, Baliqiao
- Yizhuang line – Xiaocun, Xiaohongmen

== Education ==
=== Tertiary academic institutions ===
- University of International Business and Economics (Beijing)
- Beijing International Studies University
- Communication University of China
- Beijing University of Technology

=== Public schools ===
- No.80 High School of Beijing (北京市第八十中学)
- RDFZ (Renmin University Affiliated) Chaoyang School (人大附中朝阳学校)
- RDFZ (Renmin University Affiliated) Chaoyang Branch School (人大附中朝阳分校)
- Beijing Ritan High School (北京日坛中学)
- Beijing No. 17 High School (北京市第十七中学)
- The Affiliated High School to UIBE(对外经济贸易大学附属中学)
- Beijing Chen Jing Lun High School (北京市陈经纶中学)
- Beijing Hepingjie No.1 Middle School (北京市和平街第一中学)
- The High School Affiliated to Beijing University of Technology (北京工业大学附属中学)

=== International schools and kindergartens ===
- Hope International School of Beijing
- Beijing BISS International School
- Yew Chung International School of Beijing
- Japanese School of Beijing
- Korean International School in Beijing (KISB), in Wangjing
- Harrow International School Beijing
- Canadian International School of Beijing
- Lycée Français International de Pekin (French school)
- Deutsche Botschaftsschule Peking (German school)
- Pakistan Embassy College Beijing
- Australian International School of Beijing
- Beijing World Youth Academy
- British School of Beijing Sanlitun Campus and Sanlitun Early Years Campus
- Star Education Beijing
- The International Montessori School of Beijing Cherry Tree Lane Campus
- Beanstalk International Bilingual School
- Beijing City International School
- International Academy of Beijing Lido Campus and Ya Ao Campus
- Etonkids International Kindergarten

== Notable areas ==
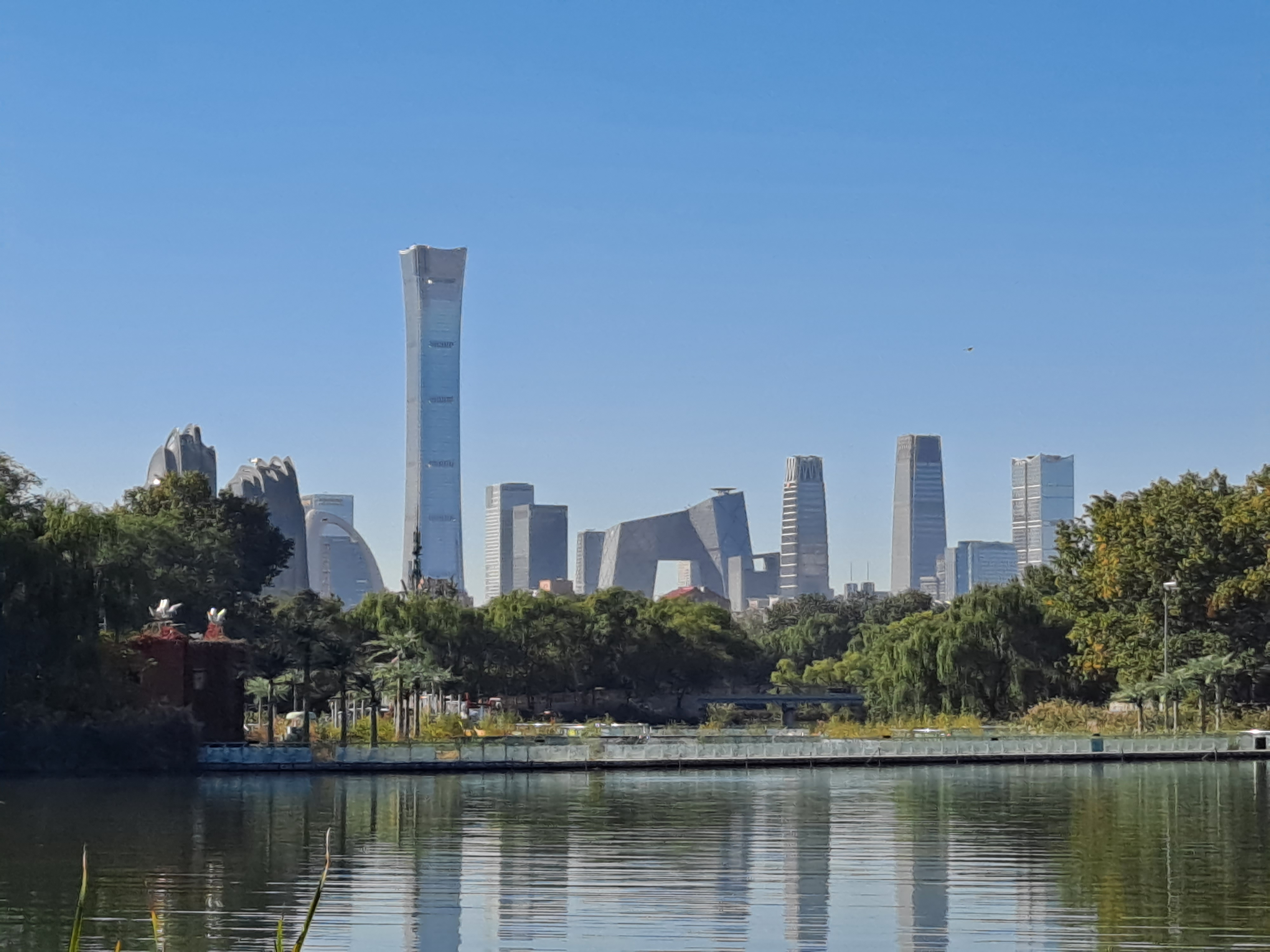
Chaoyang Park

- Beijing Central Business District (Beijing CBD)
- The China World Trade Center
- Guomao
- Chaowai
- Beijing Dongyue Temple
- Sanlitun
- Workers Stadium
- Chaoyang Park
- 798 Art Zone
- Olympic Green
- Bird's Nest
- Water Cube
- Digital Beijing Building
- Beijing Olympic Tower
- Wangjing
- Beijing Capital International Airport
- Yabaolu (Yabao Street)
- Aura Gallery
- China National Tennis Center
- National Museum for Modern Chinese Scientist
