= Aura Gallery =

Art gallery in Chaoyang, Beijing, China

- 亦安画廊
- Interactive map of the Aura Gallery area

General information
- Type: art gallery
- Location: 2 Jiuxianqiao Rd, Chaoyang, Beijing, China
- Coordinates: 39.985251°N 116.496692°E
- Opening: 2000

The Aura Gallery (simplified Chinese: 亦安画廊; traditional Chinese: 亦安畫廊; pinyin: Yìān Huàláng) is an art gallery in Chaoyang District, Beijing, China.

== History ==
Established in Shanghai, the gallery opened in 2000. Since its establishment, the gallery has become a leader in the search and promotion of Chinese contemporary art. In August 2009, the gallery was moved to Chaoyang District in Beijing.

The gallery also works to promote Western art into the Asian markets. The gallery also provides its services to organizations and individual collectors.

== Exhibitions ==
The gallery has exhibited numerous art including Art Beijing, SH Contemporary, Luo Quanmu - Butterfly Catching, and BANG!: Liu Dahong and Qu Guangci.

== Taiwan branch ==
The gallery plans to establish a branch in Taiwan in April 2014 at Dunhua South Road, Daan, Taipei at a cost of NT$ 150 million.
