= Pingfang, Beijing =

Pingfang Township 平房乡
- Township
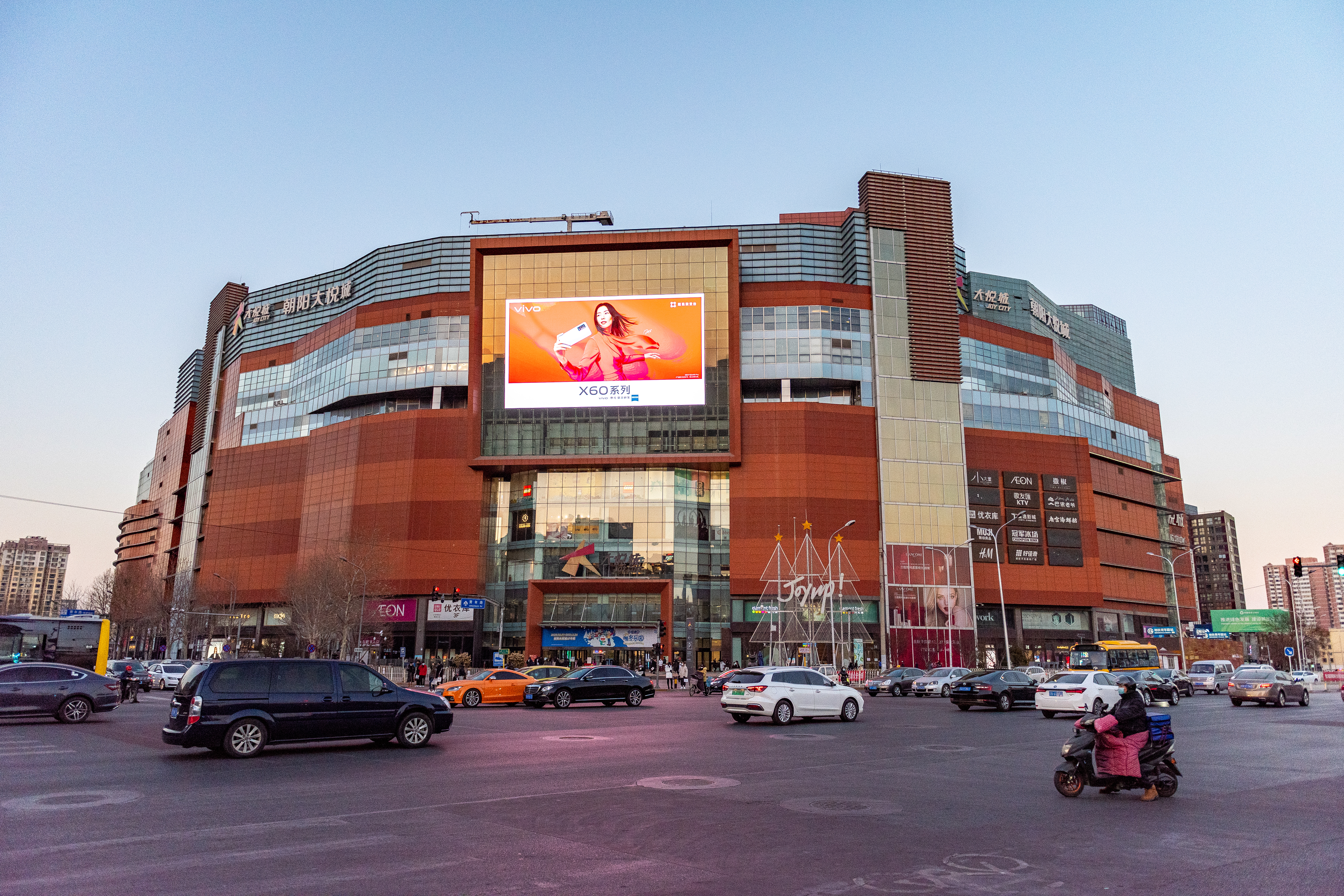
- Chaoyang Joy City on the southwest of the township, 2021

- Location within Beijing Location within China
- Coordinates: 39°55′53″N 116°34′52″E
- Country: China
- Municipality: Beijing
- District: Chaoyang
- Village-level Divisions: 14 communities 4 villages

Area
  - Total: 15.18 km^{2} (5.86 sq mi)

Population (2020)
  - Total: 85,581
  - Density: 5,638/km^{2} (14,600/sq mi)
- Time zone: UTC+8 (China Standard)
- Postal code: 100123
- Area code: 010

Pingfang Township (Chinese: 平房乡; pinyin: Píngfáng Xiāng) is a township on the eastern part of Chaoyang District, Beijing, China. It borders Dongba and Changying Townships to the north, Changying Township to the east, Sanjianfang and Gaobeidian Townships to the south, Balizhuang and Liulitun Subdistricts as well as Dongfeng Township to the west. In 2020, it has a total population of 85,581.

The subdistrict was named after Pingfang (Chinese: 平房; lit. 'Flat House', 'Single-storey House') Village within the area.

== History ==
Timeline of changes in the status of Pingfang Township
Time	Status
Ming dynasty	Part of Daxing County, Shuntian Prefecture
1912	Part of 1st Suburban District and Tong County
1950	Part of Dongjiao District, contained 3 villages under it: Pingfang, Liangmachang and Baijialou
1956	Shigezhuang and the 3 villages combined to form Pingfang Agricultural Production Cooperative
1958	Part of Chaoyang People's Commune
1961	Separated from Chaoyang and formed its own commune
1983	Reorganized into a township
2003	Becoming an area while retaining township status

== Administrative Divisions ==
In the year 2021, Pingfang Township has 18 subdivisions, in which 14 are communities and 4 are villages:

Administrative Division Code	Community Name in Simplified Chinese	Community Name in English	Type
110105029012	平房	Pingfang	Community
110105029016	富华家园	Fuhua Jiayuan	Community
110105029017	姚家园西	Yaojiayuanxi	Community
110105029018	星河湾	Xinghewan	Community
110105029019	华纺易城	Huafang Yicheng	Community
110105029020	国美家园	Guomei Jiayuan	Community
110105029021	雅成里	Yachengli	Community
110105029022	定福家园南	Dingfu Jiayuannan	Community
110105029024	天鹅湾	Tian'e Wan	Community
110105029026	青年路	Qingnianlu	Community
110105029027	姚家园东	Yaojiayuandong	Community
110105029028	逸翠园	Yicuiyuan	Community
110105029030	泓鑫家园	Hongxin Jiayuan	Community
110105029031	国美家园第二	Guomei Jiayuan Di'er	Community
110105029200	平房	Pingfang	Village
110105029202	姚家园	Yaojiayuan	Desakota
110105029203	黄渠	Huangqu	Village
110105029204	石各庄	Shigezhuang	Desakota

== See also ==
- List of township-level divisions of Beijing
