= National Museum for Modern Chinese Scientist =

Museum in Chaoyang, Beijing, China

The National Museum for Modern Chinese Scientist, located south of the National Tennis Center in Chaoyang District, Beijing, is the world's first national-level museum dedicated to scientists as a collective group. The museum aims to chronicle the academic journeys and research achievements of modern Chinese scientists, while celebrating their dedication and scientific spirit.
