= Maizidian Subdistrict =

Maizidian Subdistrict 麦子店街道
- Subdistrict
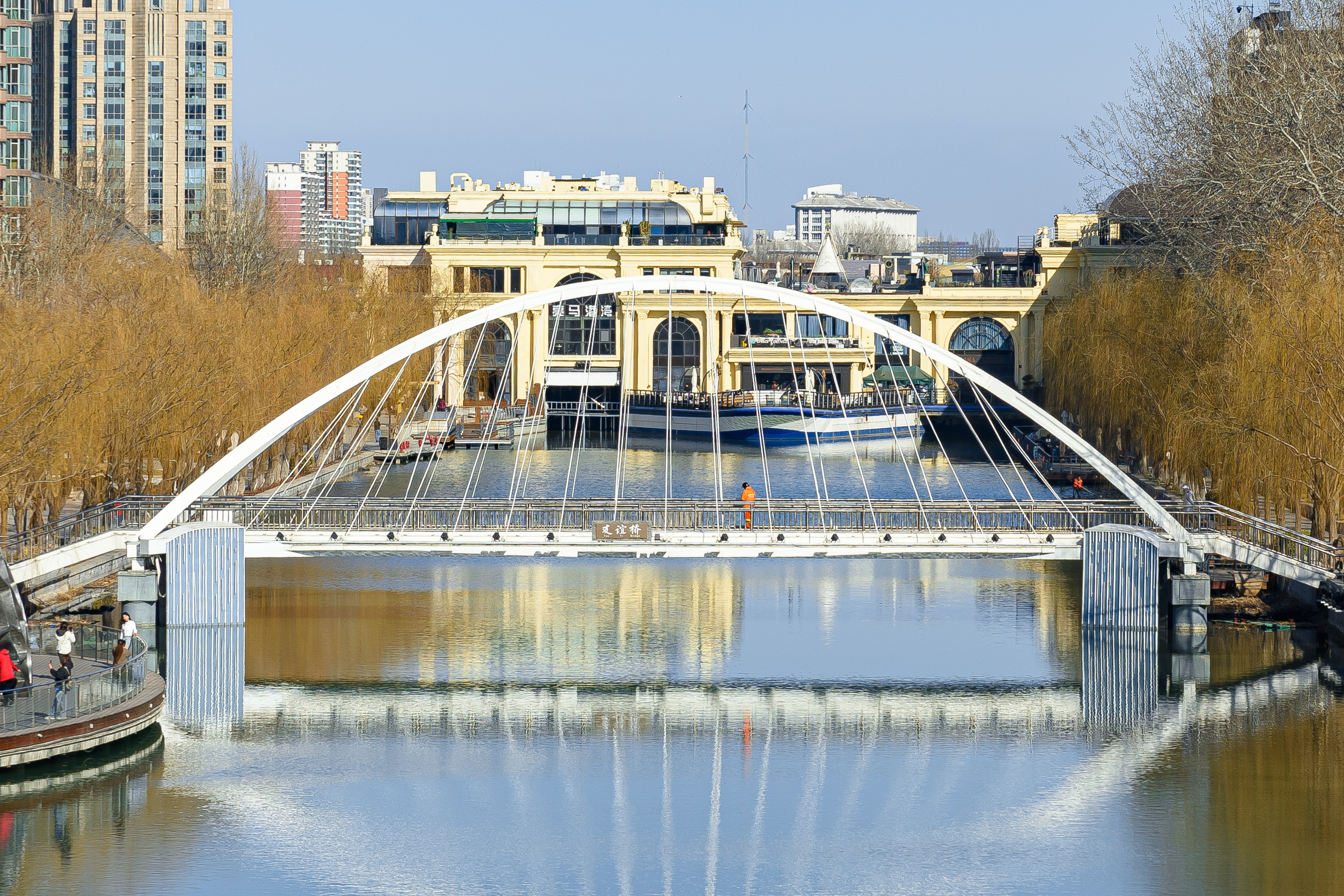
- Liangmaqiao within the subdistrict, 2024

- Location within Beijing Location within China
- Coordinates: 39°56′44″N 116°27′58″E
- Country: China
- Municipality: Beijing
- District: Chaoyang

Area
  - Total: 6.8 km^{2} (2.6 sq mi)
- Elevation: 44 m (144 ft)

Population (2020)
  - Total: 30,143
  - Density: 4,400/km^{2} (11,000/sq mi)
- Time zone: UTC+8 (China Standard)
- Postal code: 100125
- Area code: 010

Maizidian Subdistrict (simplified Chinese: 麦子店街道; traditional Chinese: 麥子店街道; pinyin: Màizidiàn Jiēdào; lit. 'wheat store') is a subdistrict of Chaoyang District, Beijing. It borders Taiyanggong Township to the north, Jiangtai Township to the northeast, Dongfeng Township to the north, Tuanjiehu and Liulitun Subdistricts to the south, Sanlitun Subdistrict to the west, and Zuojiazhuang Subdistrict to the northwest. As of 2020, it has a total population of 30,143.

== History ==
The subdistrict was formed in 1987, when Nongzhan Nanli, Xiaguangli, Quanguo Nongye Zhanlanguan Communities were separated from their respective subdistricts and merged into the Maizidian Subdistrict.

== Administrative Divisions ==
Up to the end of 2021, there are 7 communities within the subdistrict:

Administrative Division Code	Community Name in English	Community Name in Simplified Chinese
110105012021	Zaoying Nanli	枣营南里
110105012022	Zaoying Beili	枣营北里
110105012023	Xiaguangli	霞光里
110105012024	Nongzhan Nanli	农展南里
110105012025	Chaoyang Gongyuan	朝阳公园
110105012026	Zaoying	枣营
110105012027	Liangma	亮马

== Landmark ==
- Chaoyang Park

== See also ==
- List of township-level divisions of Beijing
