= Yayuncun Subdistrict =

Yayuncun Subdistrict 亚运村街道
- Subdistrict
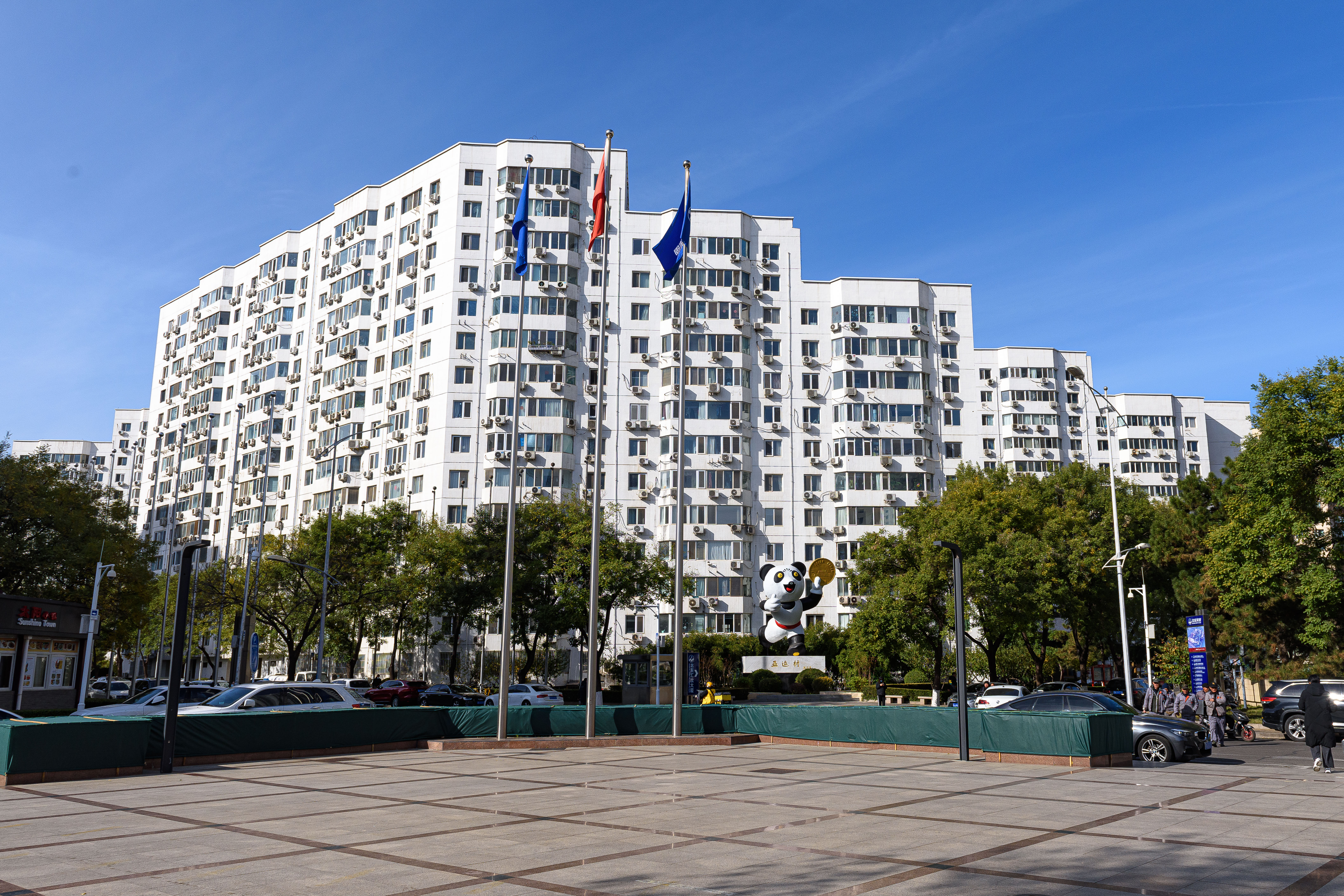
- North Star Huiyuan Service Apartments, previously served as the Asian Games Village

- Location within Beijing Location within China
- Country: China
- Municipality: Beijing
- District: Chaoyang

Area
  - Total: 5.13 km^{2} (1.98 sq mi)

Population (2020)
  - Total: 67,745
  - Density: 13,200/km^{2} (34,200/sq mi)
- Time zone: UTC+8 (China Standard)
- Postal code: 100029
- Area code: 010

Yayuncun Subdistrict (simplified Chinese: 亚运村; traditional Chinese: 亞運村; pinyin: Yàyùncūn), or Asian Games Village Subdistrict, is the site of the 1990 Asian Games, a major residential area and a subdistrict of the Chaoyang District of Beijing.

== Overview ==
Yayuncun originally referred to a series of residential high-rises and facilities built near Auhui Bridge to accommodate athletes participating in the 1990 Asian Games. It was built simultaneously with the Olympic Sports Center, both designed by Beijing Institute of Architectural Design.

After the Asian Games, Yayuncun gradually developed into a high-end residential area, with numerous buildings including the Olympic Sports Center, Beijing International Conventions Center, Beijing North Star Continental Grand Hotel, Beijing North Star Shopping Center, Celebrity International Grand Hotel, Yuanda Center, and Yan Huang Art Museum. The Fourth World Conference on Women was also held in Yayuncun. The 4th Ring Road crosses the southern proportion of the area.

The Olympic Green is located at the west of Yayuncun.

== History ==
Timetable of changes in the status of Yayuncun Subdistrict
Year	Status
1925	Part of North Suburban District
1947	Part of 7th Suburban District
1952	Part of East Suburban District
1958	Part of Datun, Wali Townships and Xiaoguan Subdistrict
1986	Construction began in preparation for 1990 Asian Games
1989	Yayuncun Subdistrict was formally created

== Administrative Divisions ==
At the end of 2021, there are a total of 13 communities within the subdistrict:

Administrative Division Code	Community Name in English	Community Name in Chinese
110105009046	Anhuili	安慧里
110105009047	Anhuilinan	安慧里南
110105009048	Huayan Beili	华严北里
110105009049	Huayan Beilixi	华严北里西
110105009050	Anxiangli	安翔里
110105009051	Sizhuyuan	丝竹园
110105009052	Beichen Donglu	北辰东路
110105009053	Anyuanli	安苑里
110105009054	Jingmin	京民
110105009055	Qijia Huozi	祁家豁子
110105009056	Anhuilibei	安慧里北
110105009057	Minzuyuan	民族园
110105009058	Anyuan Beili	安苑北里

== Landmarks ==
- China Ethnic Museum
- Olympic Sports Center
- Yuan Dadu City Wall Ruins Park

== See also ==
- List of township-level divisions of Beijing
