= Gaobeidian, Beijing =

Gaobeidian Township 高碑店乡
- Township
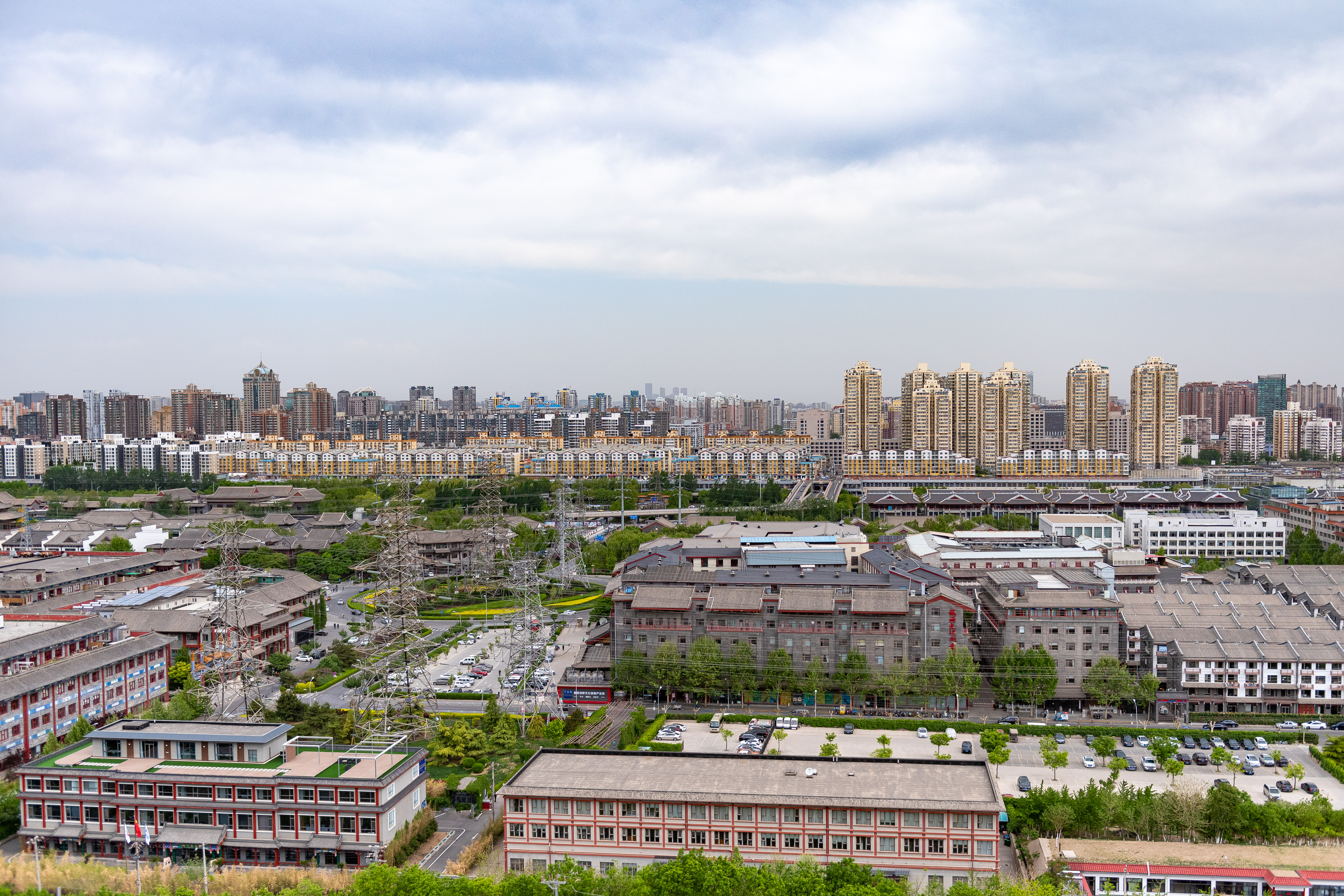
- Sihuidong within the subdistrict, 2021

- Location within Beijing Location within China
- Coordinates: 39°54′42″N 116°31′18″E
- Country: China
- Province: Beijing
- District: Chaoyang
- Village-level Divisions: 28 communities 4 villages

Area
  - Total: 15.08 km^{2} (5.82 sq mi)
- Elevation: 37 m (121 ft)

Population (2020)
  - Total: 109,631
  - Density: 7,270/km^{2} (18,830/sq mi)
- Time zone: UTC+8 (China Standard)
- Postal code: 100123
- Area code: 010

Gaobeidian Township (Chinese: 高碑店乡; pinyin: Gāobēidiàn Xiāng) is a township of Chaoyang District, Beijing, located west of and within the 5th Ring Road. It borders Pingfang Township to the north, Sanjianfang Township to the east, Dougezhuang and Wangsiying Townships to the south, Balizhuang and Jianwai Subdistricts as well as Nanmofang Township to the west. As of 2020, it has a total population of 109,631.

The name of this township, Gaobeidian (Chinese: 高碑店; lit. 'High Stele Shop'), first appear on record in 1787, along with an older name Jiaoting.

== History ==
Timeline of changes in status of Gaobeidian Township
Year	Status
1952	Part of Dongjiao District, Beijing
1954	Created as Gaobeidian Township
1958	Incorporated into People's Commune of Xingfu, Chaoyang District
1961	Separated from Xingfu and formed its own commune
1983	Restored as a township
1993	Forming an area bureau while retaining township status

== Administrative Divisions ==
As of 2021, there are 32 subdivisions within Gaobeidian Area:

Administrative Division Code	Type	Community Name (English)	Community Name (Chinese)
110105022001	Community	Ganluyuan Nanli Erqu	甘露园南里二区
110105022004	Community	Dahuangzhuang	大黄庄
110105022016	Community	Tonghui Jiayuan	通惠家园
110105022019	Community	Xinglong Jiayuan	兴隆家园
110105022020	Community	Lijing Xinju	丽景馨居
110105022021	Community	Balizhuang	八里庄
110105022022	Community	Ganluyuan Nanli Yiqu	甘露园南里一区
110105022023	Community	Kangjiayuanxi	康家园西
110105022024	Community	Kangjiayuandong	康家园东
110105022025	Community	Gaojing	高井
110105022026	Community	Taipingzhuangnan	太平庄南
110105022027	Community	Taipingzhuangbei	太平庄北
110105022028	Community	Huabeixi	花北西
110105022029	Community	Huabeidong	花北东
110105022030	Community	Beihuayuan	北花园
110105022034	Community	Gaobeidiandong	高碑店东
110105022035	Community	Gaobeidianxi	高碑店西
110105022036	Community	Fangjiayuan	方家园
110105022037	Community	Xidian	西店
110105022038	Community	Banbidian	半壁店
110105022039	Community	Xiaojiaoting	小郊亭
110105022040	Community	Gaobeidian Wenhuayuan	高碑店文化园
110105022041	Community	Huayuanzha	花园闸
110105022042	Community	Liyuanli	力源里
110105022043	Community	Shuinanzhuang	水南庄
110105022044	Community	Taipingzhuang	太平庄
110105022045	Community	Gaobeidian Gujie	高碑店古街
110105022046	Community	Huixingyuan	汇星苑
110105022201	Village	Gaojing	高井
110105022202	Village	Beihuayuan	北花园
110105022203	Village	Gaobeidian	高碑店
110105022204	Village	Banbidian	半壁店

== Gallery ==
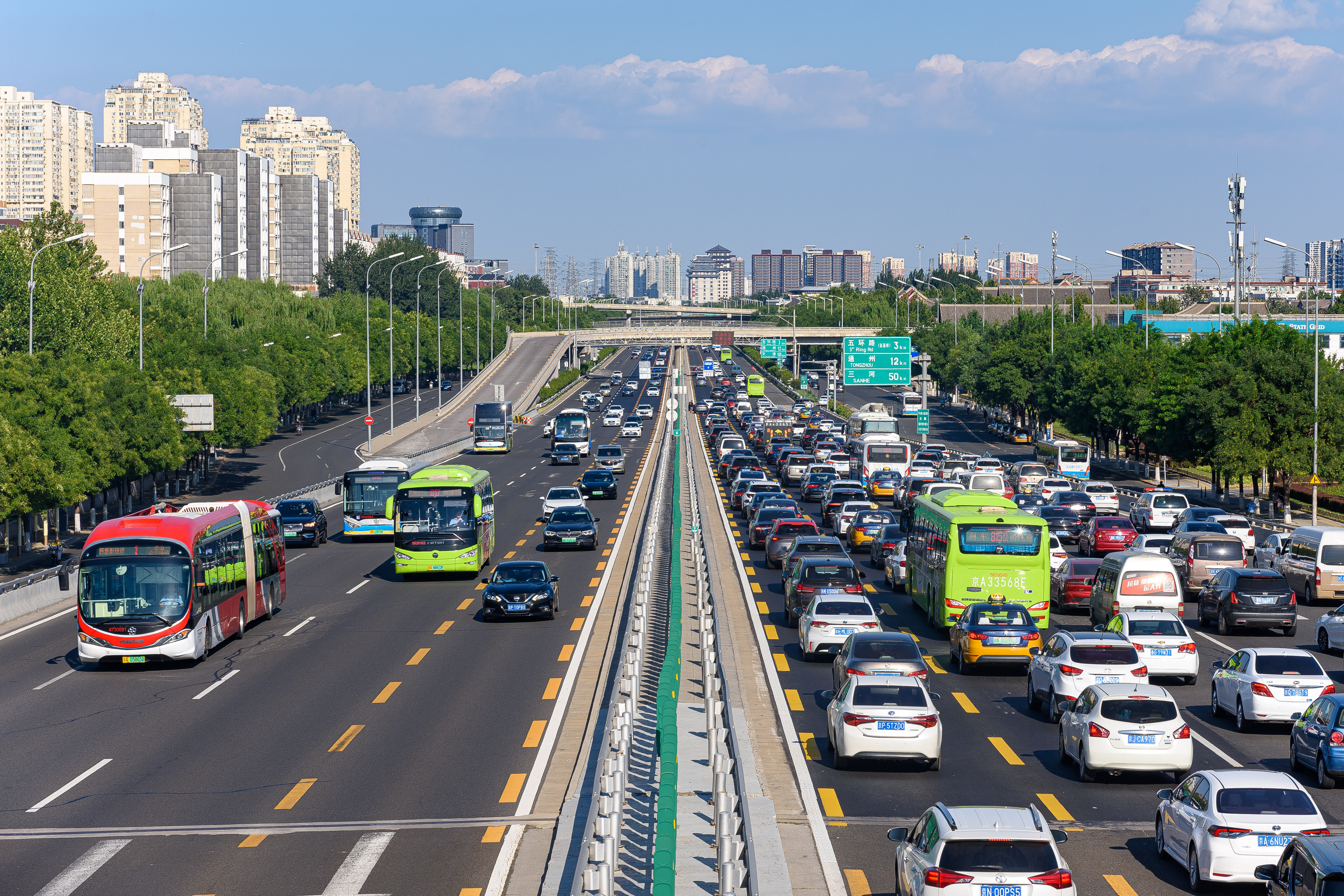
Beijing–Tongzhou Expressway that passes through the township, 2023

== See also ==
- List of township-level divisions of Beijing
