= Fatou Subdistrict =

Fatou Subdistrict 垡头街道
- Subdistrict
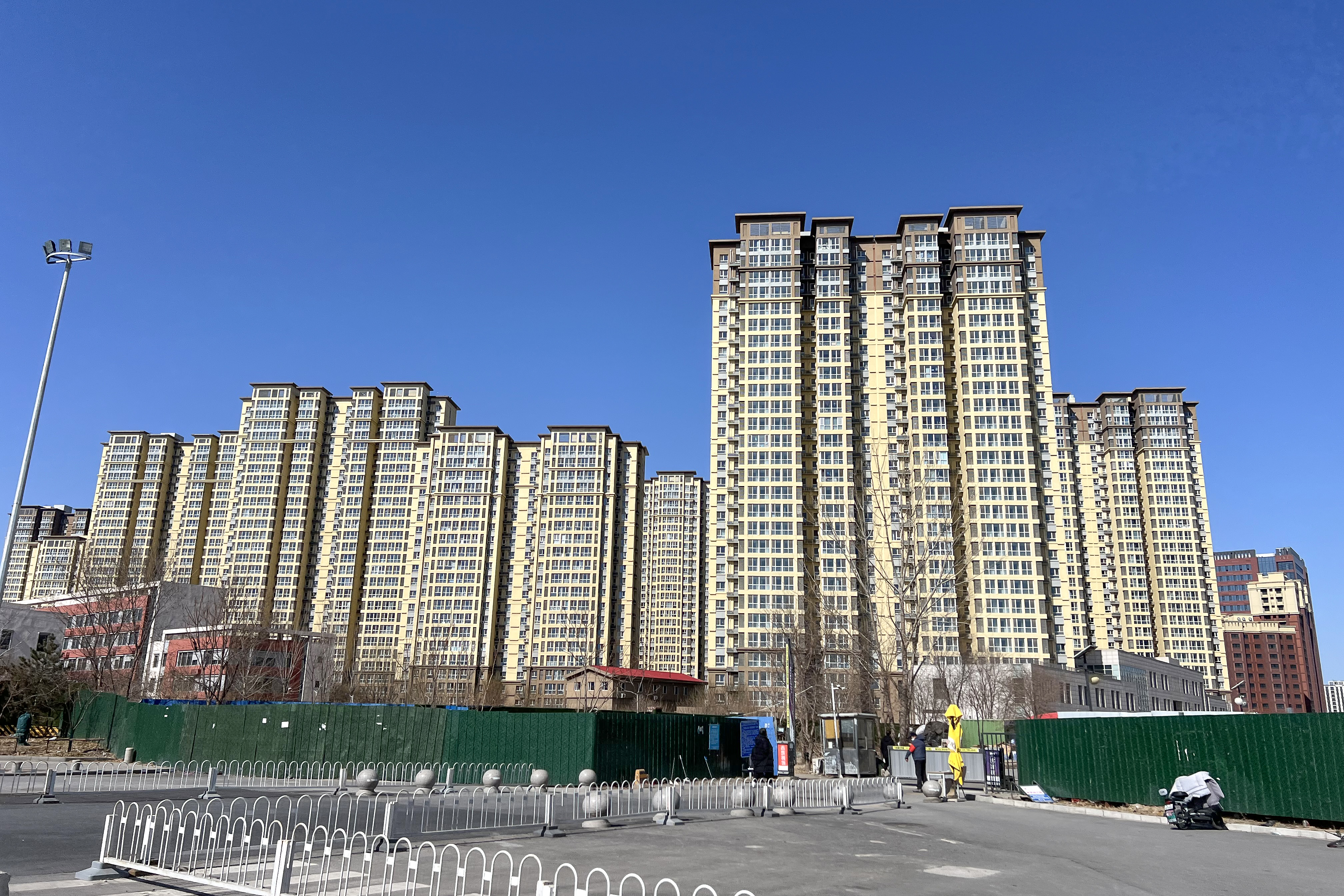
- Yanbao Qidong Community built on the site of former Beijing Coking Chemical Factory within Fatou

- Location within Beijing Location within China
- Coordinates: 39°51′59″N 116°30′14″E
- Country: China
- Municipality: Beijing
- District: Chaoyang
- Village-level Divisions: 16 communities

Area
  - Total: 9.6 km^{2} (3.7 sq mi)

Population (2020)
  - Total: 78,952
  - Density: 8,200/km^{2} (21,000/sq mi)
- Time zone: UTC+8 (China Standard)
- Postal code: 100023
- Area code: 010

Fatou Subdistrict (Chinese: 垡头街道; pinyin: Fátóu Jiēdào) is a subdistrict on the southern part of Chaoyang District, Beijing, China. It borders Wangsiying Township to the north, Dougezhuang Township to the east, Shibalidian Township to the south, and Nanmofang Township to the northwest. As of 2020, it has a total population of 78,952.

The subdistrict was named after Fatou (Chinese: 垡头; lit. 'Plough Head') Village in the area, which in turn was named so its glutinous and heavy soil during planting season. Fatou Village first appeared on record in 1593.

== History ==
Timeline of changes in the status of Fatou Subdistrict
Time	Status
1960	Created as Fatou Subdistrict
1965	Changed to People's Commune of Fatou
1968	Changed to Shuguangli Subdistrict
1978	Restored as Fatou Subdistrict

== Administrative Division ==
In 2021, there are a total of 16 communities under Fatou Subdistrict:

Administrative Division Code	Community Name in English	Community Name in Simplified Chinese
110105019013	Yiqu	一区
110105019014	Erqu	二区
110105019015	Sanqu	三区
110105019016	Dongli	东里
110105019017	Xili	西里
110105019018	Beili	北里
110105019024	Cuicheng Xinyuan	翠城馨园
110105019025	Cuicheng Yayuan	翠城雅园
110105019026	Cuicheng Quyuan	翠城趣园
110105019027	Cuicheng Shengyuan	翠城盛园
110105019028	Cuicheng Xiyuan	翠城熙园
110105019029	Shuanghe Jiayuan	双合家园
110105019030	Cuicheng Fuyuan	翠城福园
110105019031	Qidong Jiayuan	祈东家园
110105019032	Beijiao Jiayuan	北焦家园
110105019033	Shuangmei Jiayuan	双美家园
