= Beishenshu station =

Beijing Subway Line 17 station

Beishenshu 北神树
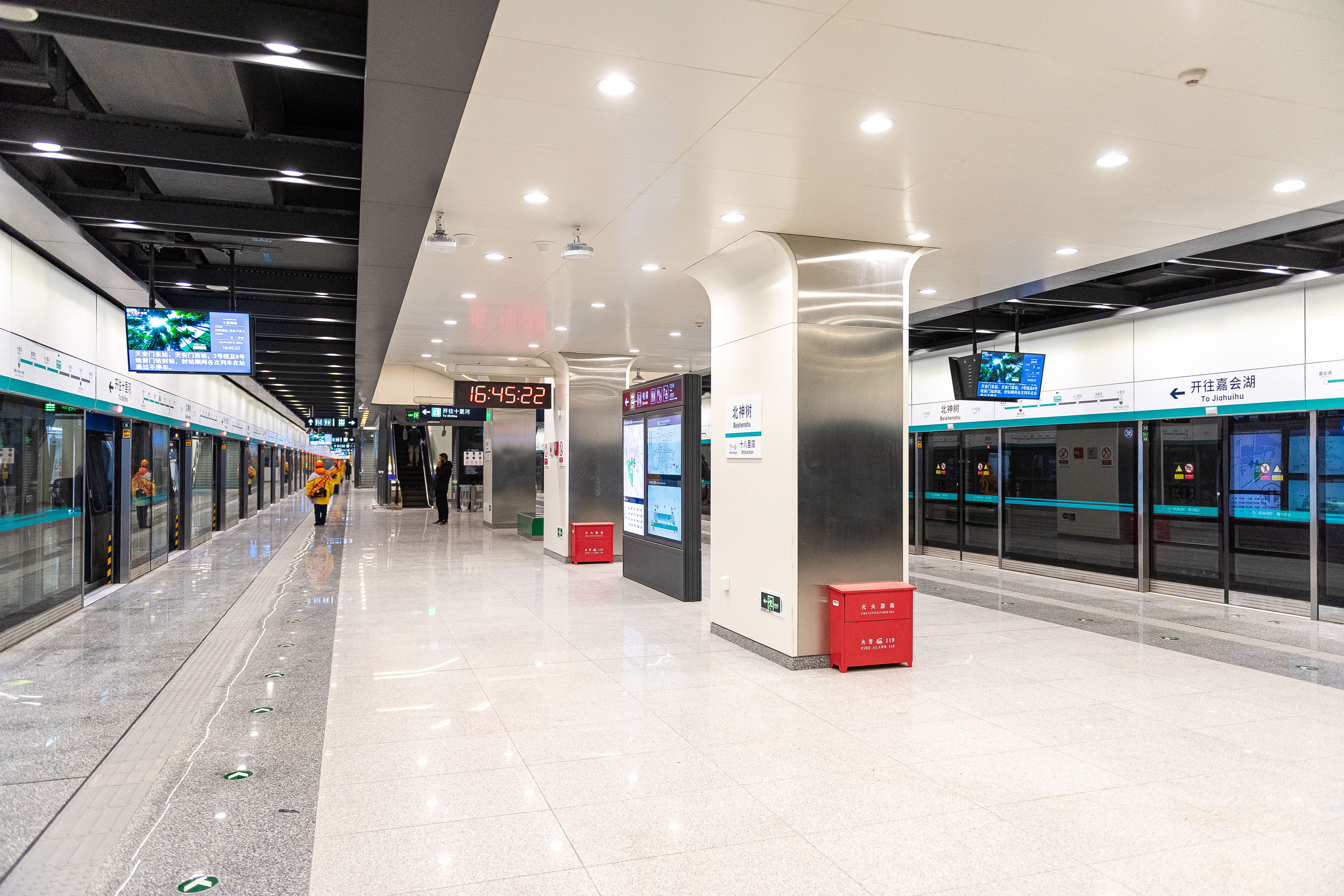
- Platform

General information
- Location: Intersection of Kechuang East 3rd Street (科创东三街) and Jiachuang 1st Road (嘉创一路); Beishenshu Village, Taihu, Tongzhou District, Beijing; China
- Coordinates: 39°49′03″N 116°32′48″E
- Operator: Beijing MTR
- Line: Line 17
- Platforms: 2 (1 island platform)
- Tracks: 2

Construction
- Structure type: Underground
- Accessible: Yes

History
- Opened: December 31, 2021; 4 years ago

Services
Preceding station	Beijing Subway	Following station
Shibalidian towards Weilaikexuechengbei (Future Science City North)	Line 17	Ciqubei towards Jiahuihu
Location
- Location within Beijing

Beishenshu station (Chinese: 北神树站; pinyin: Běishénshù zhàn) is a subway station on Line 17 of the Beijing Subway. The station opened on December 31, 2021.

== Features ==
The station has an underground island platform. There are 4 exits, lettered A, B, C and D. Exits B and D are accessible via elevators.

The artwork "Tree of Wisdom" is arranged on the station hall floor of this station. This group of works was created by Tang Jun, Jiao Le, Que Zhenxi, and Tuo Chenxi. The combination of elements implies the orderly development of biotechnology and creates a sense of space technology. Each hexagon uses movable annual rings, biological fingerprints, and ripples to describe the endless life and nature.
