= Shilihe station =

Beijing Subway interchange station

Shilihe 十里河
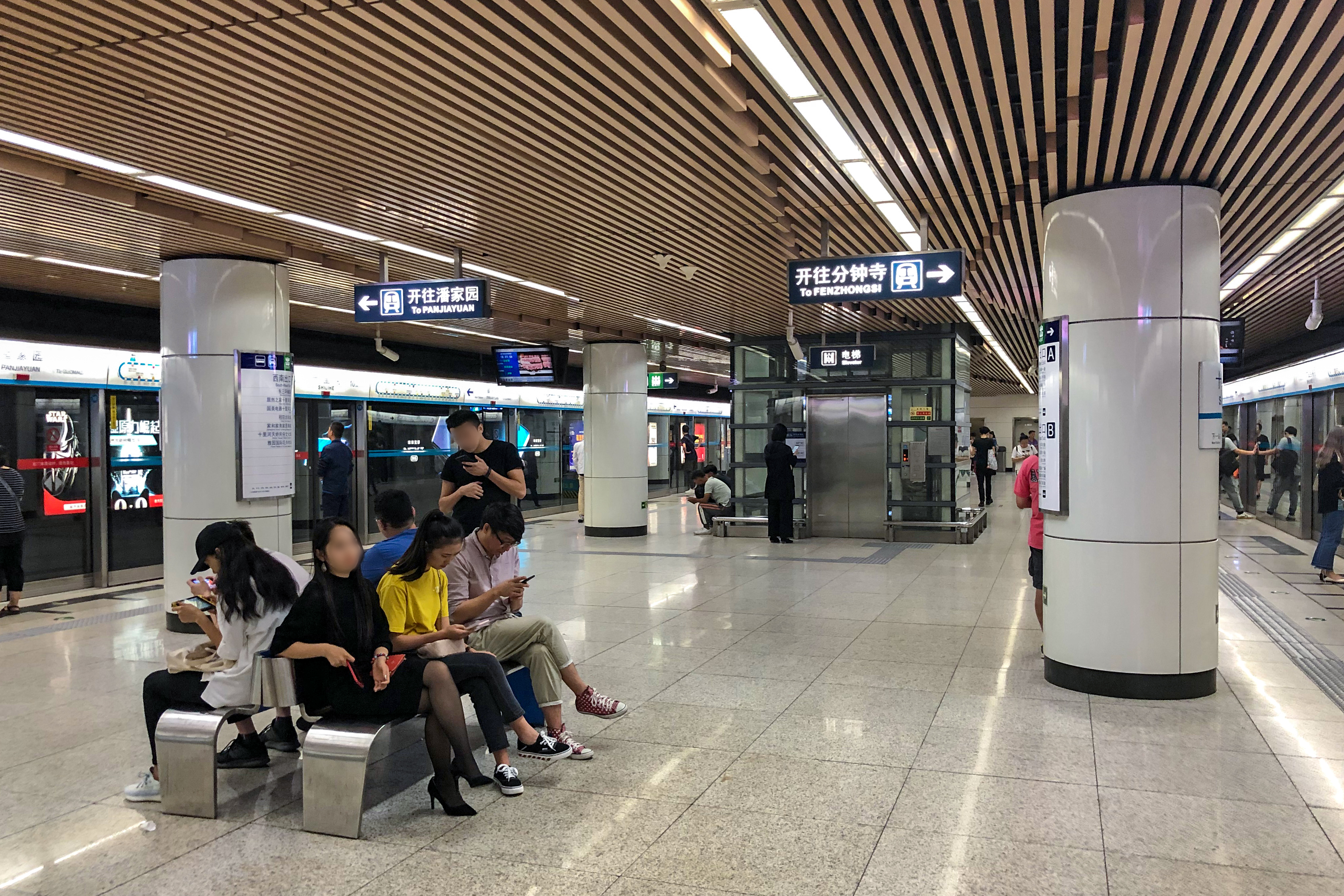
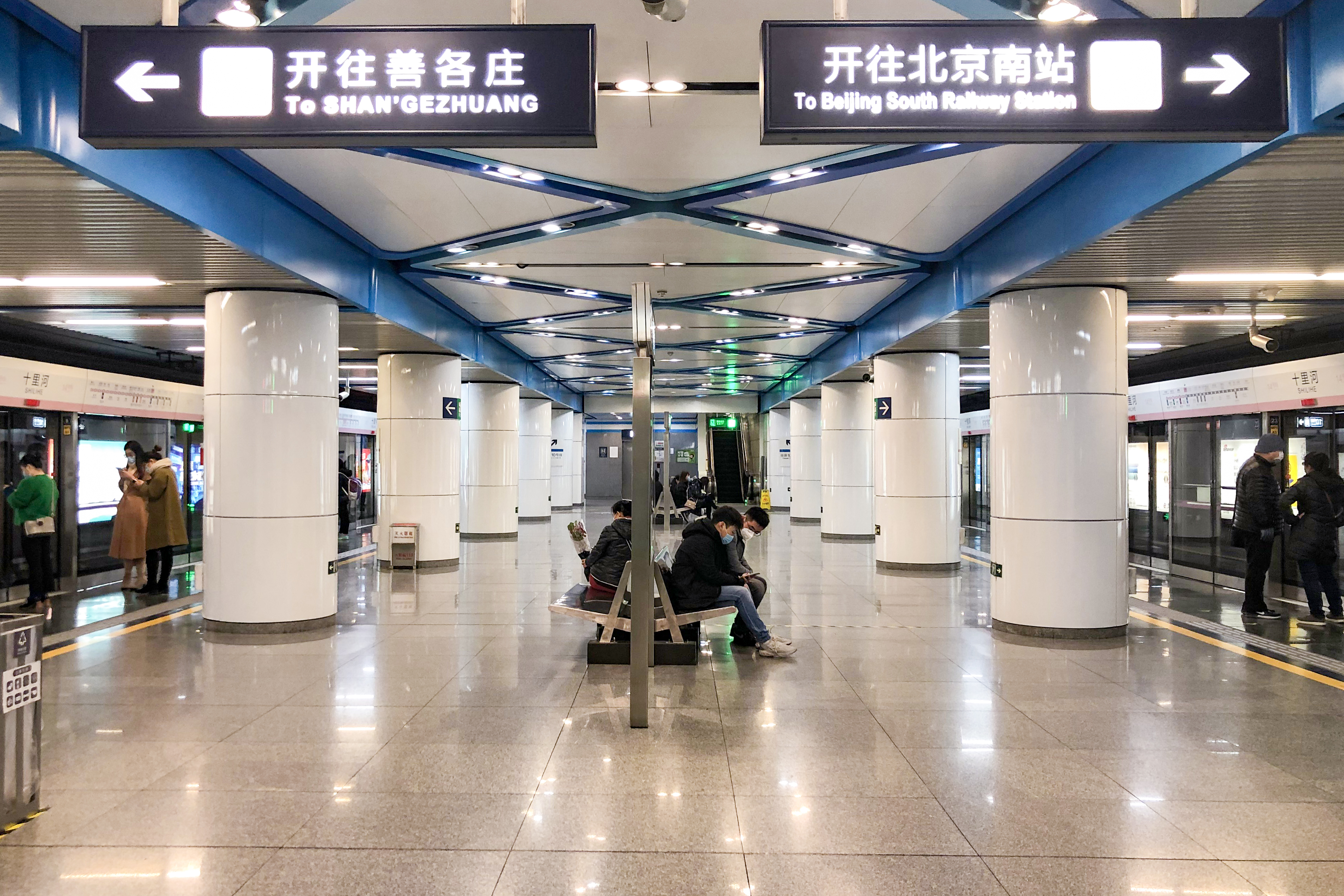
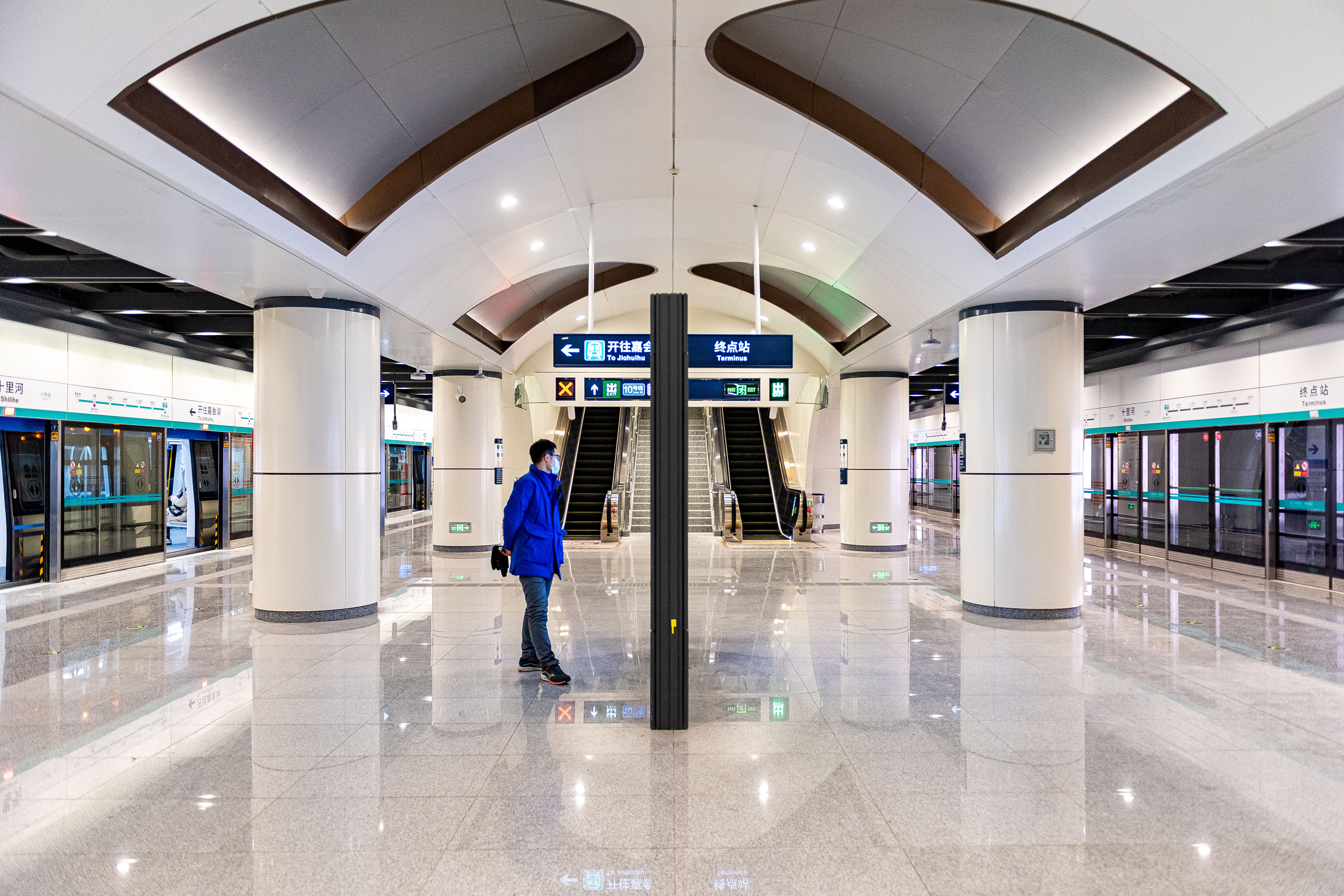
- Line 10 platform Line 14 platform Line 17 platform

General information
- Location: Shilihe Bridge, East 3rd Ring Road South and Zuo'an Road (左安路) / Dayangfang Road (大羊坊路); Shibalidian, Chaoyang District, Beijing; China
- Coordinates: 39°51′59″N 116°27′29″E
- Operator: Beijing Mass Transit Railway Operation Corporation Limited (Line 10); Beijing MTR Corporation Limited (Line 14 & Line 17)
- Lines: Line 10; Line 14; Line 17
- Platforms: 6 (3 island platforms)
- Tracks: 6

Construction
- Structure type: Underground
- Accessible: Yes

History
- Opened: Line 10: December 30, 2012; 13 years ago; Line 14: December 26, 2015; 10 years ago; Line 17: December 31, 2021; 4 years ago

Services
Preceding station	Beijing Subway	Following station
Panjia Yuan outer loop / anticlockwise	Line 10	Fenzhong Si inner loop / clockwise
Fangzhuang towards Zhangguozhuang	Line 14	Beijing Univ. of Tech. West Gate towards Shangezhuang
Panjiayuanxi towards Weilaikexuechengbei (Future Science City North)	Line 17	Zhoujiazhuang towards Jiahuihu
Location
- Location within Beijing

Shilihe station (Chinese: 十里河站; pinyin: Shílǐhé Zhàn) is an interchange station between Line 10, Line 14 and Line 17 of the Beijing Subway. Line 10 station opened on December 30, 2012. Line 14 station opened on December 26, 2015. Line 17 station opened on December 31, 2021, and served as the northern terminus of the southern section of the line until the middle section, which connects to the north section at Workers' Stadium, opened on December 27, 2025.

== Station layout ==
The line 10, line 14 and line 17 stations all have underground island platforms.

== Exits ==
There are 10 exits, lettered A, B, D, E, G, H, J, K_{1}, K_{2} and L. Exits D, G and L are accessible.

== Gallery ==
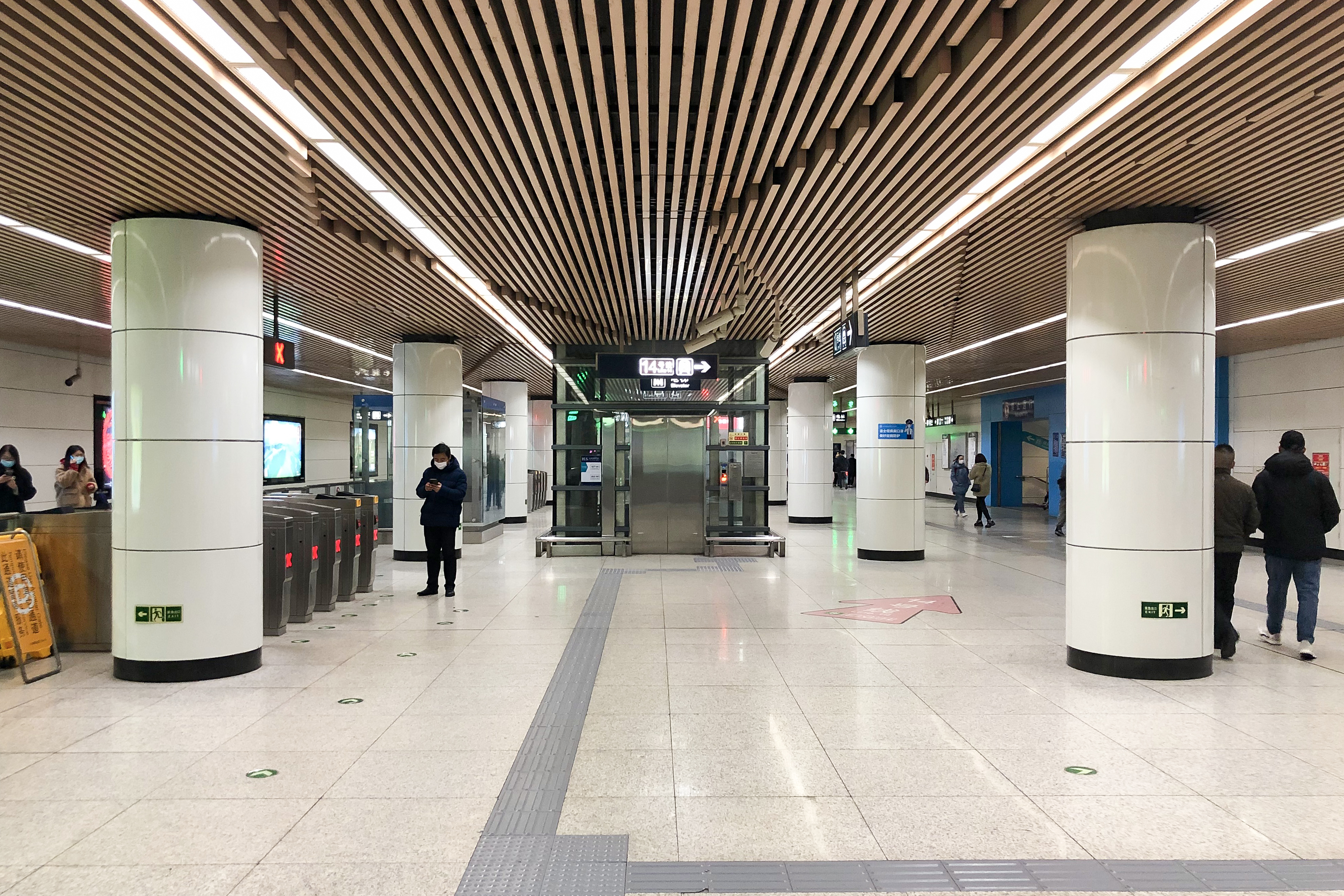
Line 10 concourse

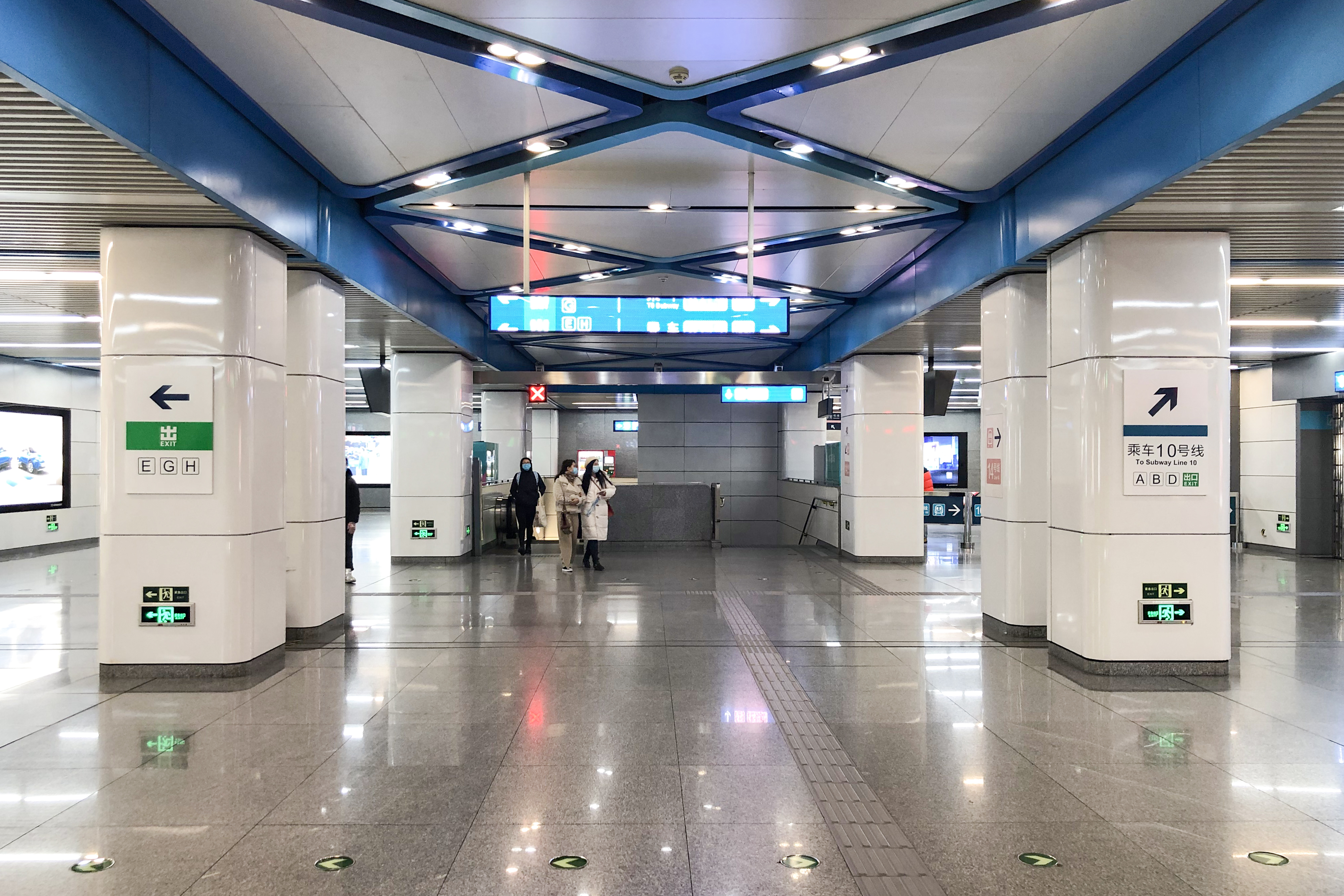
Line 14 south concourse

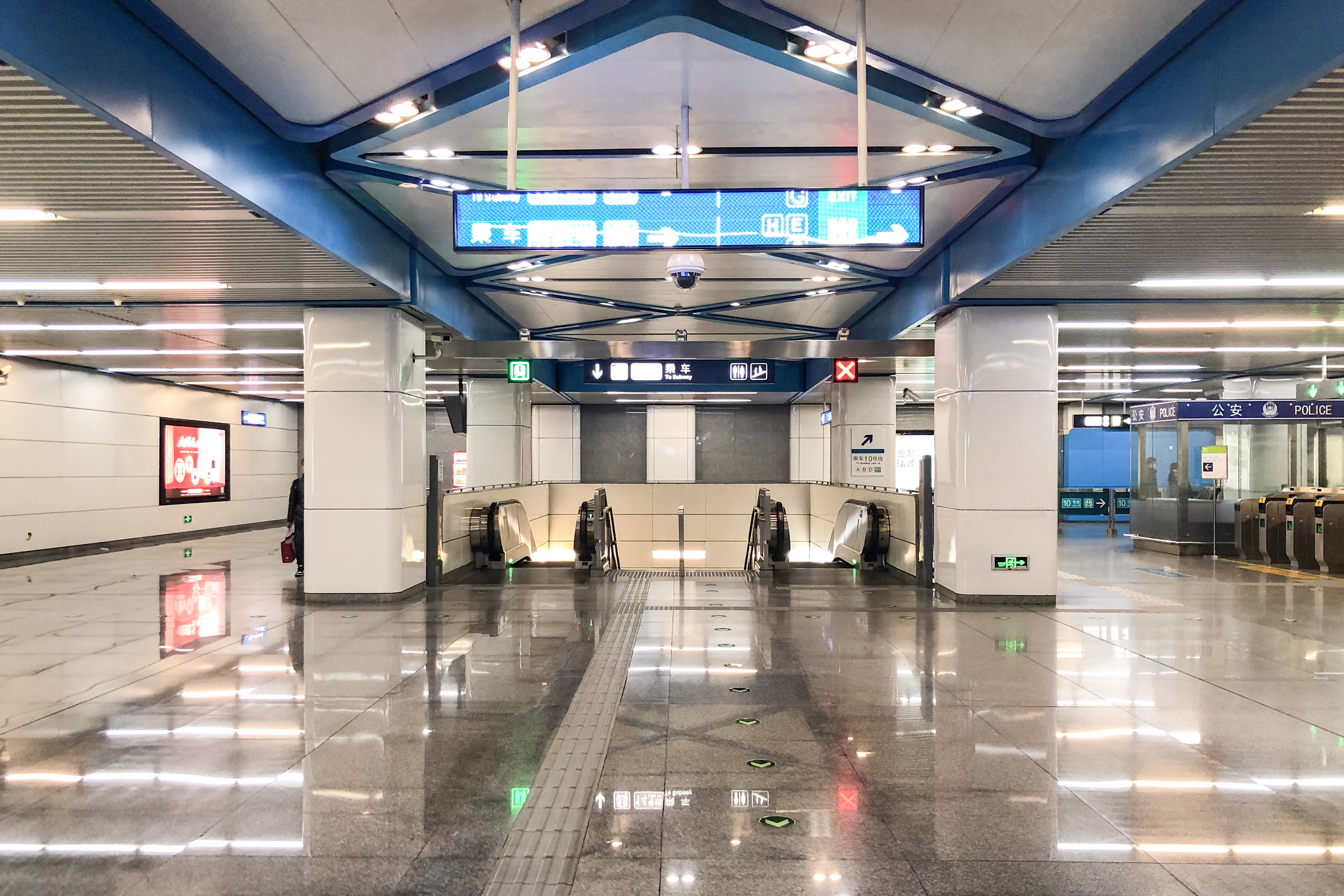
Line 14 north concourse

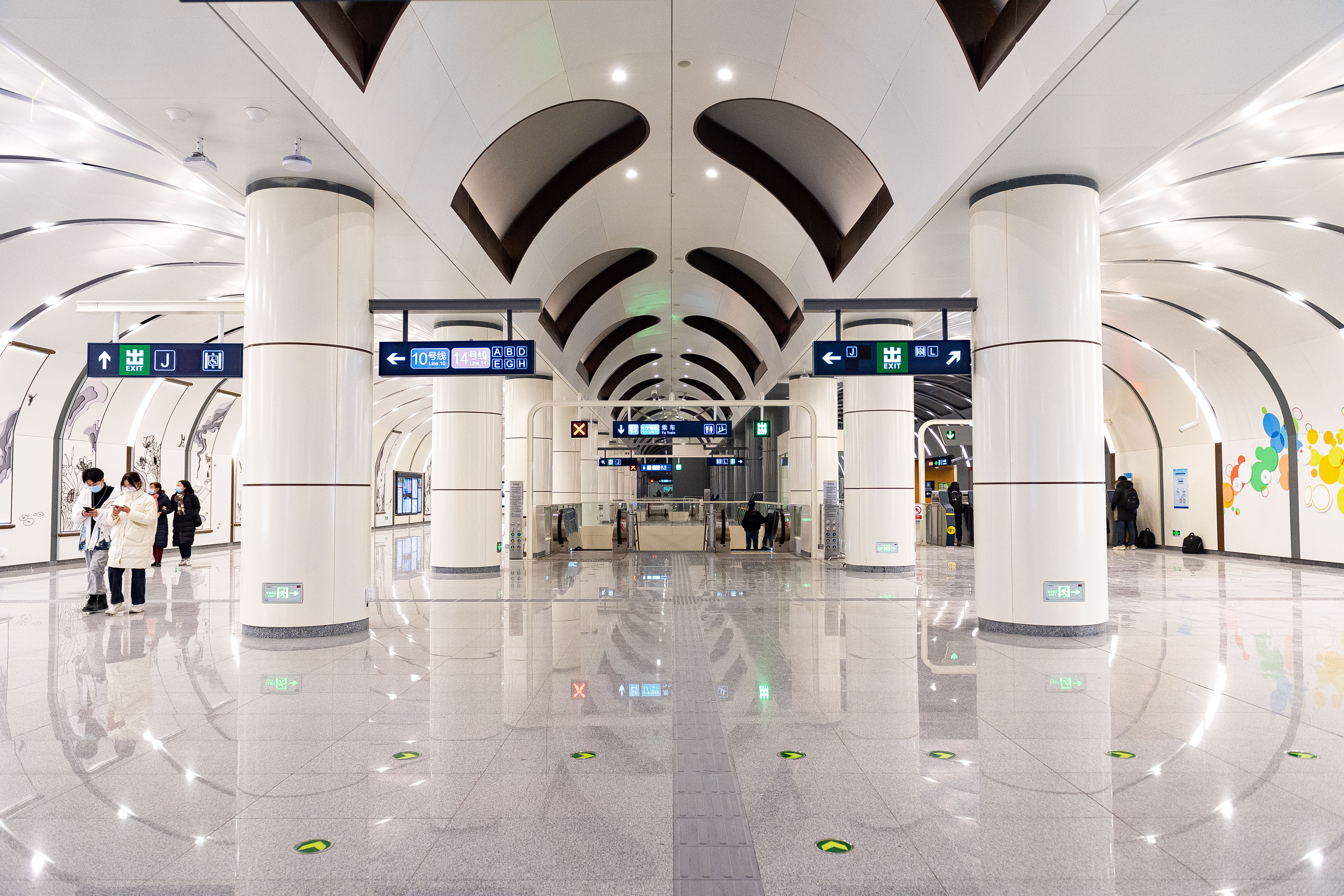
Line 17 concourse [1]

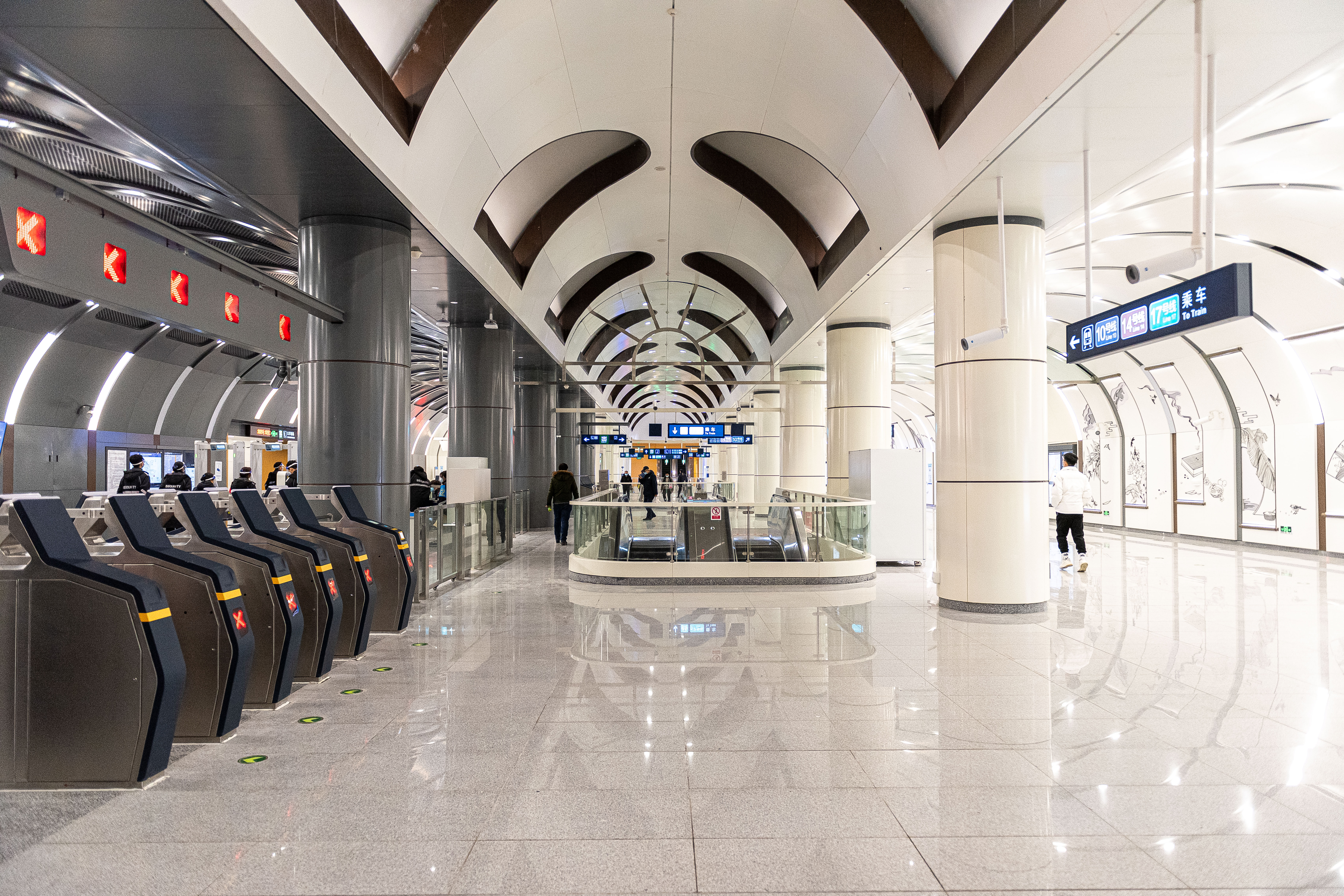
Line 17 concourse [2]
