= Ciqubei station =

Beijing Subway Line 17 station

Ciqubei 次渠北
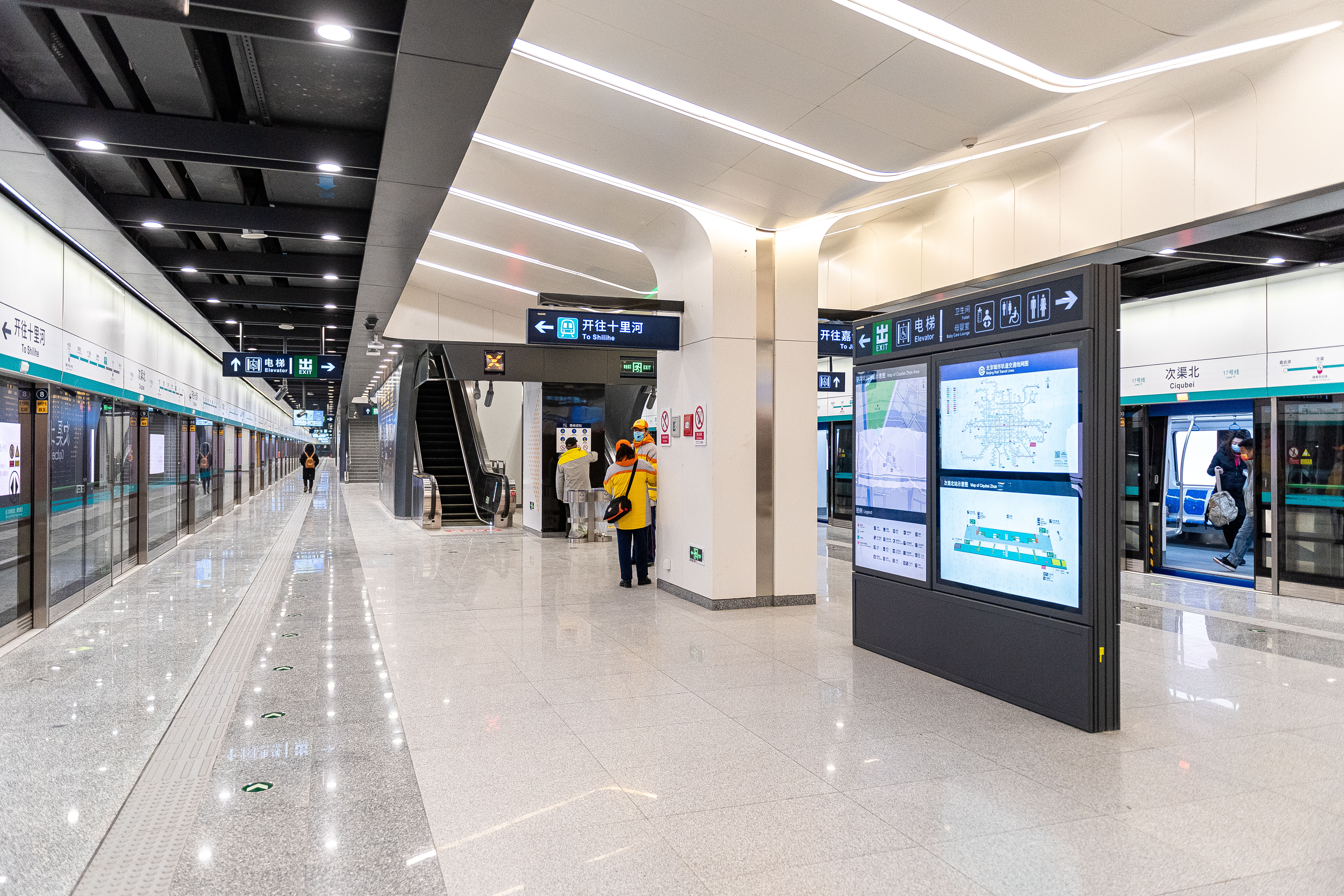
- Platform

General information
- Location: Intersection of Puxi Road (铺西路) and Nanbeili Middle Road (南北里中路); Ciqu 2nd Village, Taihu, Tongzhou District, Beijing; China
- Coordinates: 39°48′31″N 116°34′14″E
- Operator: Beijing MTR
- Line: Line 17
- Platforms: 2 (1 island platform)
- Tracks: 2

Construction
- Structure type: Underground
- Accessible: Yes

History
- Opened: December 31, 2021; 4 years ago

Services
Preceding station	Beijing Subway	Following station
Beishenshu towards Weilaikexuechengbei (Future Science City North)	Line 17	Ciqu towards Jiahuihu
Location
- Location within Beijing

Ciqubei station (Chinese: 次渠北站; pinyin: Cìqú Běi Zhàn; lit. 'Ciqu North station') is a subway station on Line 17 of the Beijing Subway. The station opened on December 31, 2021.

== Features ==
The station has an underground island platform. There are 4 exits, lettered A, B, C and D. Exits A and D are accessible via elevators.

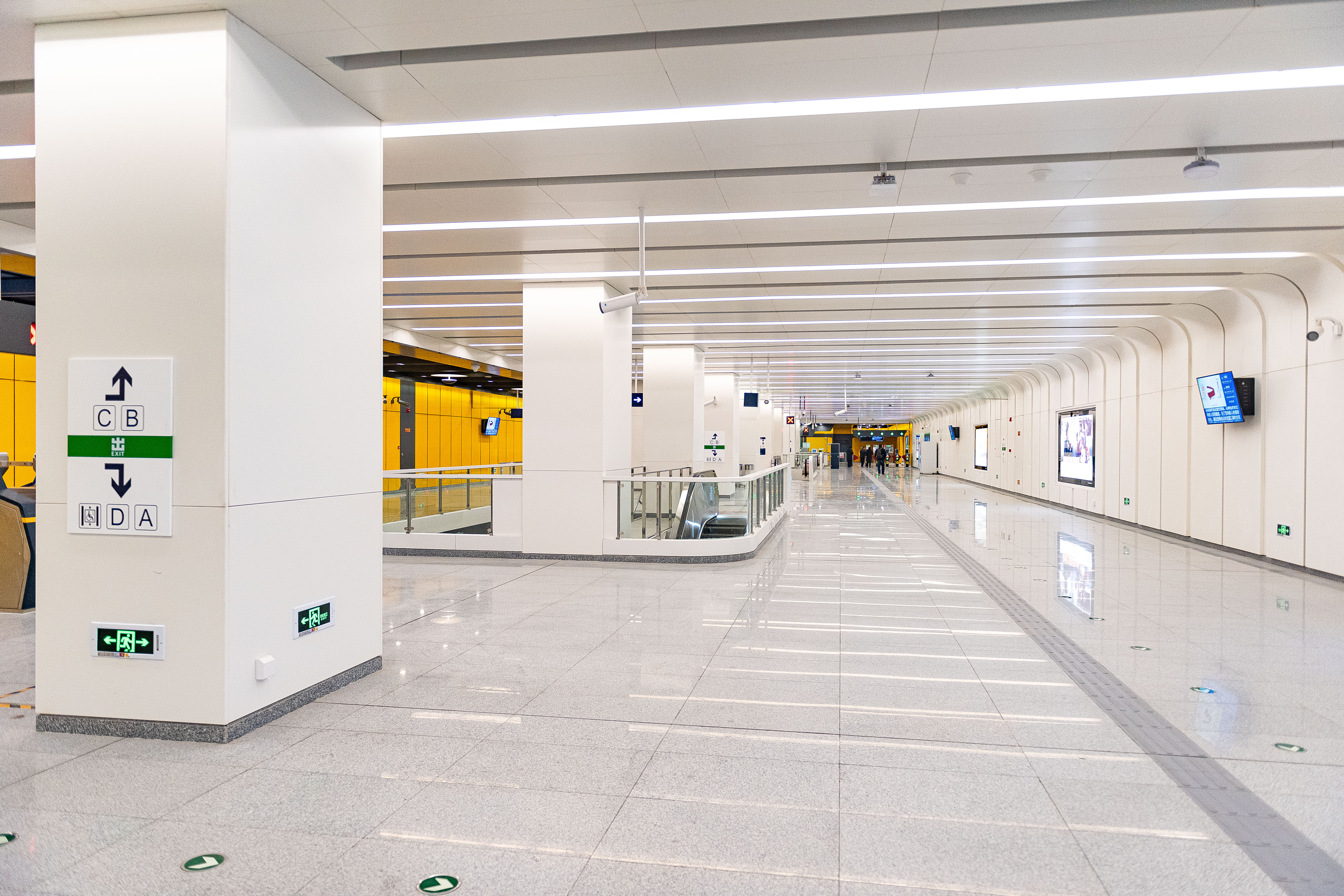
Concourse
