= Workers' Stadium station =

Beijing Subway Line 3 and Line 17 station

Workers' Stadium (Note: Line 3 use the English-only translation Workers' Stadium Station; also known as Gongrentiyuchang Zhan (Workers' Stadium Station) on Line 17.) 工人体育场
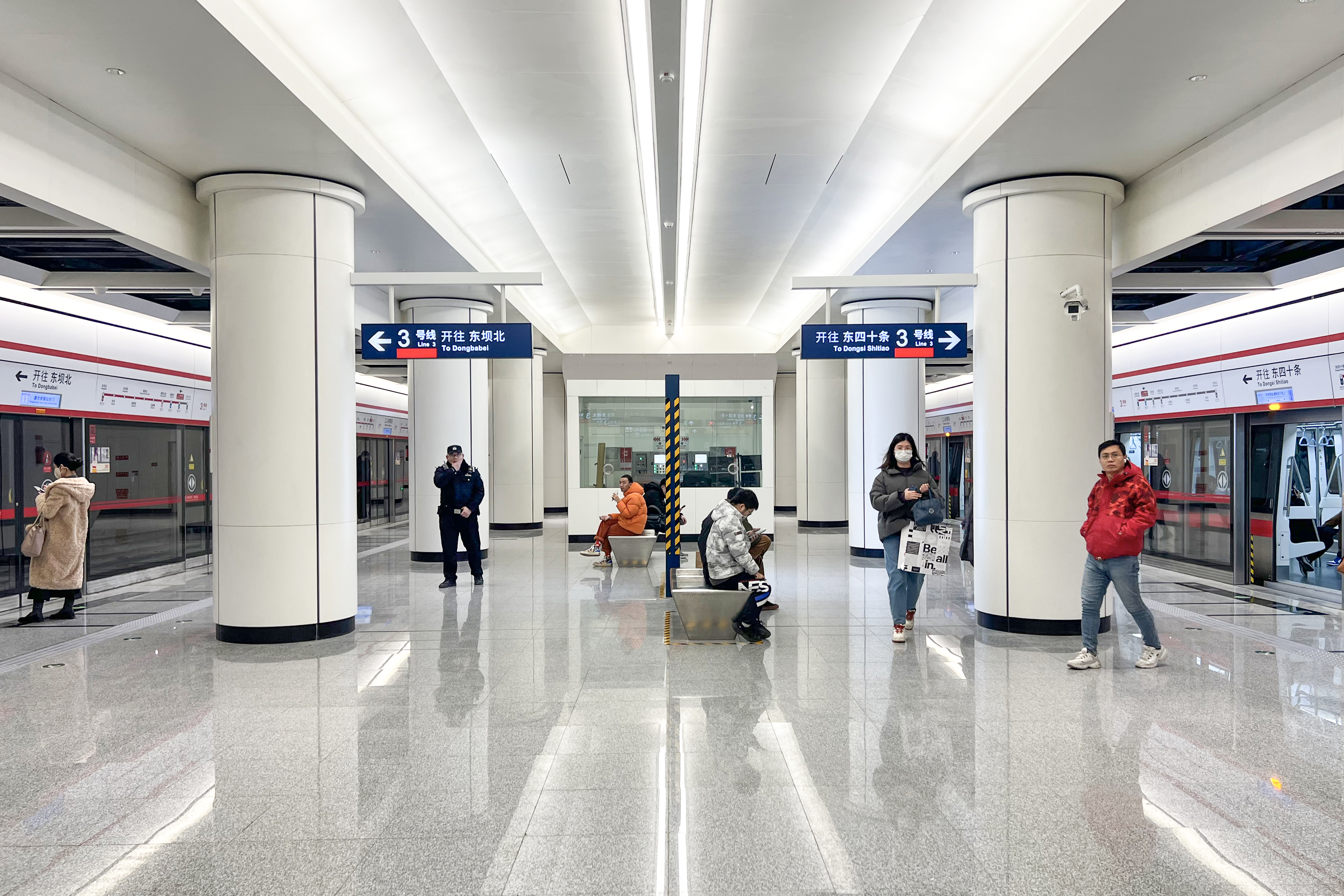
- Line 3 platform

General information
- Location: Interchange of Gongrentiyuchang North Road, Xindong Road (新东路) and Gongrentiyuchang East Road; Sanlitun, Chaoyang, Beijing; China
- Coordinates: 39.932233°N 116.443770°E
- Operator: Beijing Mass Transit Railway Operation Corporation Limited (Line 3); Beijing MTR (Line 17)
- Lines: Line 3; Line 17
- Platforms: 4 (2 island platforms)
- Tracks: 4

Construction
- Structure type: Underground
- Accessible: Yes

History
- Opened: Line 17: December 30, 2023; 2 years ago; Line 3: December 15, 2024; 20 months ago

Services
Preceding station	Beijing Subway	Following station
Dongsi Shitiao Terminus	Line 3	Tuanjiehu towards Dongbabei
Zuojiazhuang towards Weilaikexuechengbei (Future Science City North)	Line 17	Dongdaqiao towards Jiahuihu
Location
- Location within Beijing

Workers' Stadium station (Chinese: 工人体育场站; pinyin: Gōngrén Tǐyùchǎng Zhàn) is an interchange station between Lines 3 and 17 of Beijing Subway. The Line 17 platform opened on December 30, 2023 alongside the opening of Line 17's northern section, and the Line 3 platform opened on December 15, 2024. The Line 17 platform served as the southern terminus of the northern section of the line until the middle section of Line 17 opened on December 27, 2025, connecting it with the southern section at Shilihe.

== History ==
The construction of the station started in November 2018. The station is an interchange station between Line 3 and Line 17. The Line 3 portion and the Line 17 portion were constructed at the same time.

The structure of the station was completed in March 2023, and Line 17 service between this station and Future Science City North commenced on December 30, 2023. Line 3 began serving this station on December 15, 2024.

The Line 17 section between this station and Shilihe opened on December 27, 2025.

== Station layout ==
Both the Line 3 and Line 17 stations have underground island platforms. The two lines share a concourse.

The concourse level for Line 3 features artwork that show pandas playing football, a nod to the nearby Workers' Stadium from which the station derived its name and is the home ground of football club Beijing Guoan. The Line 17 concourse similarly features an art display titled "Dashing and Full of Vitality (英姿勃发)" that shows characters playing football.

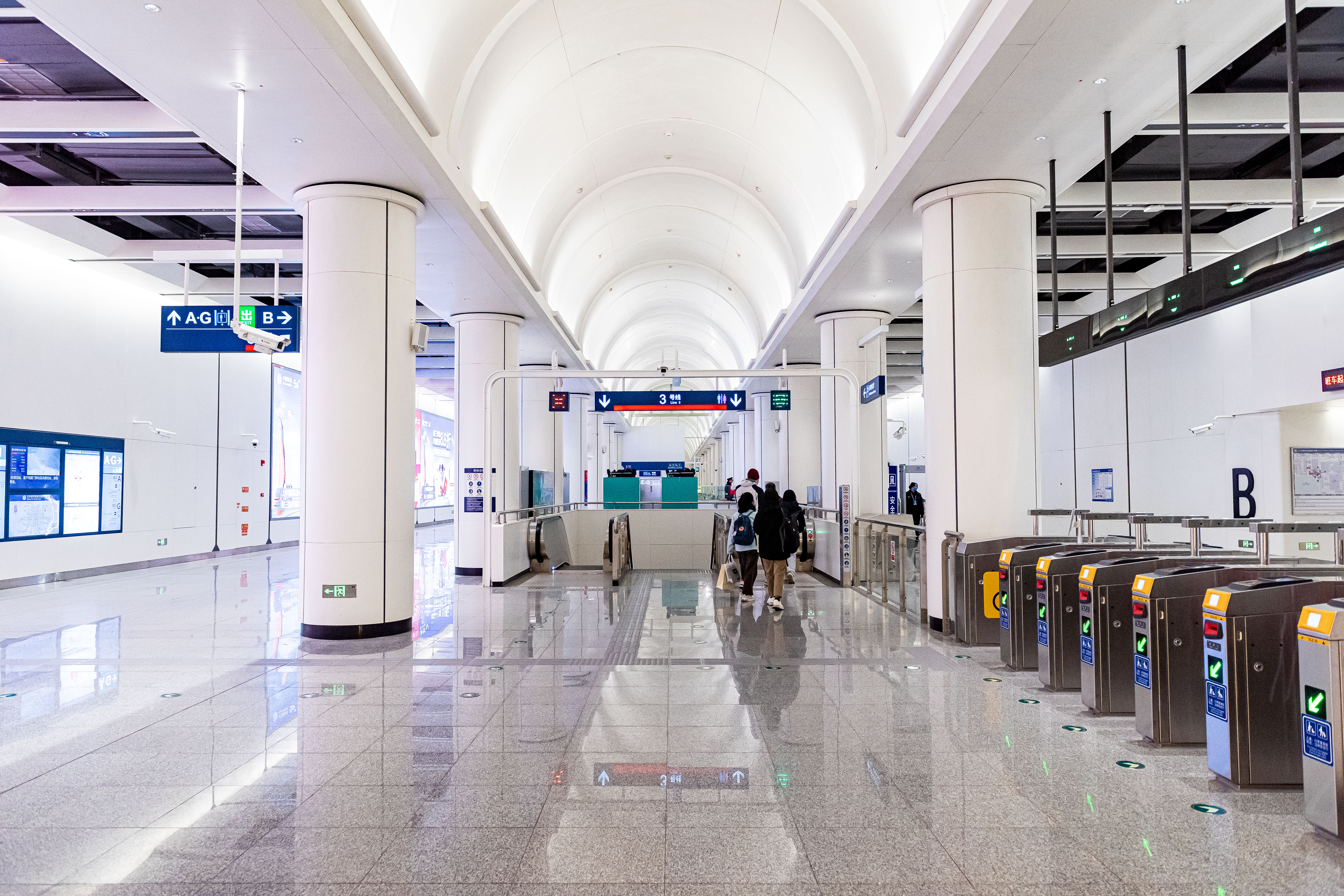
Line 3 concourse

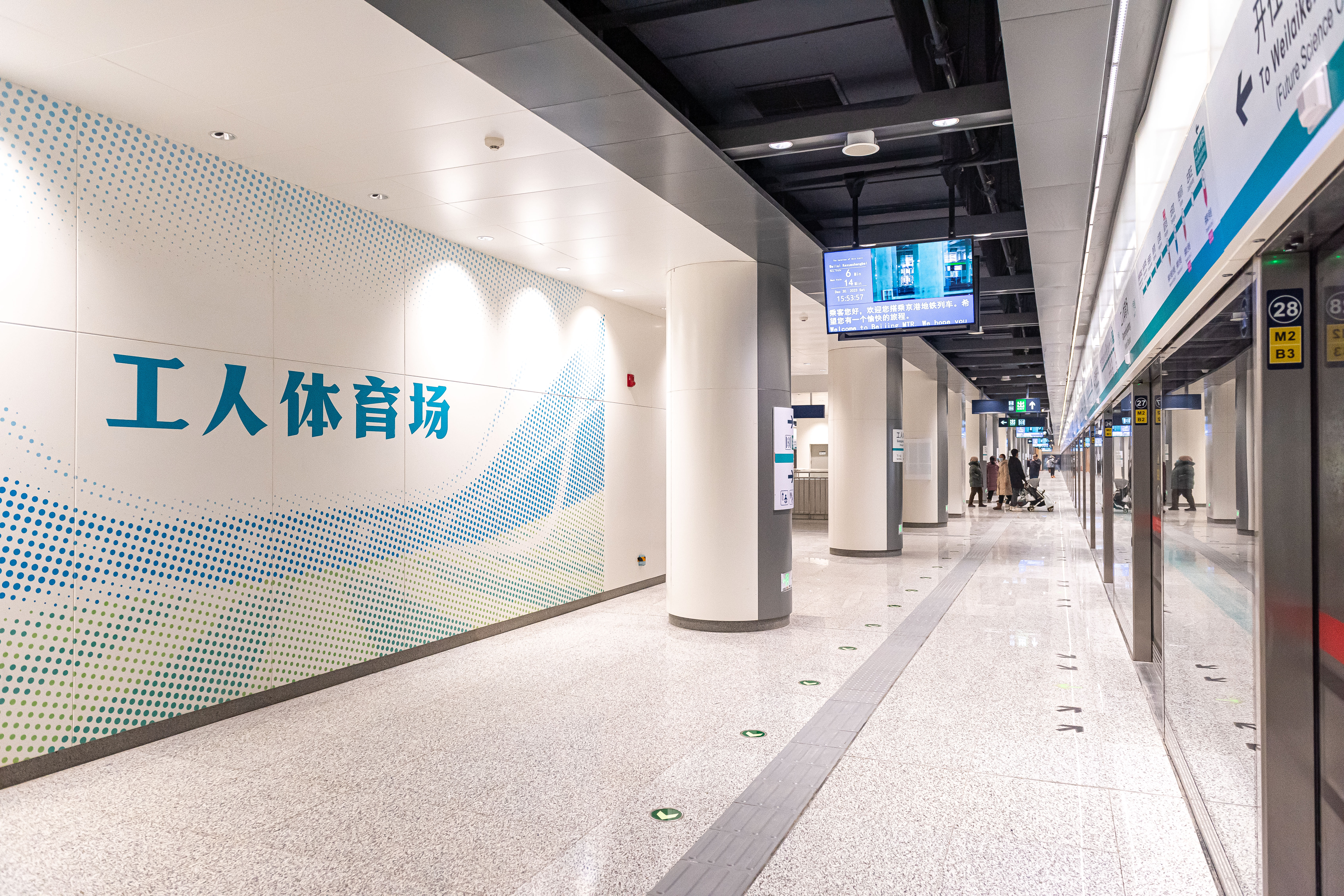
Line 17 platform billboard in December 2023

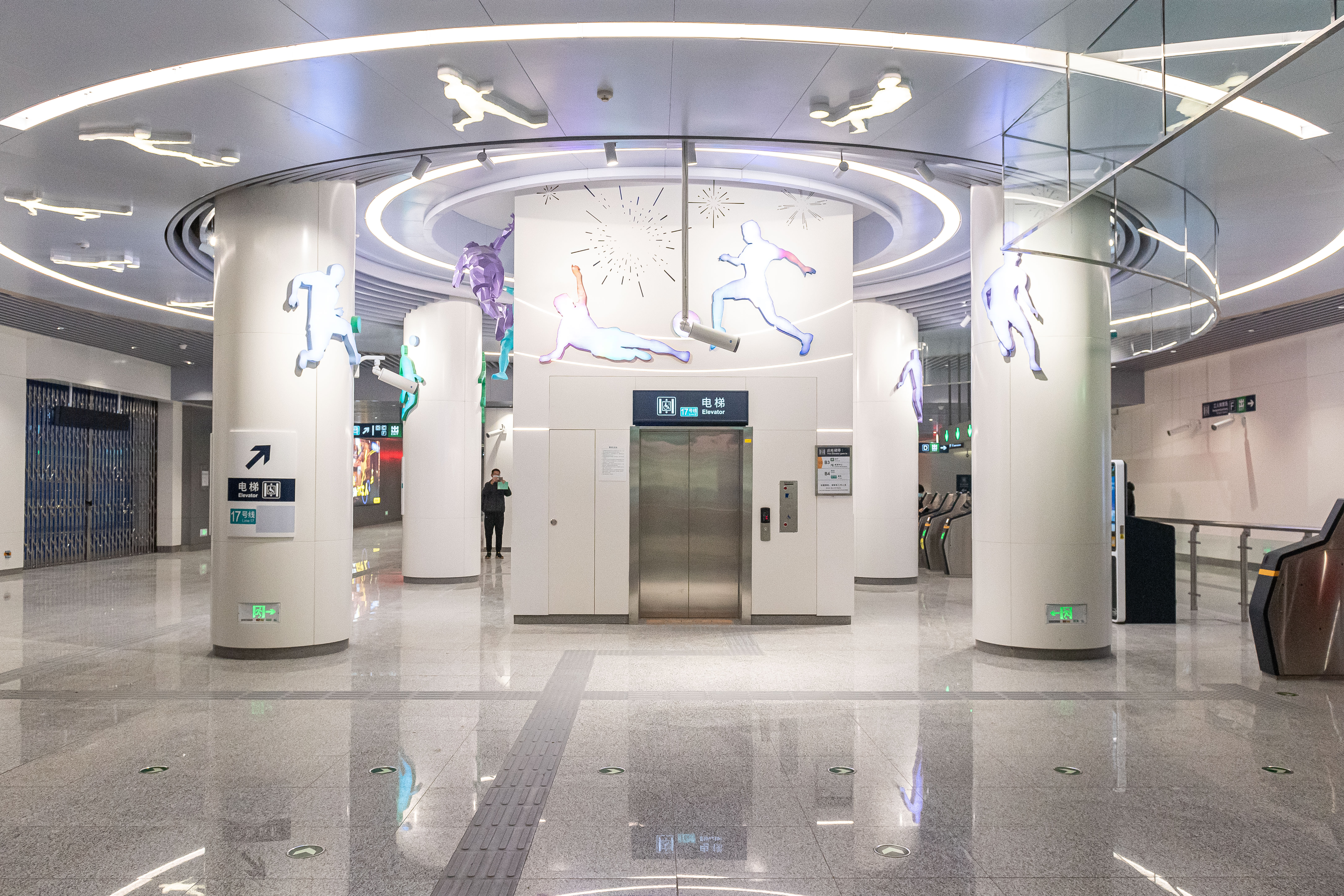
Line 17 concourse, with the Line 3 transfer node on the left

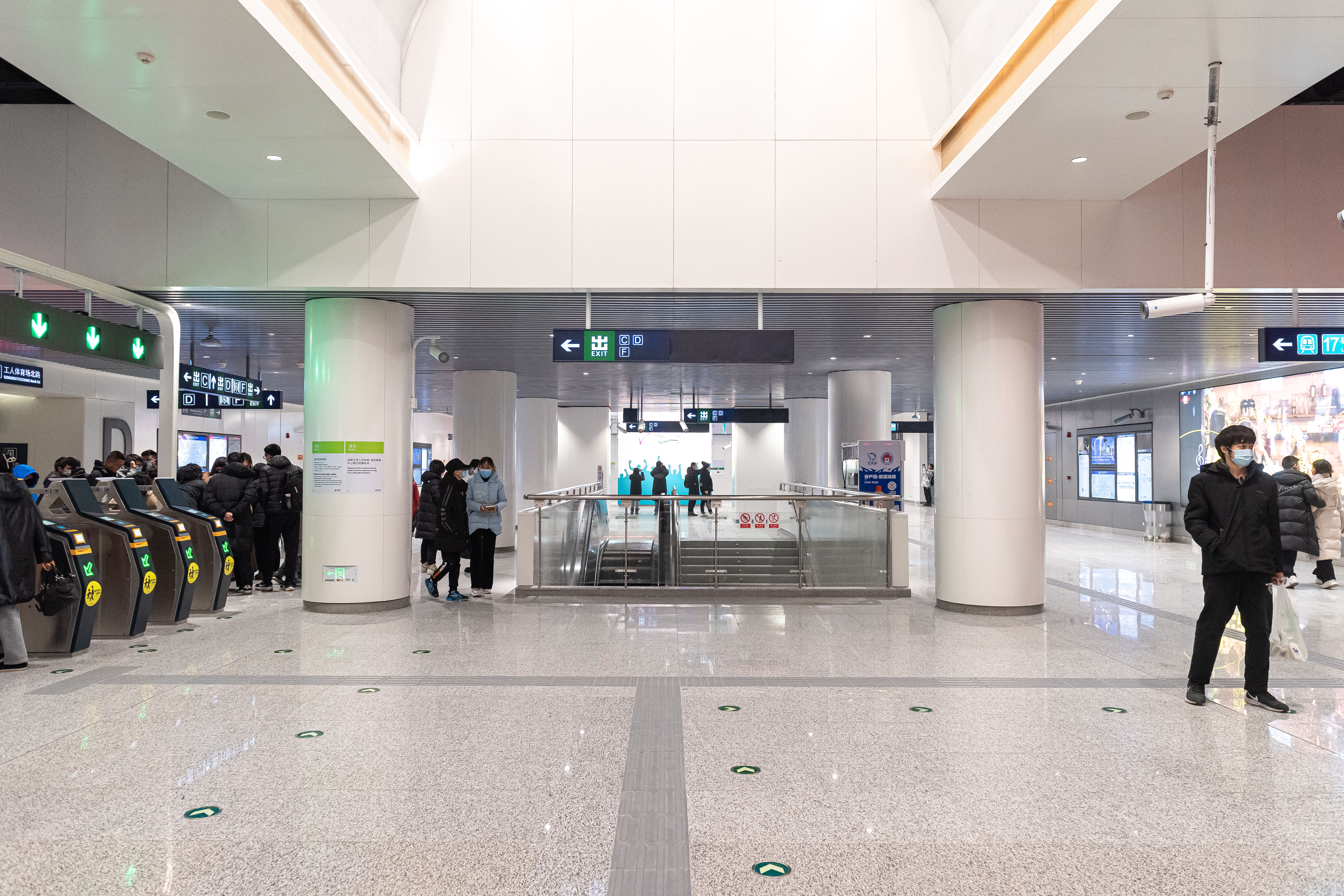
Line 17 concourse

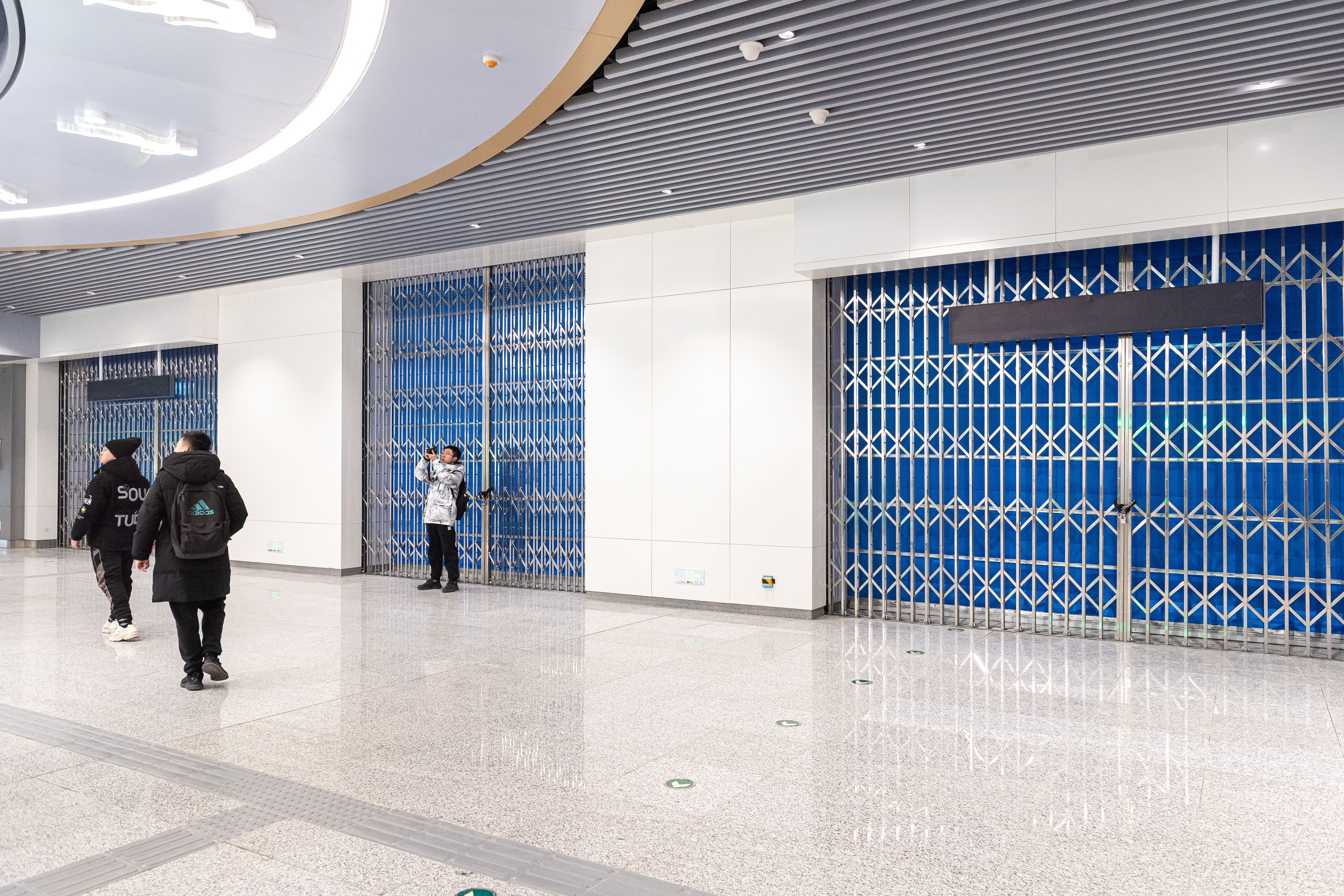
Line 3 transfer node on the west side of the Line 17 concourse

== Exits ==
There are 7 exits, lettered A, B, C, D, F, G and H. Exits C, D and F opened with Line 17, whilst exits A, B, G and H opened with Line 3.

Exit C leads to Xindong Road, D to Gongrentiyuchang North Road and F to Workers' Stadium at Gongrentiyuchang East Road. Exit F has an accessible elevator.

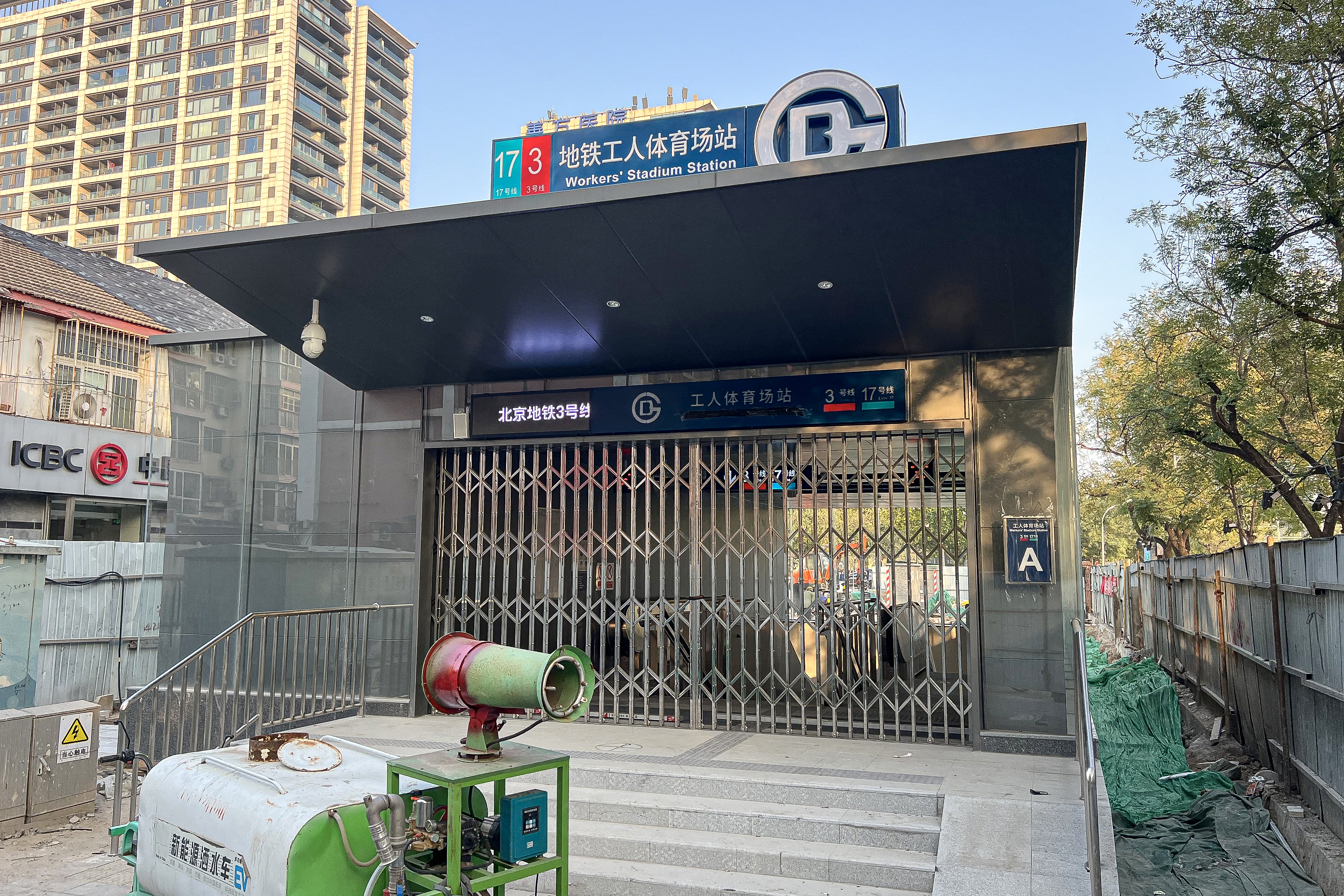
Exit A, Line 3

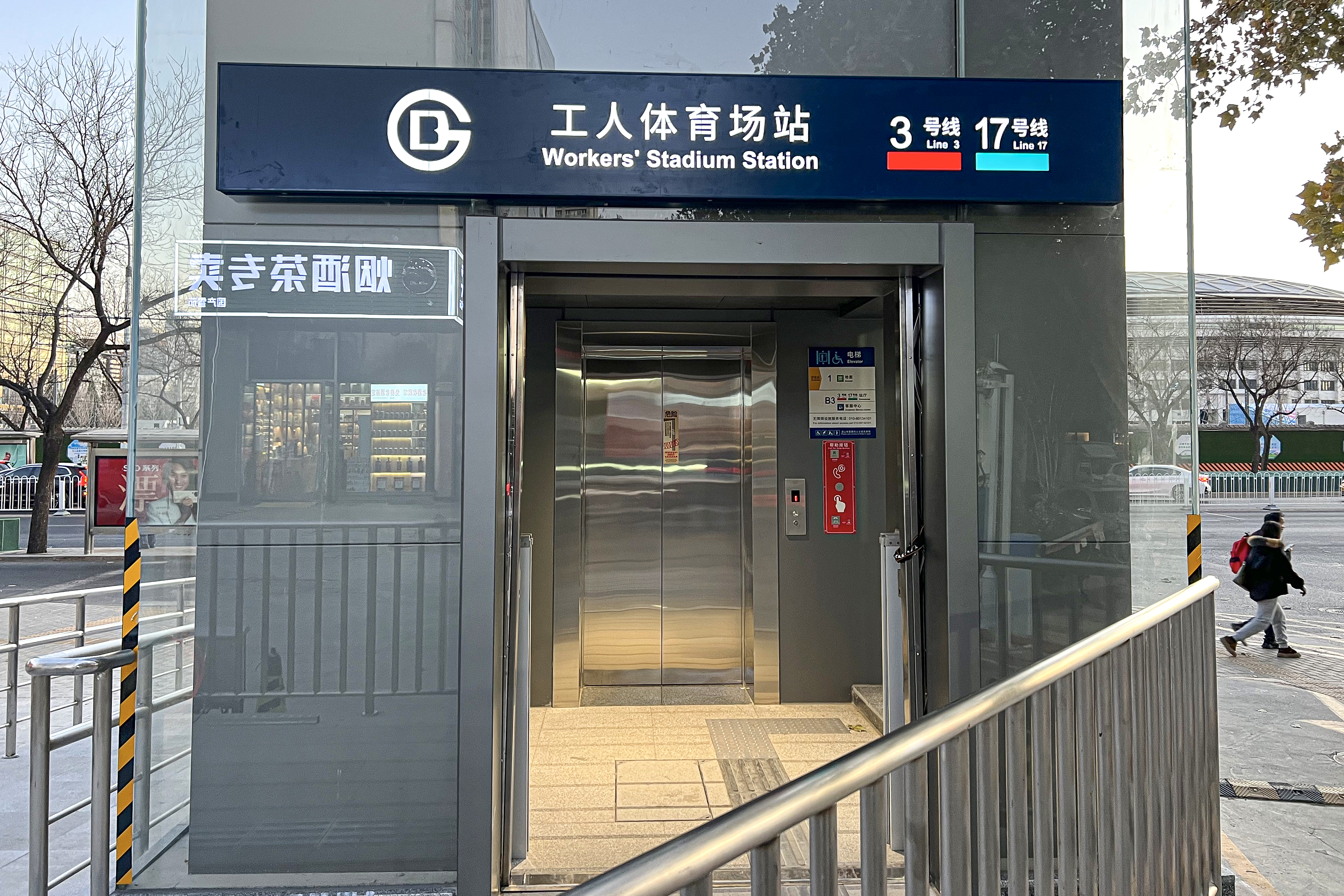
Exit A accessible exit

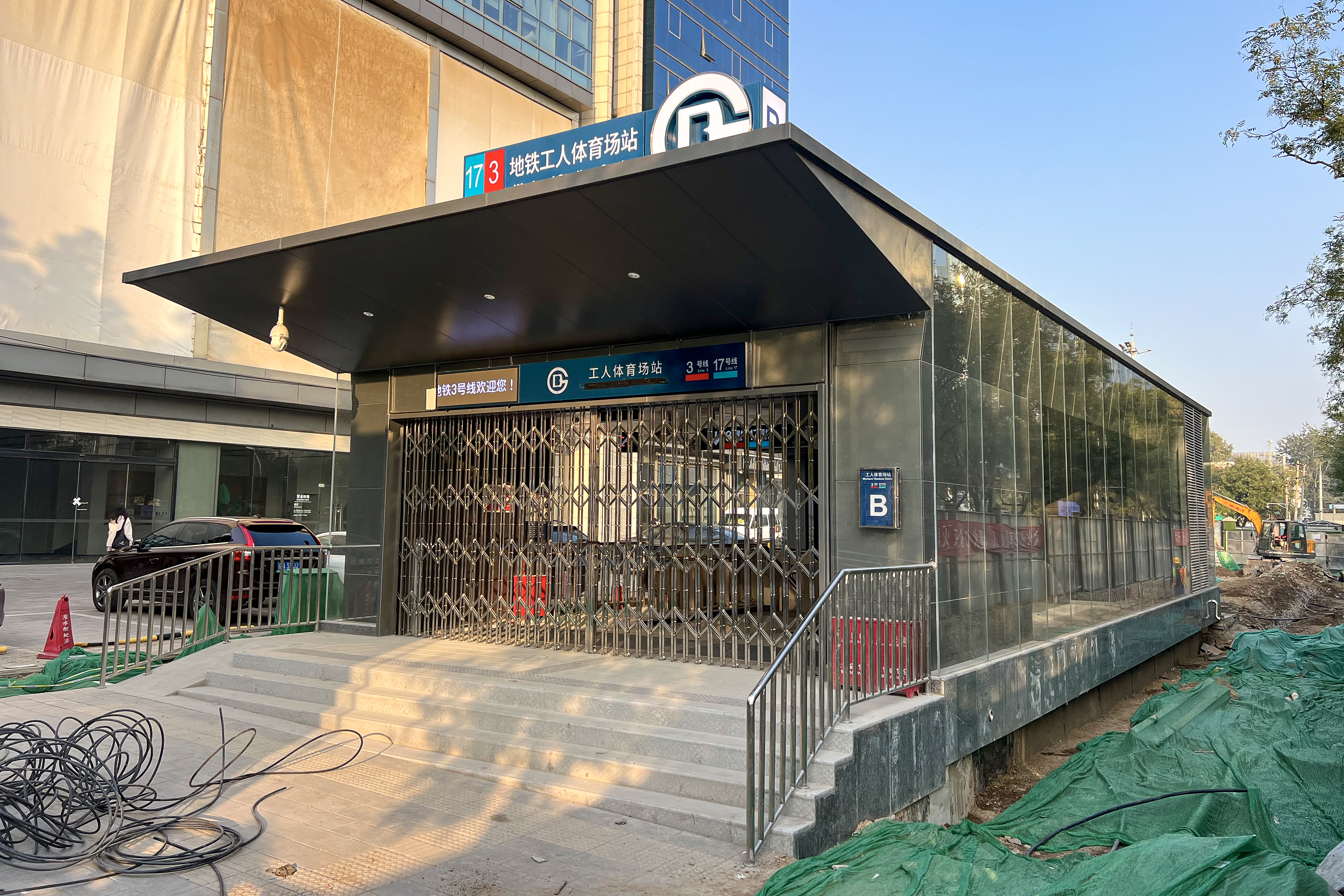
Exit B, Line 3

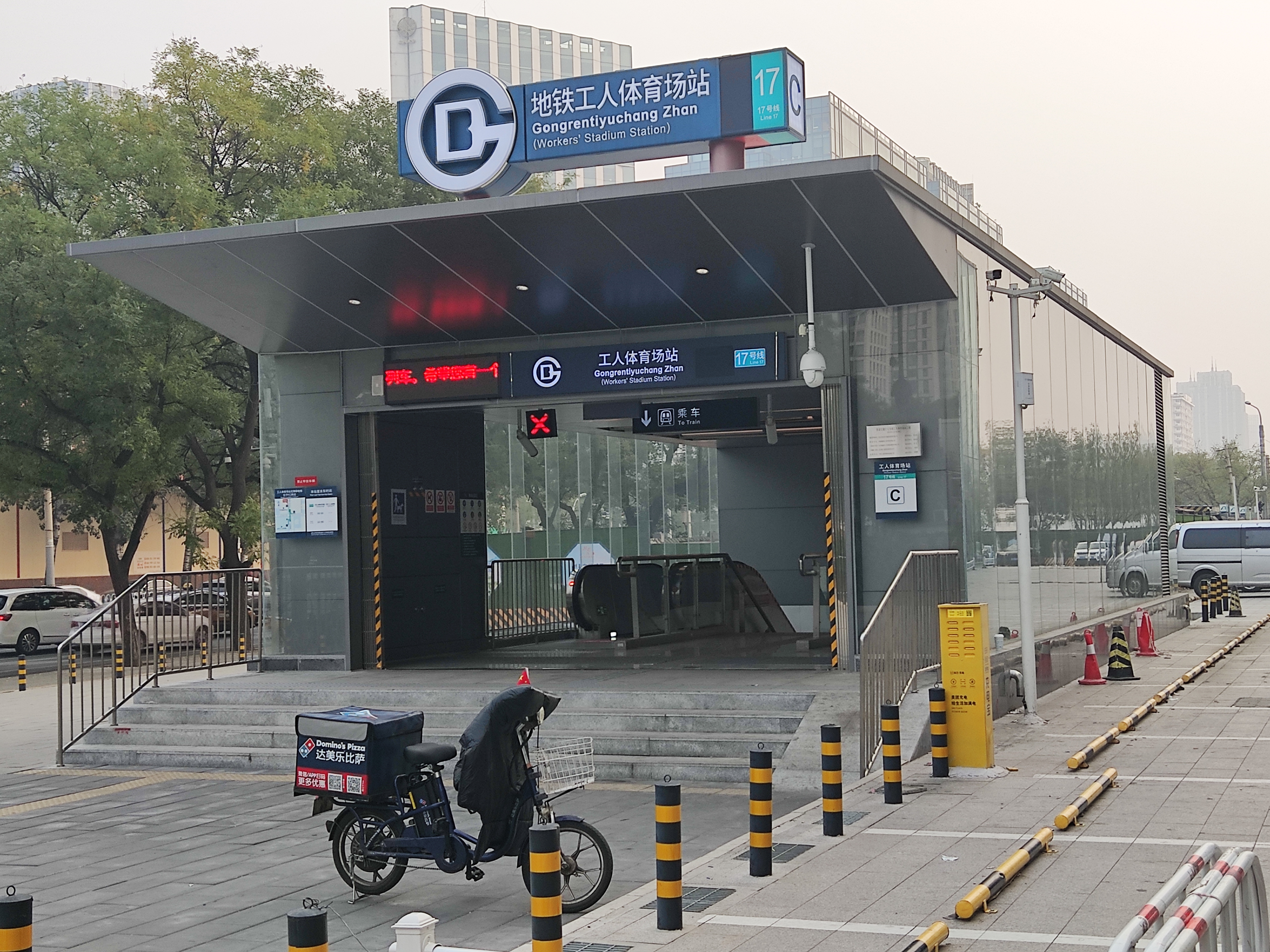
Exit C, Line 17

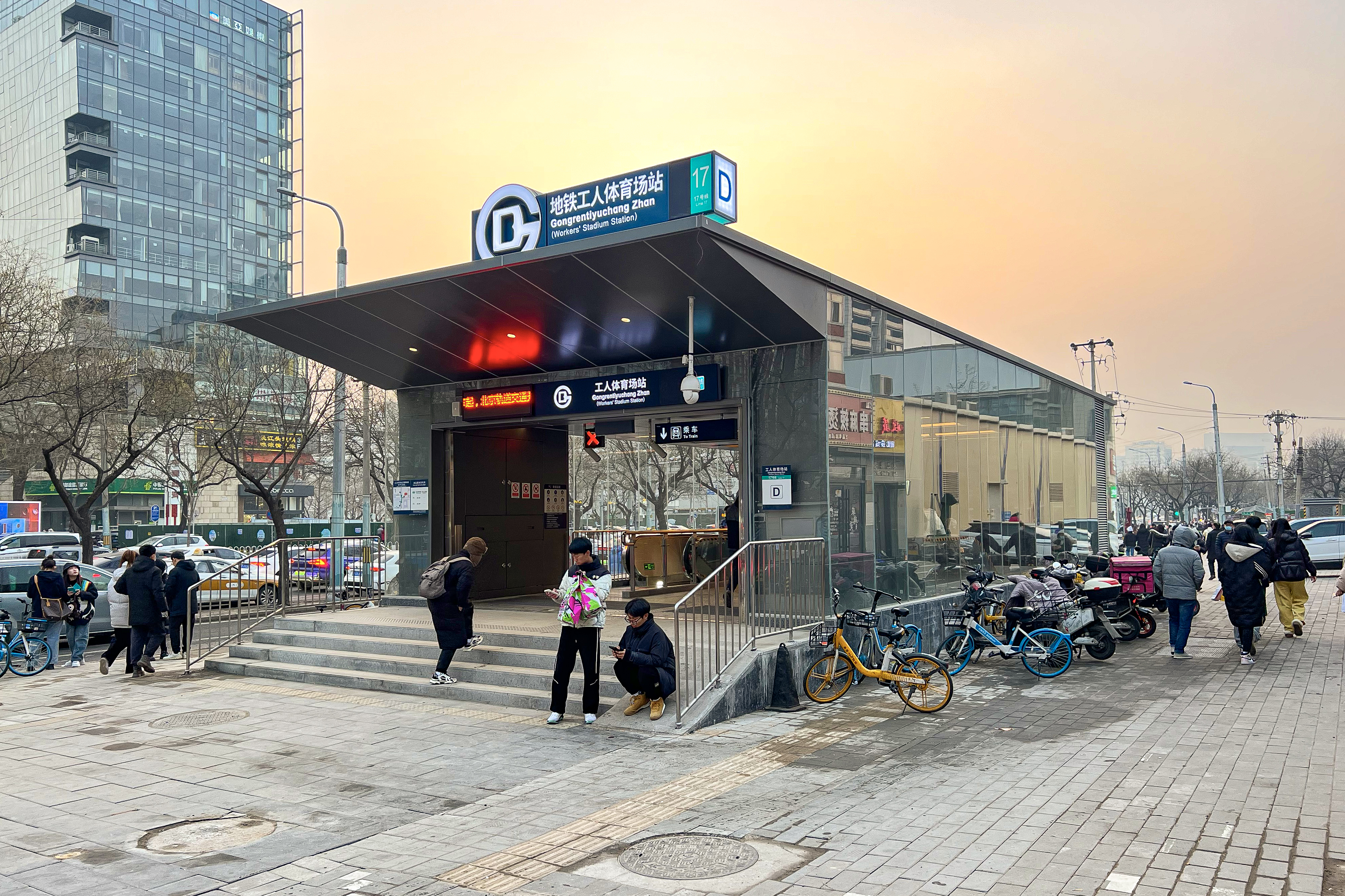
Exit D, Line 17

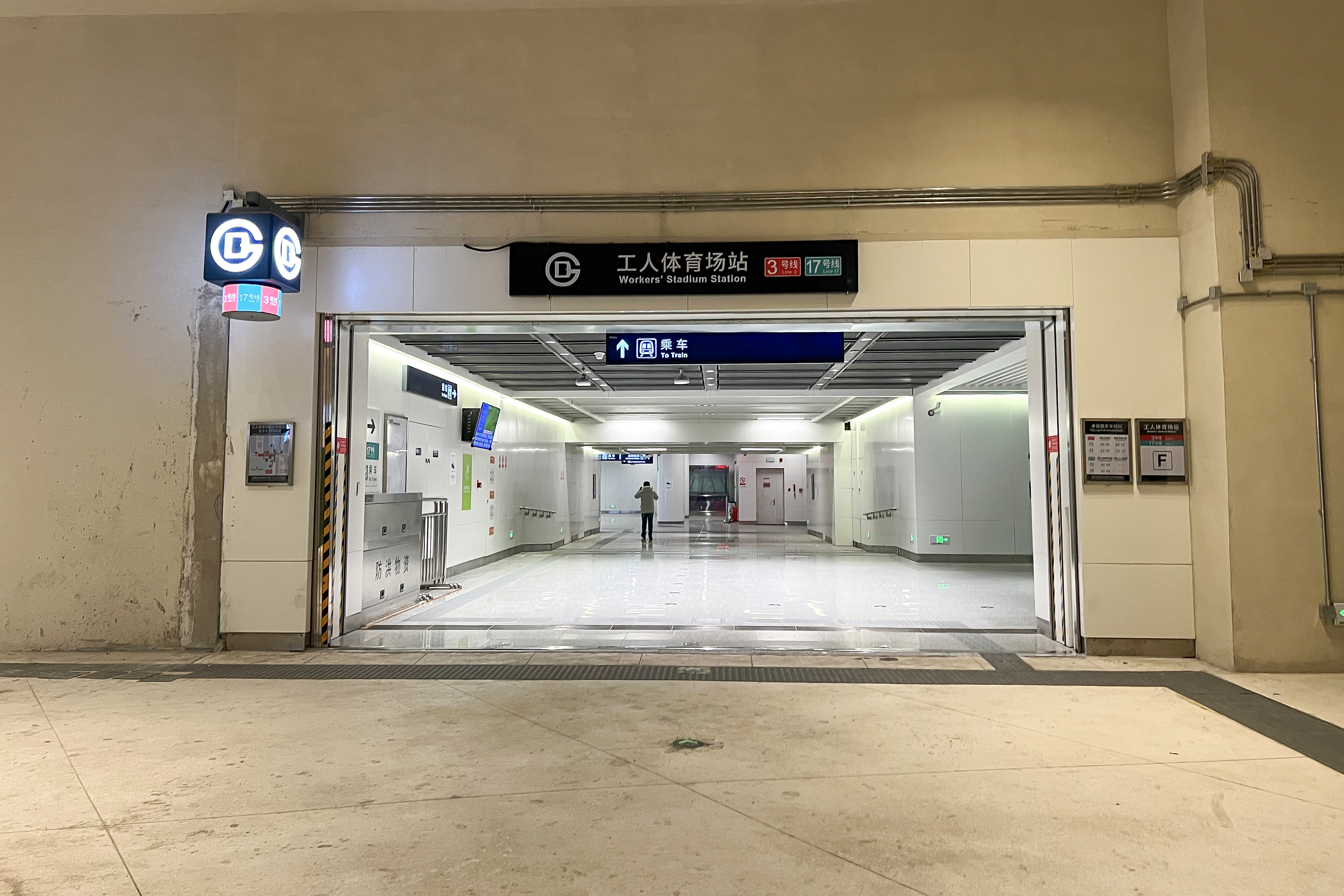
Exit F, Line 17

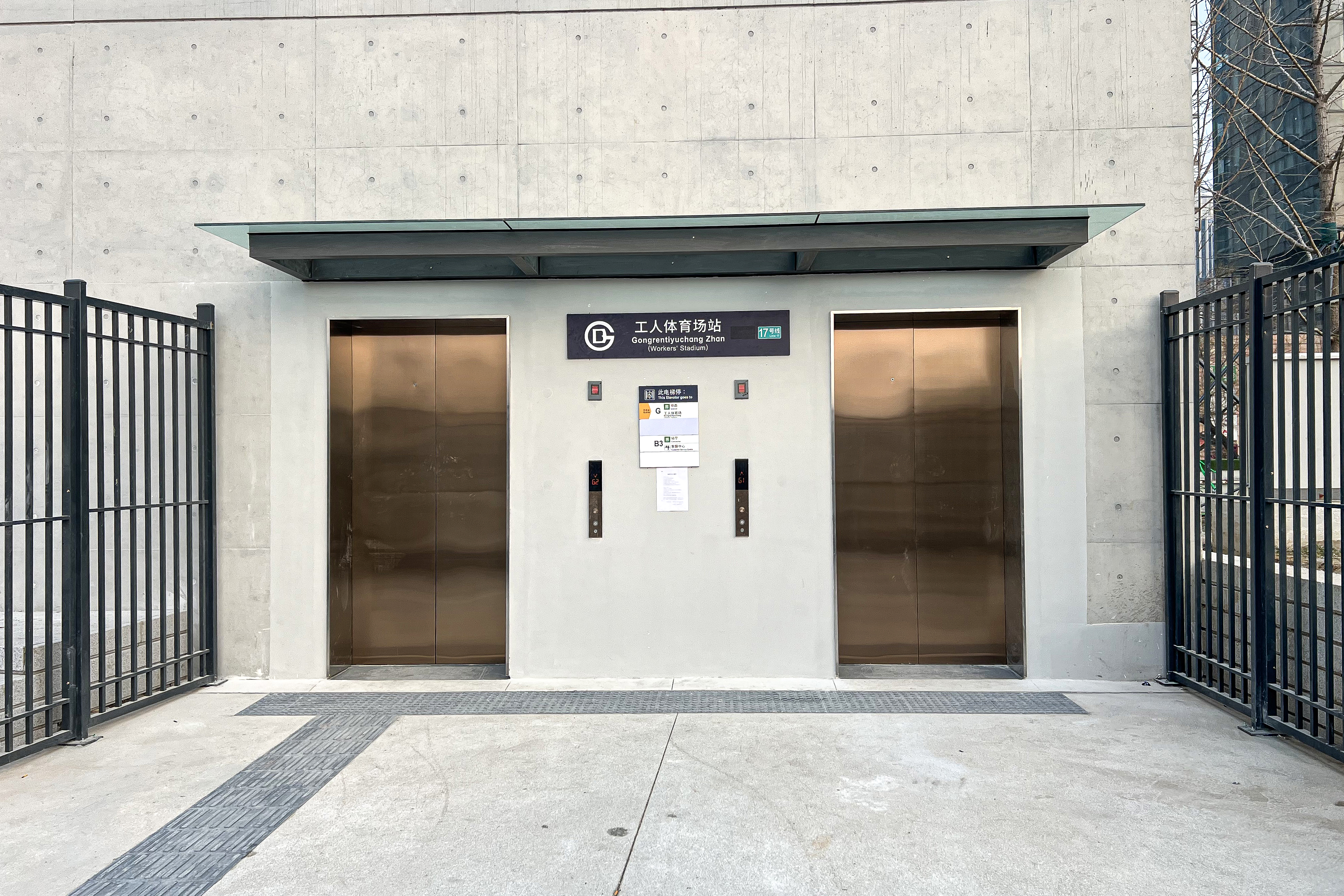
Exit F accessible exit

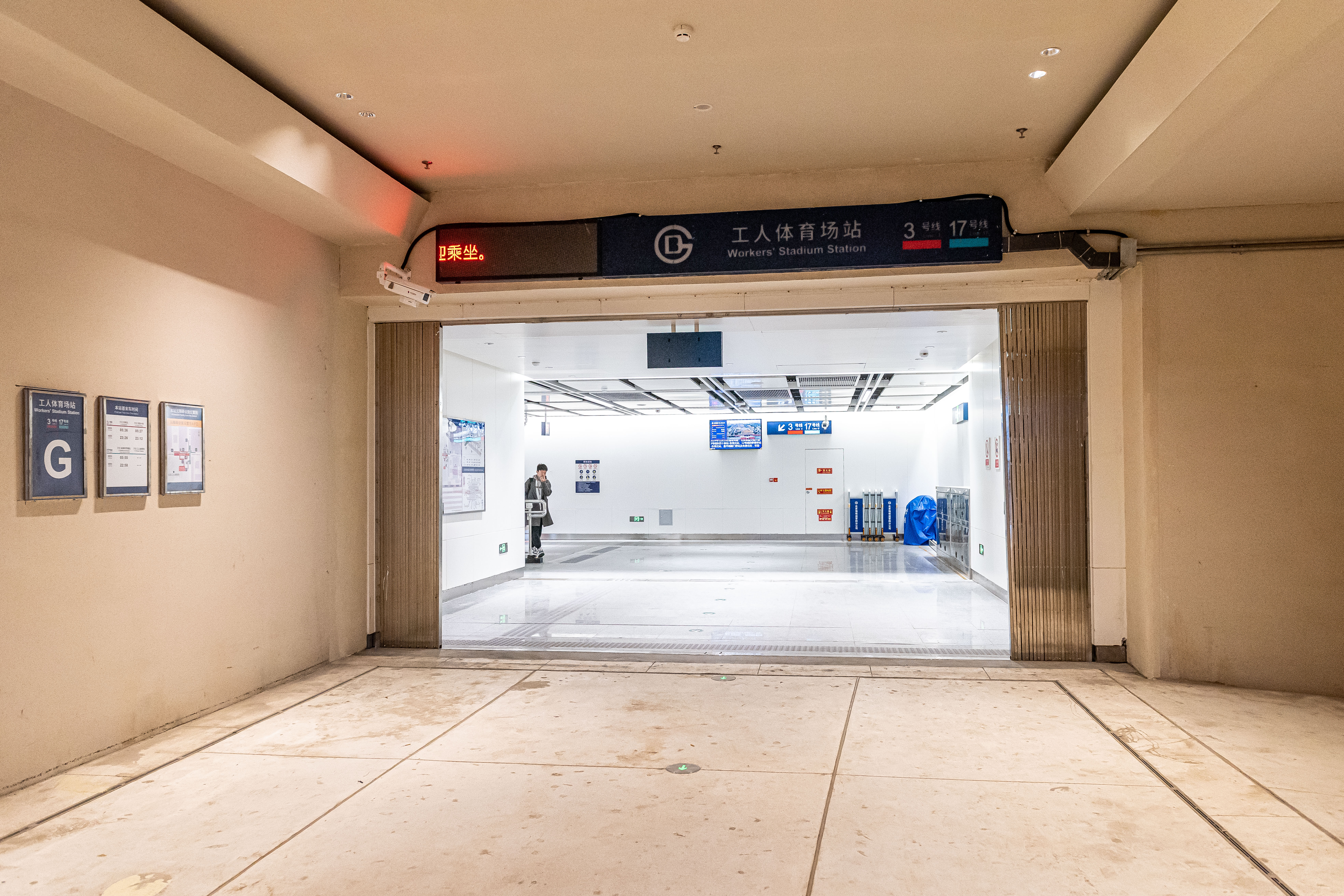
Exit G, Line 3

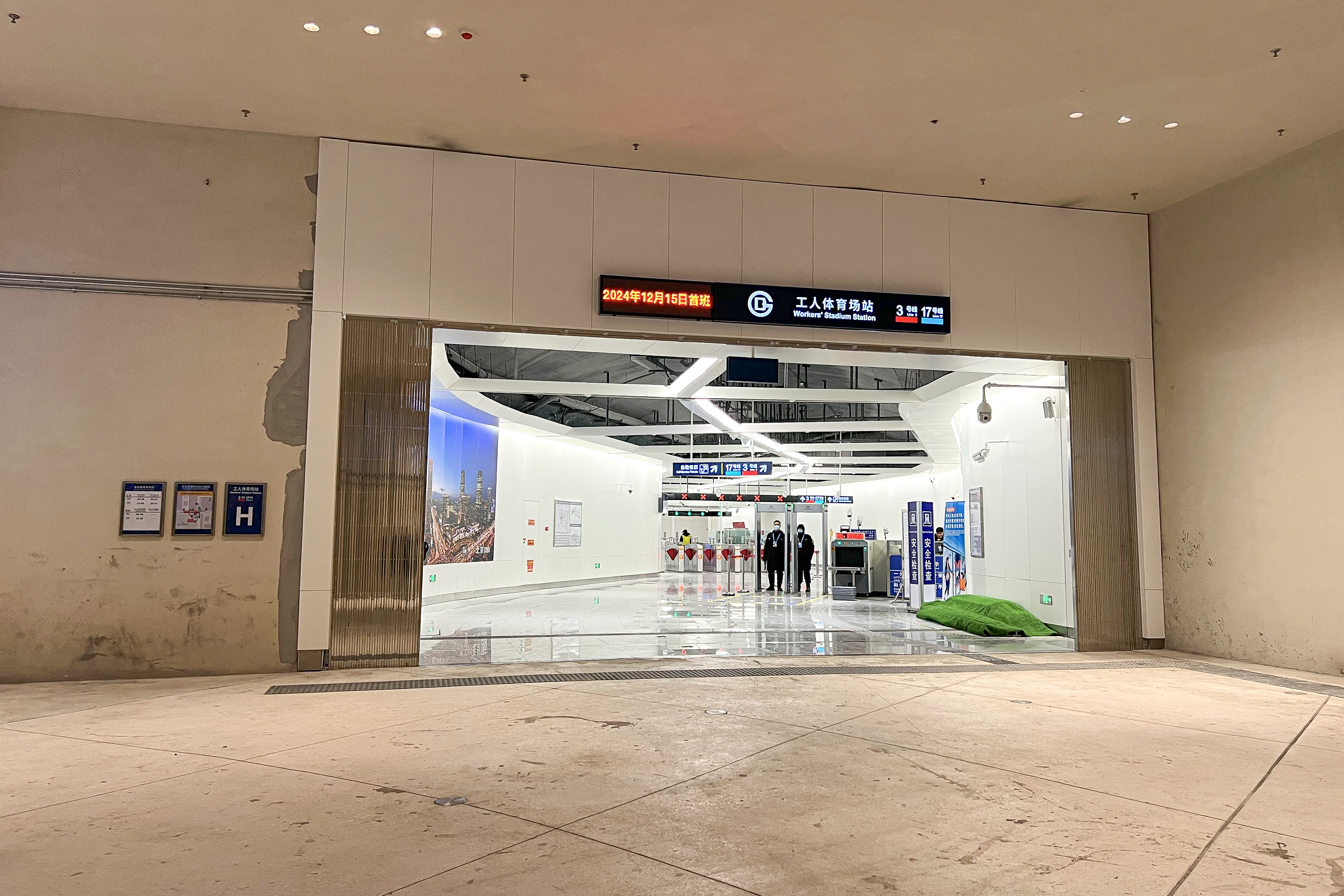
Exit H, Line 3
