= Line 17 (Beijing Subway) =

Subway line in Beijing

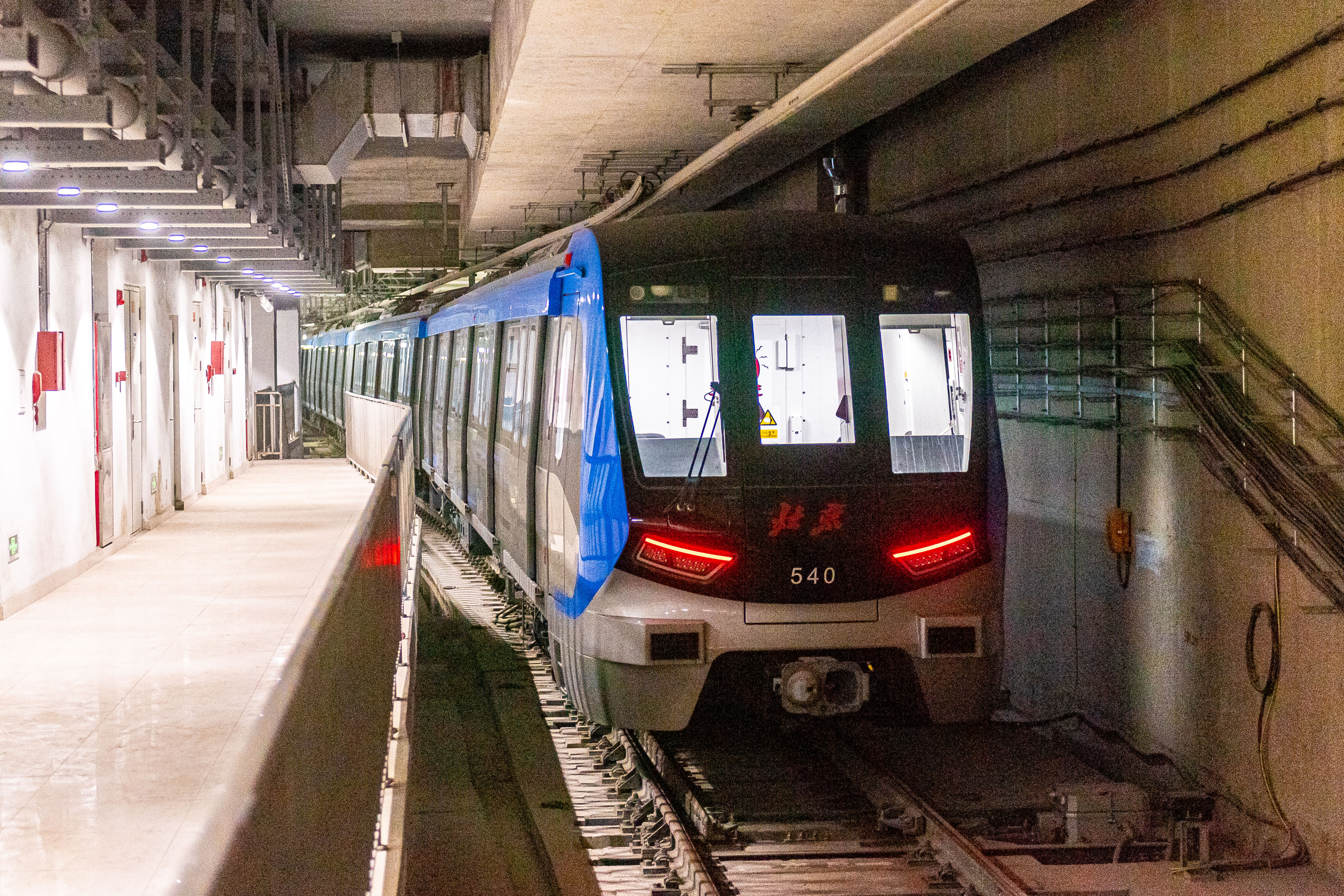
- A CCD5035 train reversing at Jiahuihu station (December 2021)

Overview
- Other name: M17 / R2 (planned name)
- Status: Operational
- Locale: Beijing, China
- Termini: Weilaikexuechengbei (Future Science City North); Jiahuihu
- Stations: 21 (20 in operation)

Service
- Type: Rapid transit
- System: Beijing Subway
- Operator: Beijing MTR Corporation Limited
- Depot(s): Ciqunan and Xiejiacun
- Rolling stock: 8-car Type A
- Daily ridership: 119,000 (2024 Avg.)

History
- Opened: 31 December 2021; 4 years ago (South); 30 December 2023; 2 years ago (North); 27 December 2025; 8 months ago (Middle)

Technical
- Line length: 48.9 km (30.4 mi)
- Character: Underground
- Track gauge: 1,435 mm (4 ft 8 1/2 in)
- Operating speed: 100 km/h (62 mph)

Line 17 of the Beijing Subway (Chinese: 北京地铁17号线; pinyin: běijīng dìtiě shíqī hàoxiàn) is a rapid transit line in Beijing, China. The line is fully underground and has a total length of 48.9 km (30.4 mi). It opened in parts between 2021 and 2025. The line is operated by Beijing MTR Corporation Limited. Line 17's color is turquoise.

The south section of Line 17 opened on 31 December 2021. The north section of Line 17 opened on 30 December 2023 (except Wangjingxi), and the middle section of Line 17 opened on 27 December 2025 (except Guangqumen Wai). Wangjingxi opened on 31 January 2026 with the opening of Wangjing West Transport Hub. Guangqumen Wai will open at later date due to construction of Majuan Transport Hub.

Due to the slow construction progress of the middle section (Workers' Stadium to Shilihe), the line was divided into the northern section (Weilaikexuechengbei (Future Science City North) to Workers' Stadium) and the southern section (Shilihe to Jiahuihu) from 2023 to 2025, until the middle section was put into operation in December 2025, completing the line.

== Description ==
Line 17 is runs from the Weilaikexuechengbei (Future Science City North) station in Changping District to Jiahuihu station in Tongzhou District. The line is fully underground and has a total length of 48.9 km (30.4 mi). The expected end-to-end travel time is 66 minutes. The line will help alleviate congestion on Line 5, Line 10 and Line 13.

== Rolling stock ==
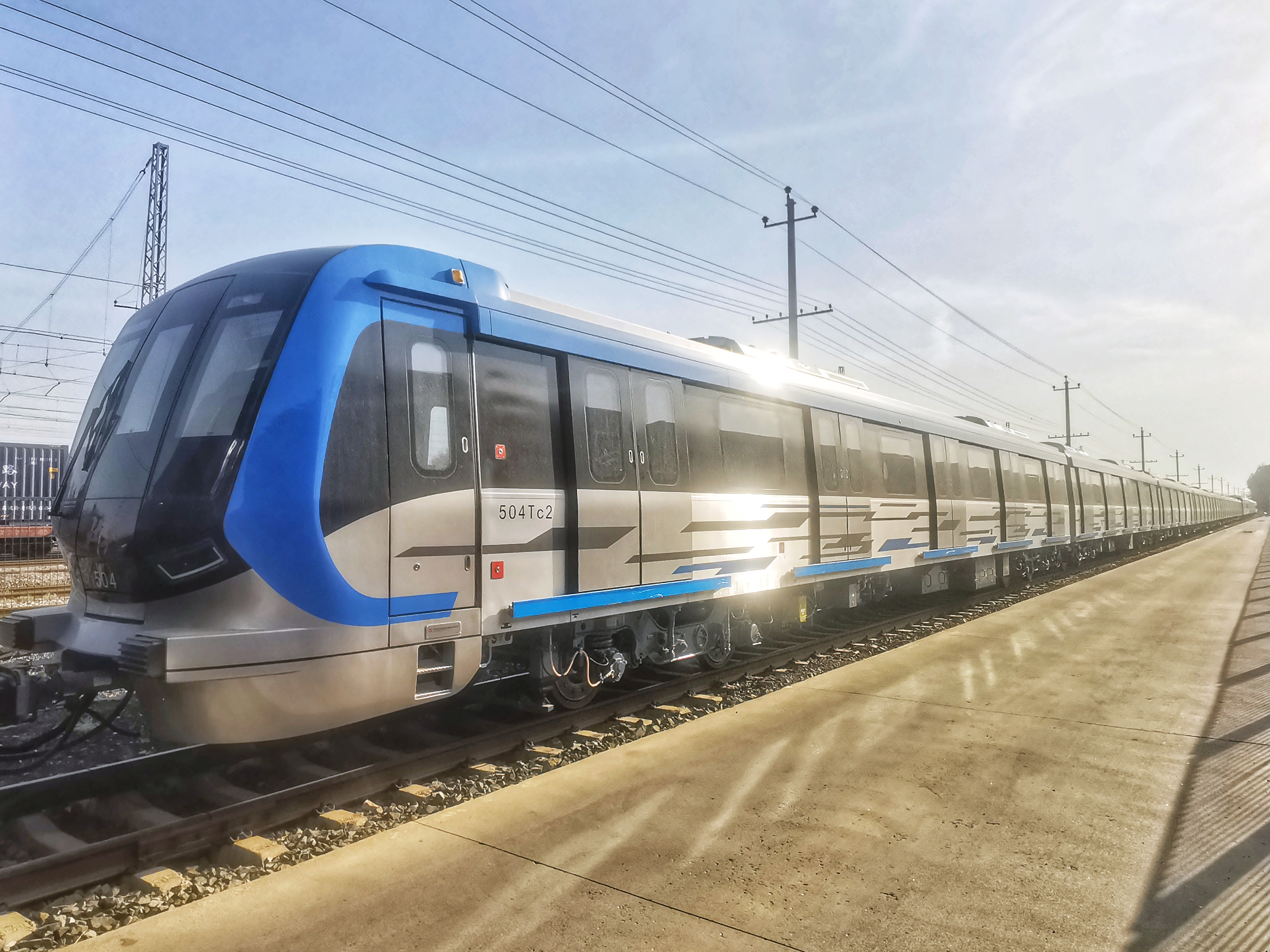
Line 17 train delivered to Dahongmen railway station in May 2021

Line 17 uses 8-car Type A rolling stock.

== Opening timeline ==
| Segment | Commencement | Length | Station(s) | Name |
|---|---|---|---|---|
| Shilihe — Jiahuihu | 31 December 2021 | 15.8 km (9.8 mi) | 7 | Southern section |
| Future Science City North — Workers' Stadium | 30 December 2023 | 24.9 km (15.5 mi) | 9 | Northern section |
| Workers' Stadium — Shilihe | 27 December 2025 | 8.2 km (5.1 mi) | 3 | Middle section |
| Wangjingxi | 31 January 2026 | Infill stations | 1 | Northern section |
| Guangqumen Wai | To be determined | Infill stations | 1 | Middle section |

== Stations ==
| Station Name | | Connections | Nearby Bus Stops | Distance km | | Location |
| English | Chinese | Connections | Nearby Bus Stops | Distance km | | Location |
|---|---|---|---|---|---|---|
| Weilaikexuechengbei (Future Science City North) | 未来科学城北 | | 487 923 昌27 昌60 昌63 顺66 顺75 | 0.000 | 0.000 | Changping |
| Weilaikexuecheng (Future Science City) | 未来科学城 | | 417 923 昌38 昌39 昌63 快速直达专线8 专42 | 1.724 | 1.724 | Changping |
| Tiantongyuandong | 天通苑东 | 18 | 301 386 432 530 596 628 夜26 专58 专119 | 5.848 | 7.572 | Changping |
| Qingheying | 清河营 | | 386 596 专81 | 1.935 | 9.507 | Chaoyang |
| Hongjunying | 红军营 | | 386 415 621 966 | 1.923 | 11.430 | Chaoyang |
| Wangjingxi | 望京西 | 13 15 | 450 538 547 571 851 854 866 907 928 987 快速直达专线197 专112 | 5.022 | 16.452 | Chaoyang |
| Taiyanggong | 太阳宫 | 10 | 130 132 467 515 567 939 专212 | 2.500 | 18.952 | Chaoyang |
| Xibahe | 西坝河 | 12 | 95 130 132 300 300快 302 368 379 467 515 596 604 641 671 916快 942 980快 快速直达专线195 快速直达专线196 夜30 | 1.207 | 20.159 | Chaoyang |
| Zuojiazhuang | 左家庄 | | 3 18 24 110 120 123 132 359 379 401 404 515 536 675 850 850快 915 916 916快 918 935 935快 942 980快 夜24 专26 | 2.411 | 22.570 | Chaoyang |
| Workers' Stadium | 工人体育场 | 3 | 3 4 39 110 113 115 117 118 120 403 406 431 夜3 夜24 夜34 | 2.324 | 24.894 | Chaoyang |
| Dongdaqiao | 东大桥 | 6 | 28 39 75 98 101 109 110 118 120 126 139 350 403 412 515 615 BRT2(快速公交2) 夜13 夜24 专5 专114 | 1.169 | 26.063 | Chaoyang |
| Yong'an Li | 永安里 | 1 | 1 1区 9 28 39 58 120 126 140 403 639 668 夜1 夜24 | 1.467 | 27.530 | Chaoyang |
| Guangqumen Wai | 广渠门外 | 7 | | — | — | Dongcheng |
| Panjiayuanxi | 潘家园西 | | 34 36 51 440 专19 | 3.909 | 31.439 | Chaoyang |
| Shilihe | 十里河 | 10 14 | 28 53 300 300快 352 368 378 439 440 513 638 649 680 687 846 848 973 975 976 985 986 995 快速直达专线217 夜30 专19 | 1.677 | 33.116 | Chaoyang |
| Zhoujiazhuang | 周家庄 | | 378 638 976 986 | 1.672 | 34.788 | Chaoyang |
| Shibalidian | 十八里店 | | 专217 | 2.349 | 37.137 | Chaoyang |
| Beishenshu | 北神树 | | 440 637 820 986 专182 专187 | 5.840 | 42.977 | Tongzhou |
| Ciqubei | 次渠北 | | 913 T12 T68 T68区 专232 | 2.334 | 45.311 | Tongzhou |
| Ciqu | 次渠 | Yizhuang | 637 820 986 T11 T27 T56 T87 专159 专207 | 1.455 | 46.766 | Tongzhou |
| Jiahuihu | 嘉会湖 | | 专160 专207 | 2.125 | 48.891 | Tongzhou |

== History ==
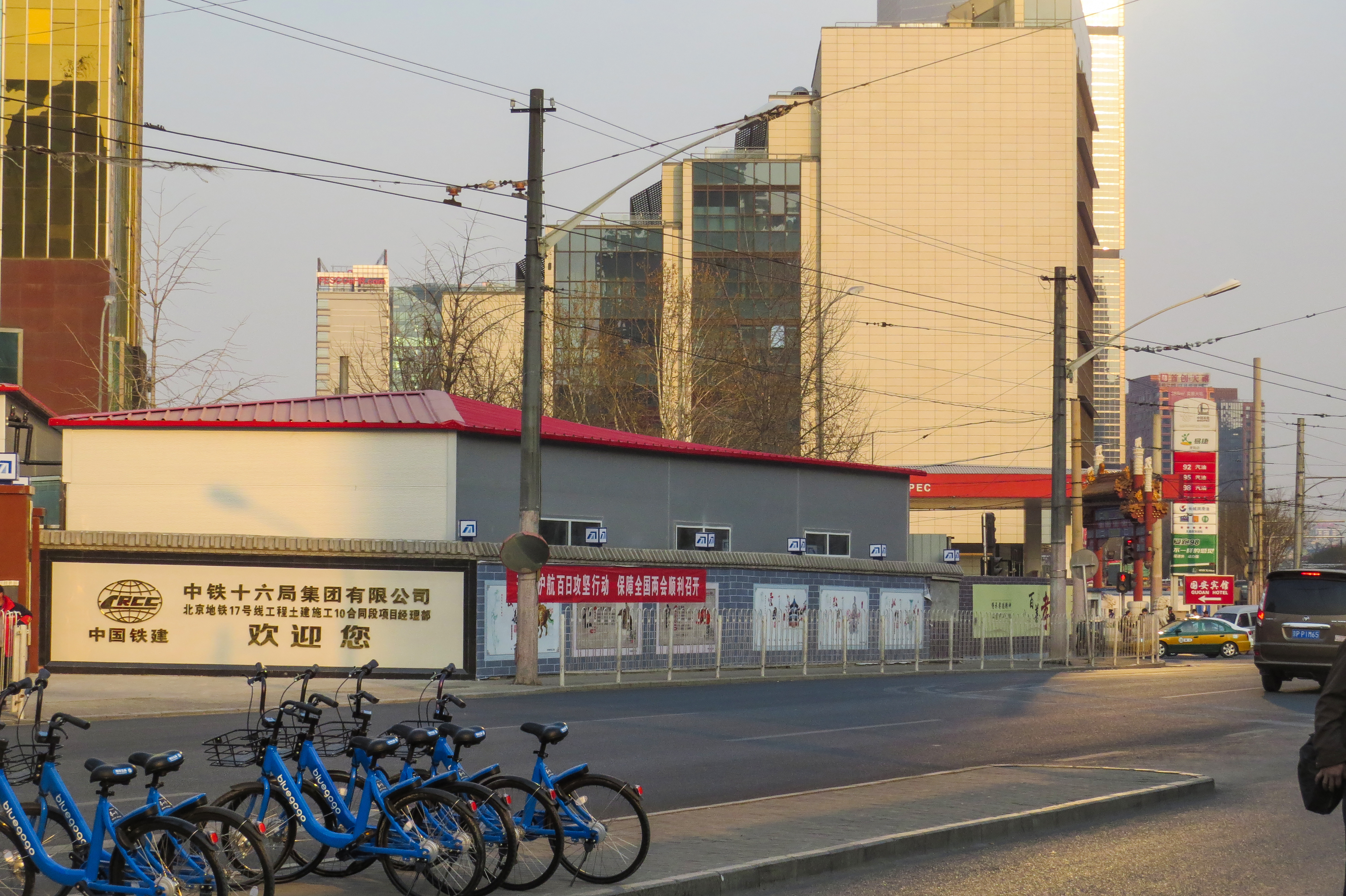
Project headquarters of Line 17 Dongdaqiao station in March 2017.

In January 2011, an official with the city's planning committee indicated that Line 17 of the subway was planned to run east–west through the city's Central Business District under Guanghua Road with transfers to Lines 4 and 5. However, the line run through Central Business District is known as Line 28 now.

In February 2012, the city's planning committee identified a different Line 17, as a line planned for 2020, that would run north–south from Tiantongyuan to Yizhuang that would run parallel and to the east of Line 5. On 15 June 2012, the city government disclosed tentatively planned stations for the line.

On 10 October 2013, city authorities confirmed that Line 17 would run from the Future Science Park North station in Changping District to Yizhuang Zhanqianqu South station in Tongzhou District. Construction was expected to begin in 2014 and Line 17 would have a total length of 48.9 km (30.4 mi).

Construction of the line began in 2015.

In December 2019, Beijing MTR was awarded the Line 17 Operations & Maintenance (O&M) Concession. BJMTR signed the O&M Agreement (with Rolling Stocks Lease) of Beijing Subway Line 17 Project with Beijing Subway Line 17 Investment Co., Ltd.

On 8 July 2022, an EIA document prepared by the China Academy of Railway Sciences (CARS) regarding Phase III (2022–2027) construction of the Beijing Subway announced an 8.9 km (5.5 mi) branch line of Line 17 from Tiantongyuandong Station to Beiqijia, with one intermediate station not identified.

In February 2024, Beijing Infrastructure Investment (BII) announced several tender announcements and modified the number of new stations of branch-styled phase 2 of Line 17 to 3 new stations.
