= Jiahuihu station =

Beijing Subway Line 17 station

Jiahuihu 嘉会湖
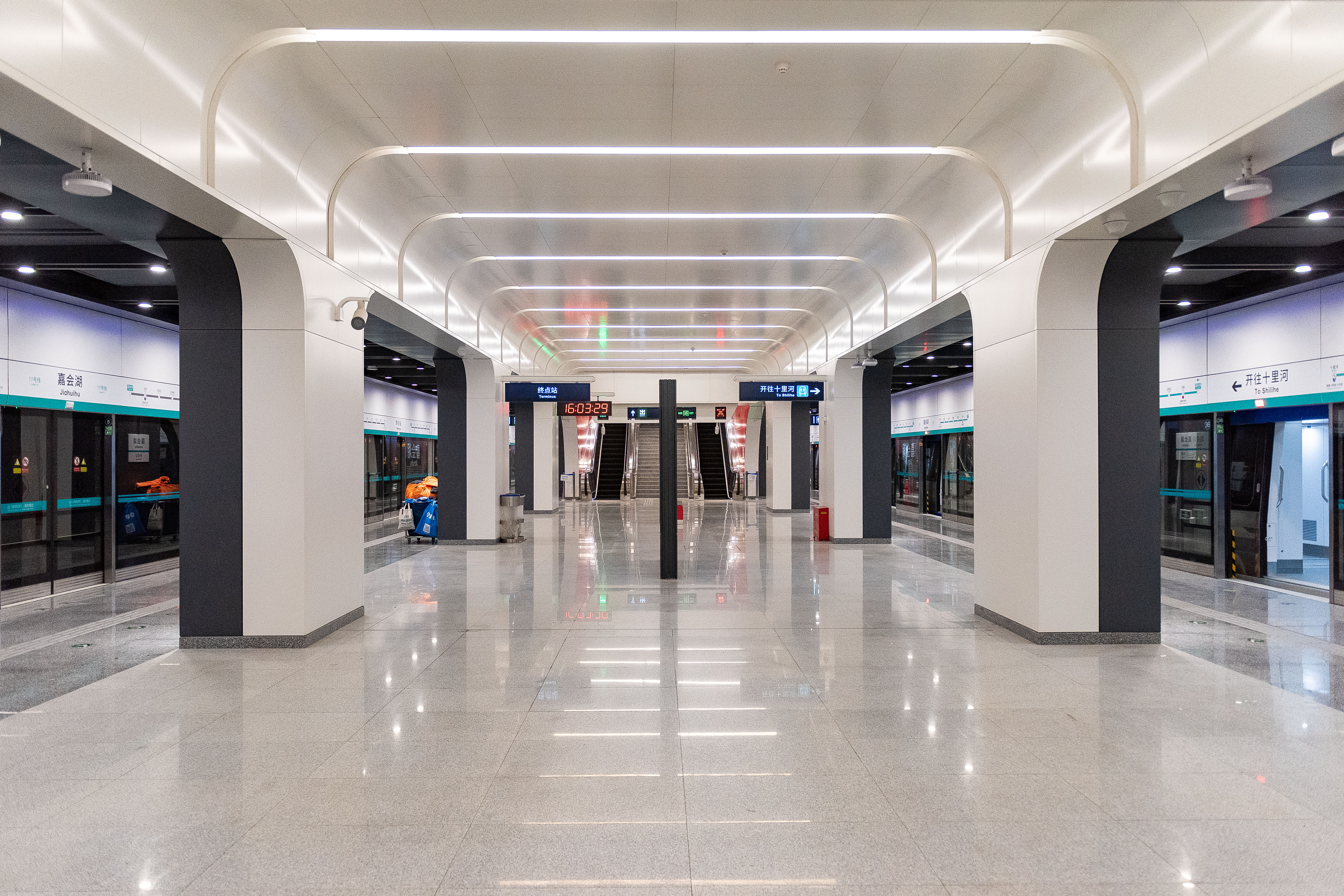
- Platform

General information
- Location: Intersection of Maizhuang Village (麦庄村) and Xitaipingzhuang Village (西太平庄村); Taihu, Tongzhou District, Beijing; China
- Coordinates: 39°47′29″N 116°36′16″E
- Operator: Beijing MTR
- Line: Line 17
- Platforms: 2 (1 island platform)
- Tracks: 2

Construction
- Structure type: Underground
- Accessible: Yes

History
- Opened: December 31, 2021; 4 years ago

Services
Preceding station	Beijing Subway	Following station
Ciqu towards Weilaikexuechengbei (Future Science City North)	Line 17	Terminus
Location
- Location within Beijing

Jiahuihu station (Chinese: 嘉会湖站; pinyin: Jiāhuìhú Zhàn; lit. 'Jiahui Lake station') is a subway station on Line 17 of the Beijing Subway. It is named after the planned Jiahui Lake Wetland Park. The station opened on 31 December 2021, and is the southern terminus of the line.

== Features ==
The station has an underground island platform. There are 3 exits, lettered A, C and D. Exit D is accessible via an elevator.

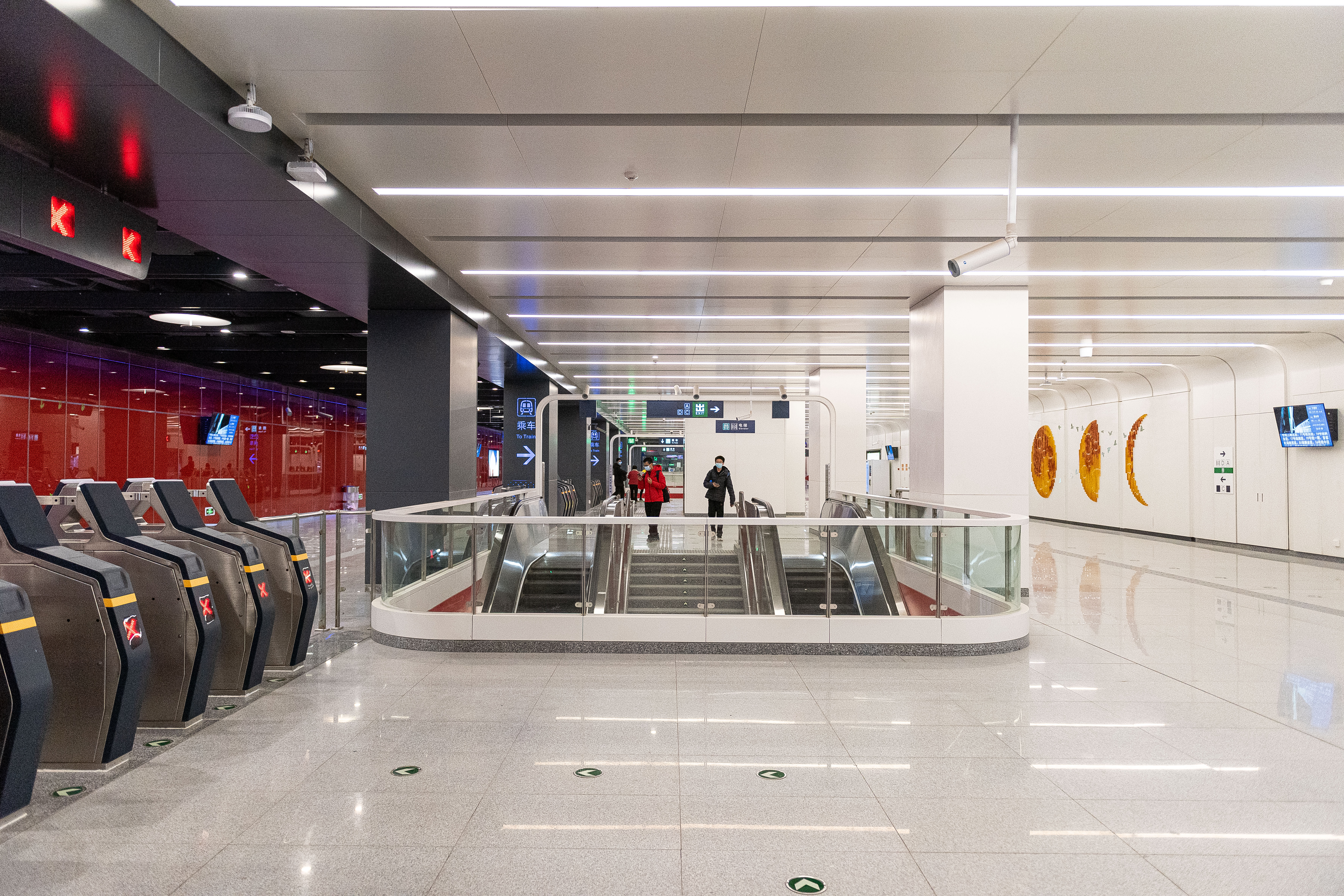
Concourse
