= Weilaikexuechengbei (Future Science City North) station =

Beijing Subway Line 17 station

Weilɑikexuechengbei (Future Science City North) 未来科学城北
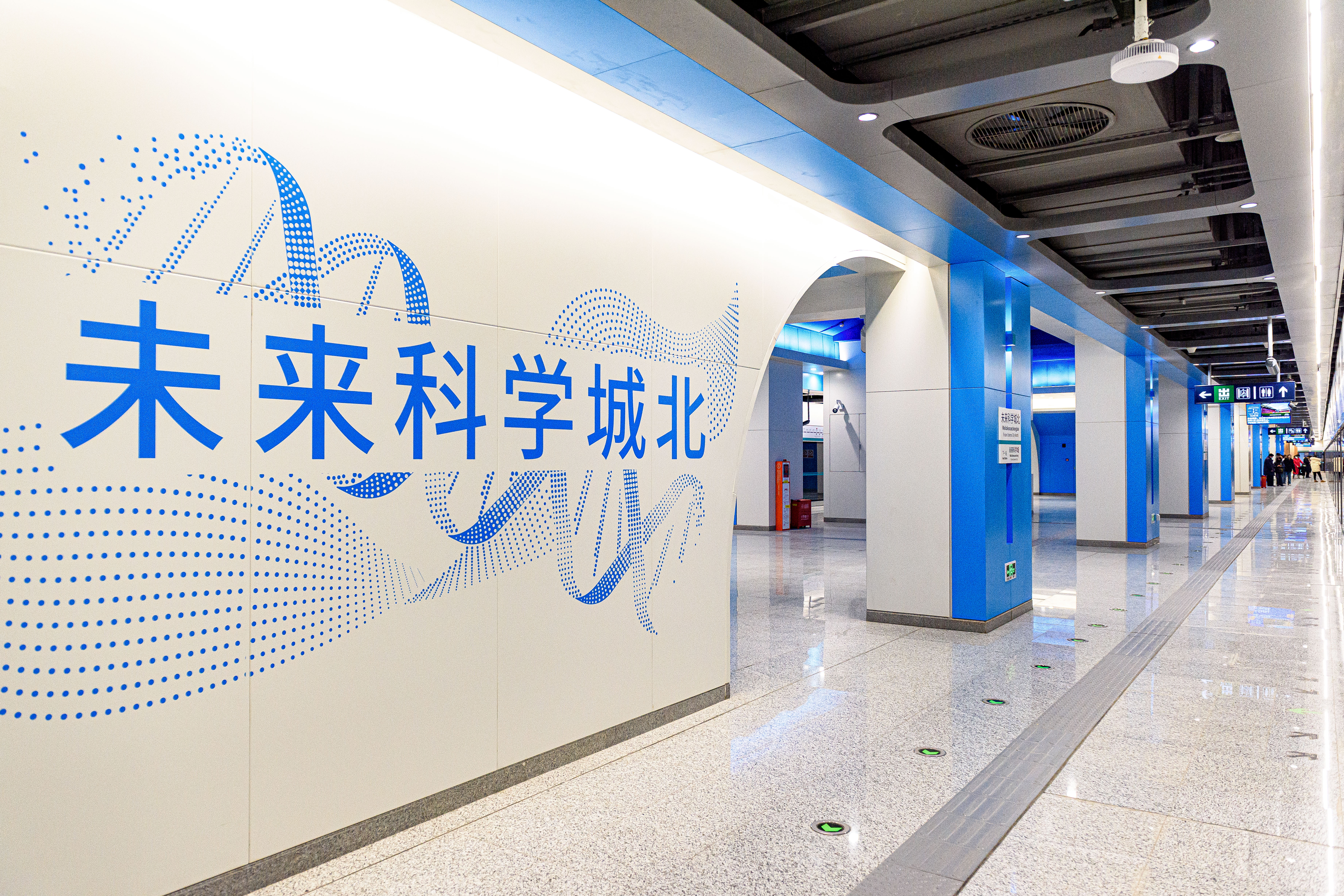
- Platform billboard

General information
- Location: Puqingsi South Street, Beijing Future Science City; Tugou Village (土沟村), Xiaotangshan Town, Changping District, Beijing; People's Republic of China
- Coordinates: 40.12878°N 116.46248°E
- Operator: Beijing MTR
- Line: Line 17
- Platforms: 2 (1 island platform)
- Tracks: 2

Construction
- Structure type: Underground
- Accessible: Yes

History
- Opened: December 30, 2023; 2 years ago

Services
Preceding station	Beijing Subway	Following station
Terminus	Line 17	Weilaikexuecheng (Future Science City) towards Jiahuihu
Location
- Location within Beijing

Weilaikexuechengbei (Future Science City North) station (Chinese: 未来科学城北站; pinyin: Wèilái Kēxuéchéng Běi Zhàn) is the northern terminus of Line 17 of Beijing Subway which opened on December 30, 2023.

== Location ==
The station is located on Puqingsi South Street, in the Beijing Future Science City, in Tugou Village, Xiaotangshan, Changping, Beijing.

== History ==
The construction of the station started in 2016. The station was called Weilai Kejicheng Beiqu (Chinese: 未来科技城北区; pinyin: Wèilái Kējìchéng Běiqū; lit. 'North Area of Future Science and Technology City') at the time.

In 2021, the station was officially renamed as Future Science City North.

The structure of the station was completed no later than 2022.

== Station layout ==
Future Science City North station is an underground station, orientated northeast–southwest, with a total length of 320.1 metres, a total width of the main structure of 23.7 metres, a total floor area of 22,962 square metres, and a platform length of 186 metres, with a platform width of 14 metres.

The station has three underground floors and one island platform. There is property above the station developed by China Resources Land.

There are 3 exits, lettered B, C and D, with Exit B leading to Yingcai North 1st Street, C to Weilaikexuecheng Road and D to Puqingsi Road. Exit C is accessible.

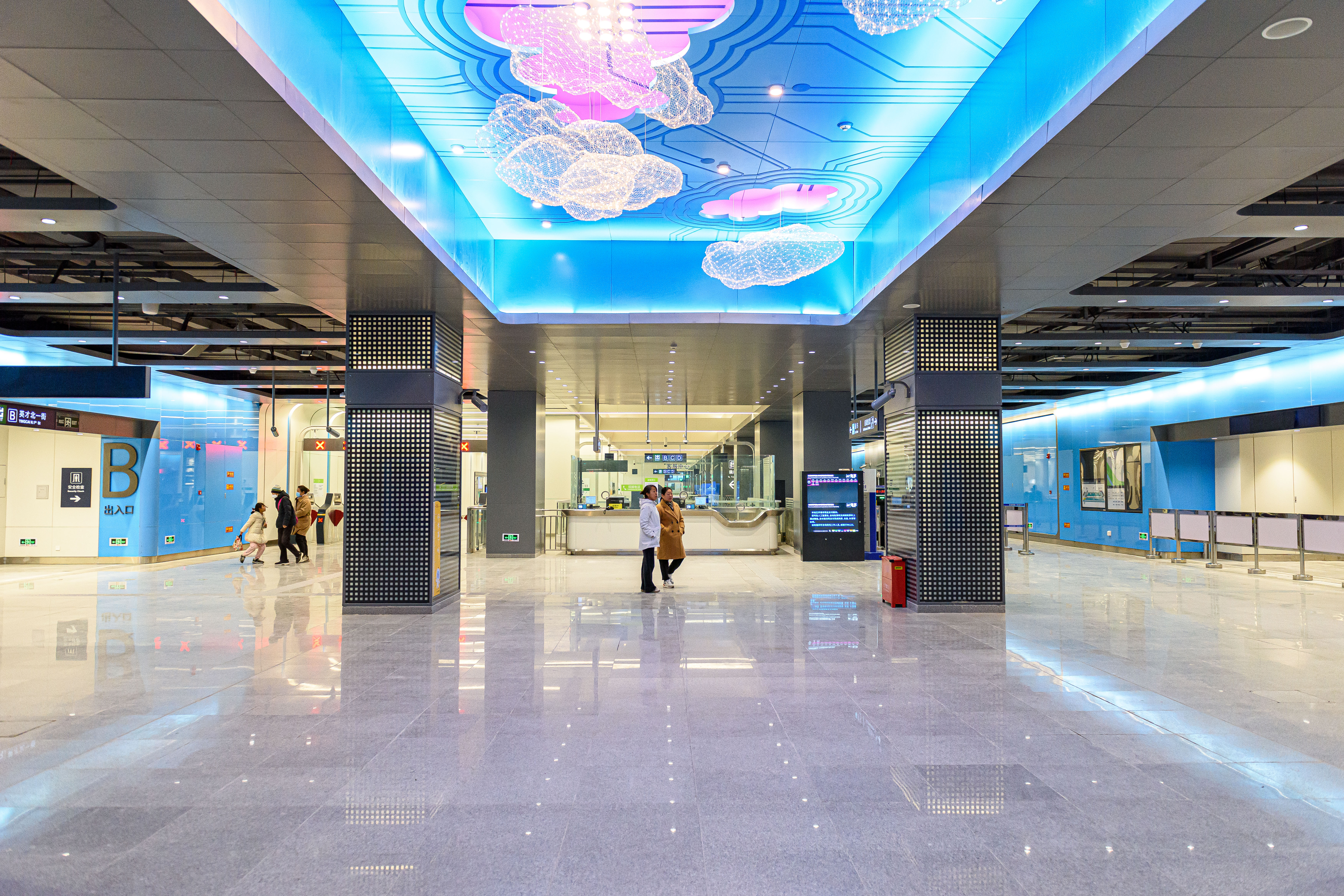
Concourse in January 2024

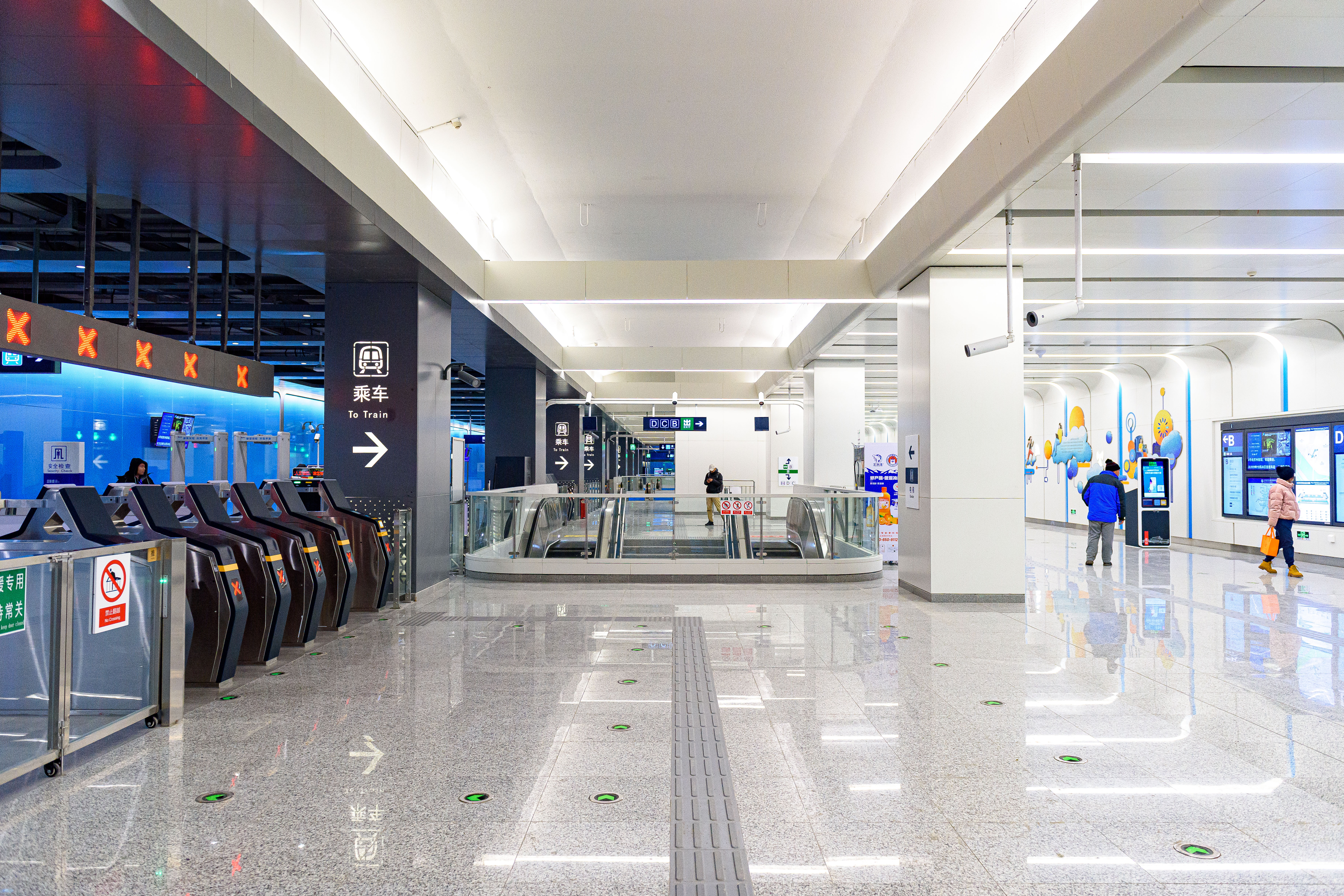
Middle of the concourse

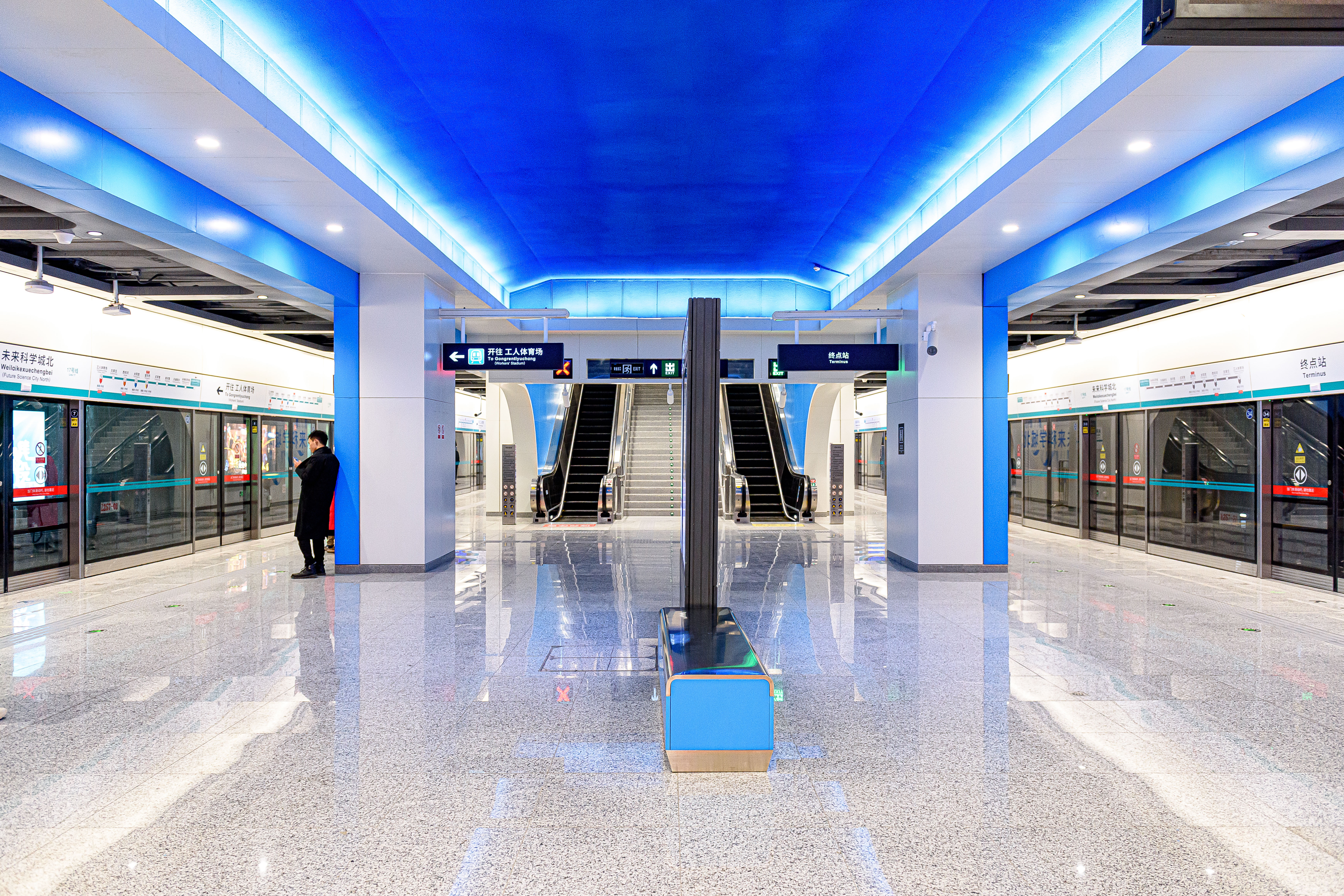
Platform from the south facing north
