= Cuigezhuang =

Cuigezhuang Township 崔各庄乡
- Township
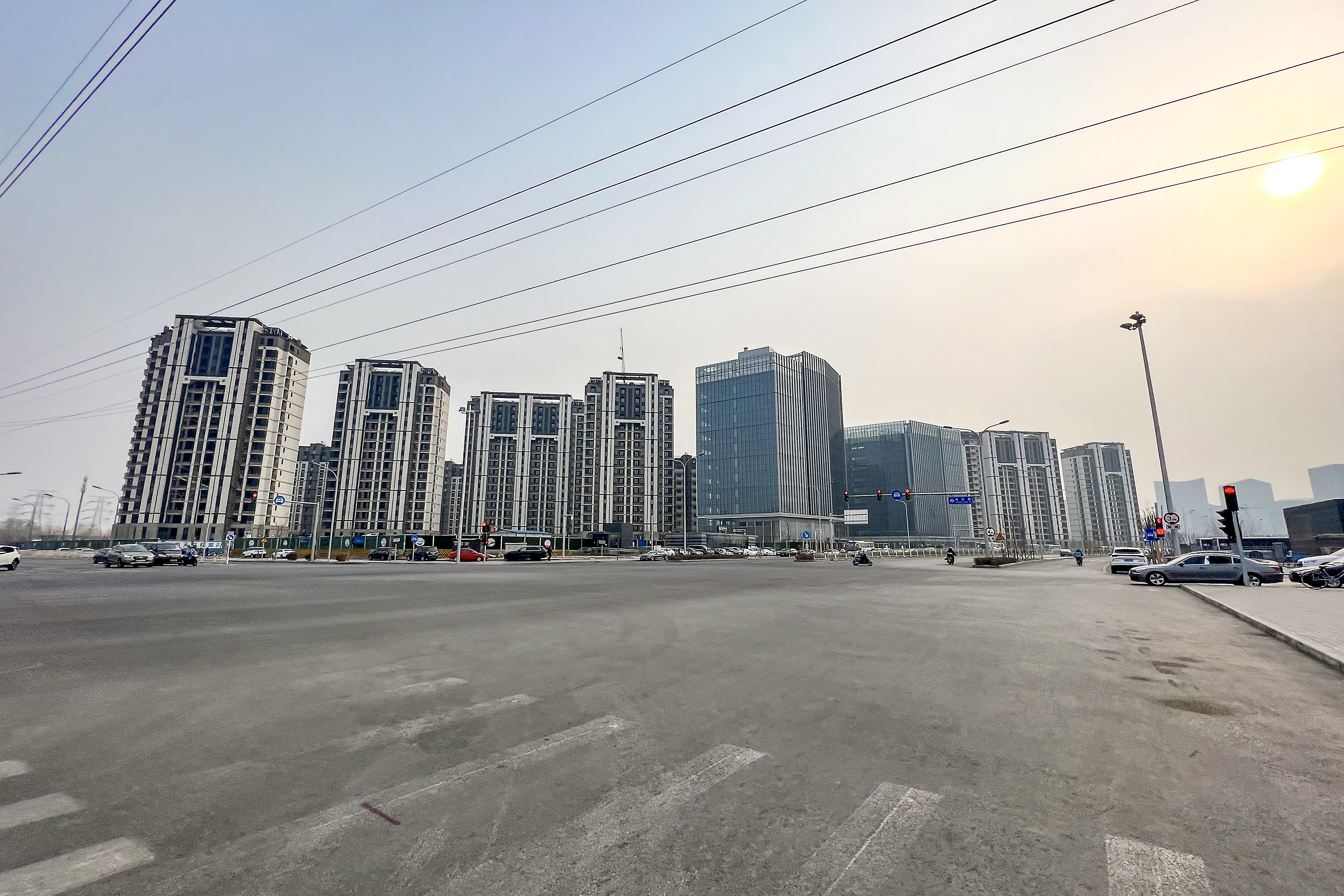
- Buildings near Shangezhuang Village in Cuigezhuang Township

- Location within Beijing Location within China
- Coordinates: 39°59′58″N 116°30′33″E
- Country: China
- Municipality: Beijing
- District: Chaoyang
- Village-level Divisions: 7 communities 15 villages

Area
  - Total: 31.7 km^{2} (12.2 sq mi)

Population (2020)
  - Total: 107,029
  - Density: 3,380/km^{2} (8,740/sq mi)
- Time zone: UTC+8 (China Standard)
- Postal code: 100015
- Area code: 010

Cuigezhuang Township (Chinese: 崔各庄乡; pinyin: Cuīgèzhuāng Xiāng) is a township located in northern Chaoyang District, Beijing, China. It is at the south of Sunhe Township, west of Dongba and Jinzhan Townships, north of Jiuxianqiao Subdistrict and Jiangtai Township, east of Wangjing, Donghu Subdistrict and Laiguangying Township. As of 2020, the population of Cuigezhuang was 107,029.

The name Cuigezhuang (Chinese: 崔各庄; lit. 'Cui Family Village') was from Cuigezhuang village where the current township government resides.

== History ==
Timeline of changes in the status of Cuigezhuang Township
Year	Status
1948	Part of the 9th District, Changshun County, Hebei and the 13th District of Beijing
1949	Part of Tong County, Hebei
1956	Part of Sunhe Township, Beijing
1961	Reorganized into a management station, with villages under it becoming production teams
1965	Converted to a management district with jurisdiction over 8 production teams
1974	Converted to a production team
1984	Reorganized into a township
2004	Incorporated Nangao Township, and became an area while retaining township status

== Administrative Divisions ==
By the end of 2021, there were 22 subdivisions inside Cuigezhuang, where 7 were communities and 15 were villages:

Administrative Division Code	Community Name in Simplified Chinese	Community Name in English	Type
110105038001	马南里	Mananli	Community
110105038008	京旺家园第一	Jingwang Jiayuan Diyi	Community
110105038009	京旺家园第二	Jingwang Jiayuan Di'er	Community
110105038010	燕保马泉营家园	Yanbao Maquanying Jiayuan	Community
110105038011	东洲家园	Dongzhou Jiayuan	Community
110105038012	广善第一	Guangshan Diyi	Community
110105038013	新锦	Xinjin	Community
110105038200	崔各庄	Cuigezhuang	Village
110105038201	善各庄	Shangezhuang	Village
110105038202	何各庄	Hegezhuang	Village
110105038203	马泉营	Maquanying	Village
110105038204	奶东	Naidong	Village
110105038205	奶西	Naixi	Village
110105038206	索家	Suojia	Village
110105038207	费家	Feijia	Village
110105038208	南皋	Nangao	Village
110105038209	望京	Wangjing	Village
110105038210	草场地	Caochangdi	Village
110105038211	东辛店	Dongxindian	Village
110105038212	北皋	Beigao	Village
110105038213	东营	Dongying	Village
110105038214	黑桥	Heiqiao	Village

== See also ==
- List of township-level divisions of Beijing
