= Beiqijia =

Beiqijia Town 北七家镇
- Town
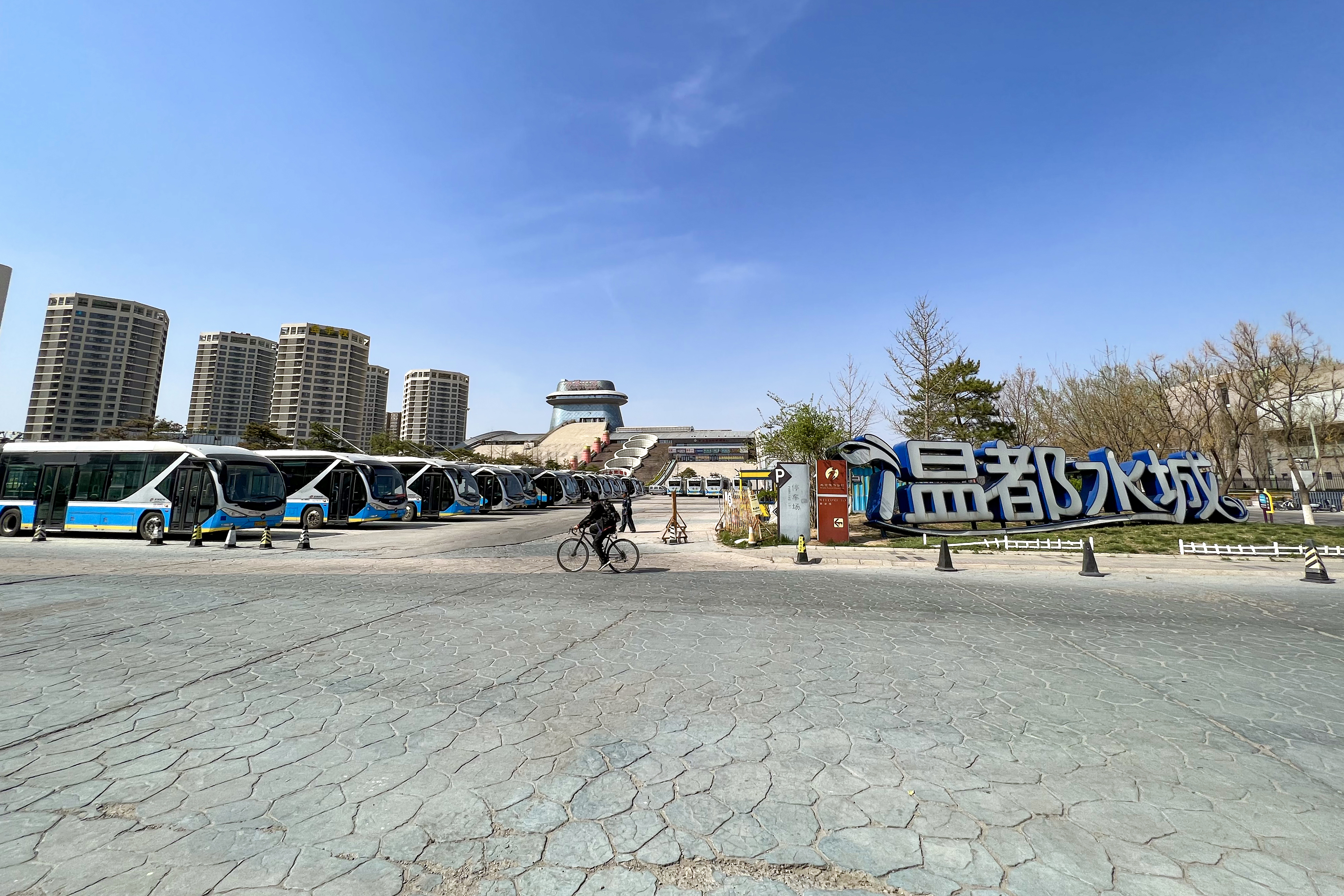
- Hot Spring Leisure City (温都水城) in Beiqijia Town, 2022

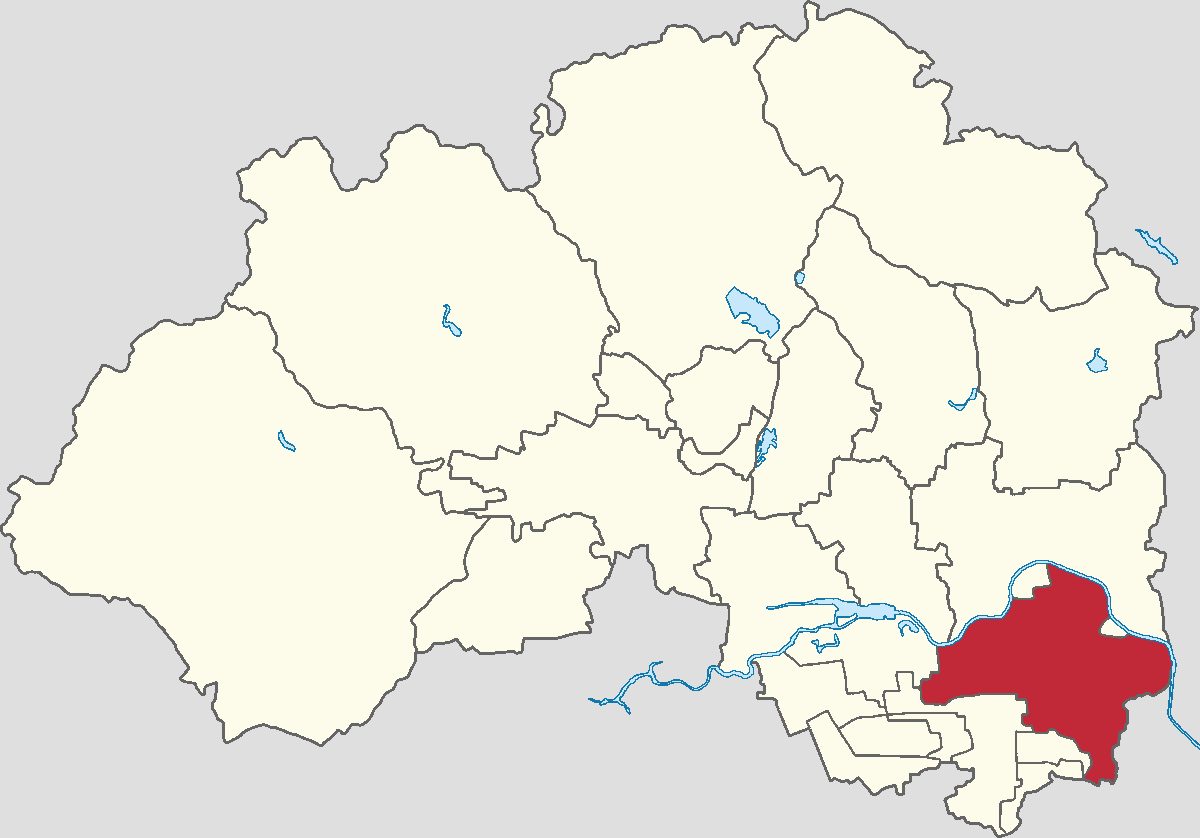
- Location within Changping District

- Location within Beijing Location within China
- Coordinates: 40°06′59″N 116°25′04″E
- Country: China
- Municipality: Beijing
- District: Changping
- Village-level Divisions: 23 communities 19 villages

Area
  - Total: 57.01 km^{2} (22.01 sq mi)
- Elevation: 38 m (125 ft)

Population (2020)
  - Total: 308,907
  - Density: 5,418/km^{2} (14,030/sq mi)
- Time zone: UTC+8 (China Standard)
- Postal code: 102209
- Area code: 010

Beiqijia Town (simplified Chinese: 北七家镇; traditional Chinese: 北七家鎮; pinyin: Běiqījiā Zhèn) is a town located in the southwestern corner of Changping District, Beijing, China. It borders Baishan and Xiaotangshan Towns in the north, Houshayu Town and Sunhe Township in the east, Laiguangying Township and Tiantongyuanbei Subdistrict in the south, Dongxiaokou Town in the southwest, and Shahe Town in the west. Its census population was 308,907 as of 2020.

== History ==
History of Beiqijia Town
Year	Status	Part of
1948 - 1949	7th District	Changshun United County
1949 - 1953	5th District	Changping County
1953 - 1956	Baxianzhuang Township Lutong Township Nanqijiazhuang Township	Changping County
1956 - 1958	Beiqijia Township (Integrated part of Yandan Township in 1956)	Changping County
1958 - 1959	Beiqijia Working Station within Xiaotangshan People's Commune	Changping County
1959 - 1960	Shahe People's Commune	Changping County
1960 - 1962	Beiqijia Management Area, within Shahe Sino-Vietnamese Friendship People's Commune	Changping County
1962 - 1982	Beiqijia People's Commune	Changping County
1982 - 1997	Beiqijia Township	Changping County
1997 - 1999	Beiqijia Town (Incorporated Yandan Township and Pingxifu Town in 1999)	Changping County
1999–present	Beiqijia Town (Incorporated Yandan Township and Pingxifu Town in 1999)	Changping District

== Administrative divisions ==
As of 2021, Beiqijia Town oversees 42 subdivisions, where 23 are communities, and 19 are villages:

Administrative division code	Subdivision names	Name transliteration	Type
110114115001	燕城苑	Yanchengyuan	Community
110114115002	王府公寓	Wangfu Gongyu	Community
110114115003	望都家园	Wangdu Jiayuan	Community
110114115008	温泉花园A区	Wenquan Huayuan A Qu	Community
110114115009	温泉花园B区	Wenquan Huayuan B Qu	Community
110114115010	西湖新村	Xihu XIncun	Community
110114115011	名佳花园	Mingjia Huayuan	Community
110114115012	名流花园	Mingliu Huayuan	Community
110114115013	蓬莱公寓	Penglai Gongyu	Community
110114115014	北亚花园	Beiya Huayuan	Community
110114115015	王府花园	Wangfu Huayuan	Community
110114115016	八仙别墅	Baxian Bieshu	Community
110114115017	桃园公寓	Taoyuan Gongyu	Community
110114115018	冠雅苑	Guanyayuan	Community
110114115019	宏福苑	Hongfuyuan	Community
110114115020	美树假日嘉园	Meishu Jiari Jiayuan	Community
110114115021	望都新地	Wangdu Xindi	Community
110114115022	宏福苑东区	Hongfuyuan Dongqu	Community
110114115023	金色漫香苑	Jinse Manxiangyuan	Community
110114115024	枫树家园	Fengshu Jiayuan	Community
110114115025	冠华苑	Guanhuayuan	Community
110114115026	世纪星城	Shiji Xingcheng	Community
110114115027	名佳花园三区	Mingjia Huayuan Sanqu	Community
110114115201	沟自头	Gouzitou	Village
110114115202	北七家	Beiqijia	Village
110114115203	岭上	Lingshang	Village
110114115204	鲁疃	Lutuan	Village
110114115205	东二旗	Dong'erqi	Village
110114115206	羊各庄	Yanggezhuang	Village
110114115207	八仙庄	Baxianzhuang	Village
110114115208	曹碾	Caonian	Village
110114115209	白庙	Baimiao	Village
110114115210	东三旗	Dongsanqi	Village
110114115211	平西府	Pingxifu	Village
110114115212	平坊	Pingfang	Village
110114115213	西沙各庄	Xi Shagezhuang	Village
110114115214	郑各庄	Zhenggezhuang	Village
110114115215	东沙各庄	Dong Shagezhuang	Village
110114115216	燕丹	Yandan	Village
110114115218	歇甲庄	Xiejiazhuang	Village
110114115220	南七家庄	Nan Qijiazhuang	Village
110114115221	海䴖落	Haijingluo	Village

== Gallery ==
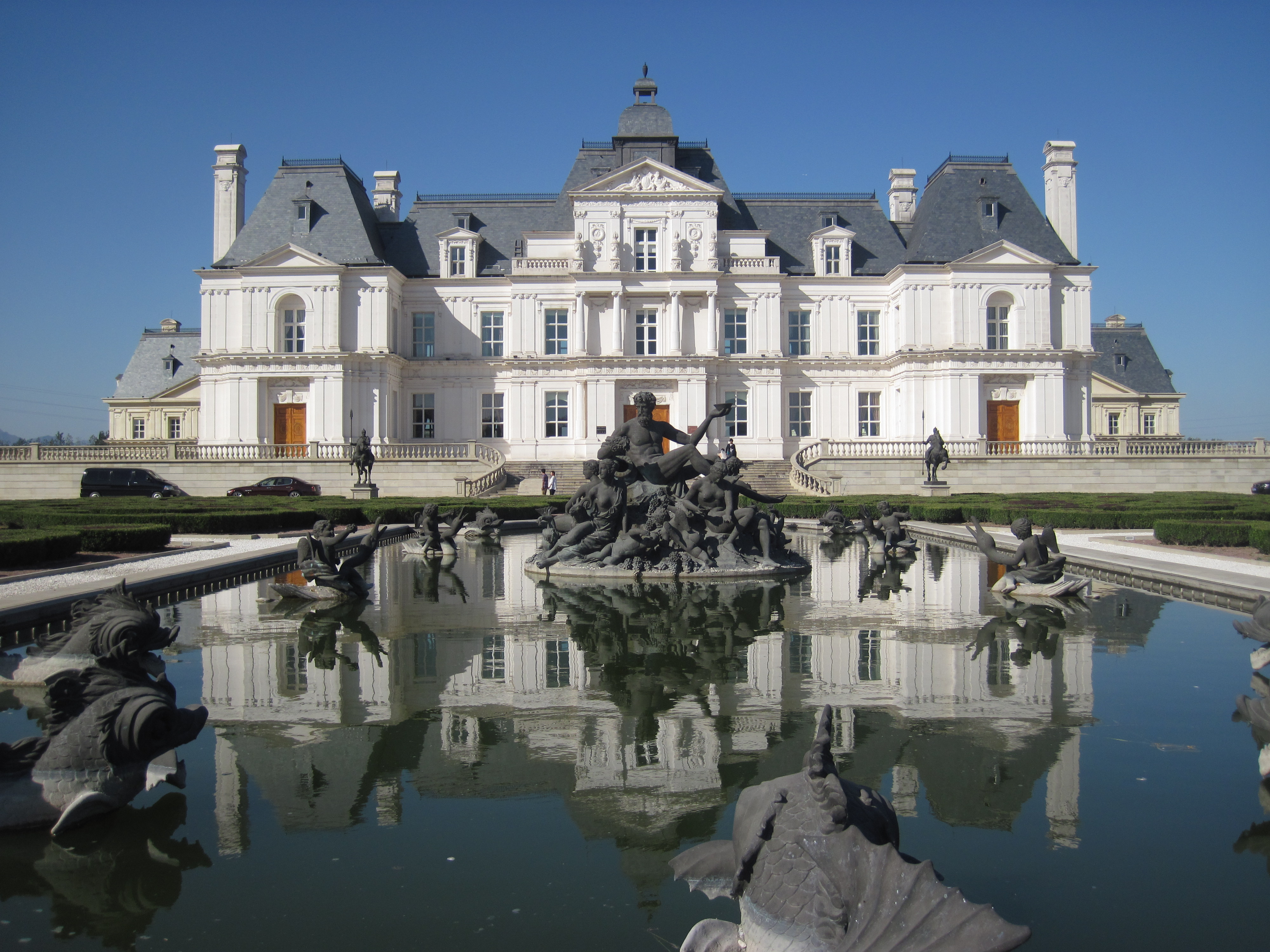
Lafayette Hotel on the northeast of the town, 2009

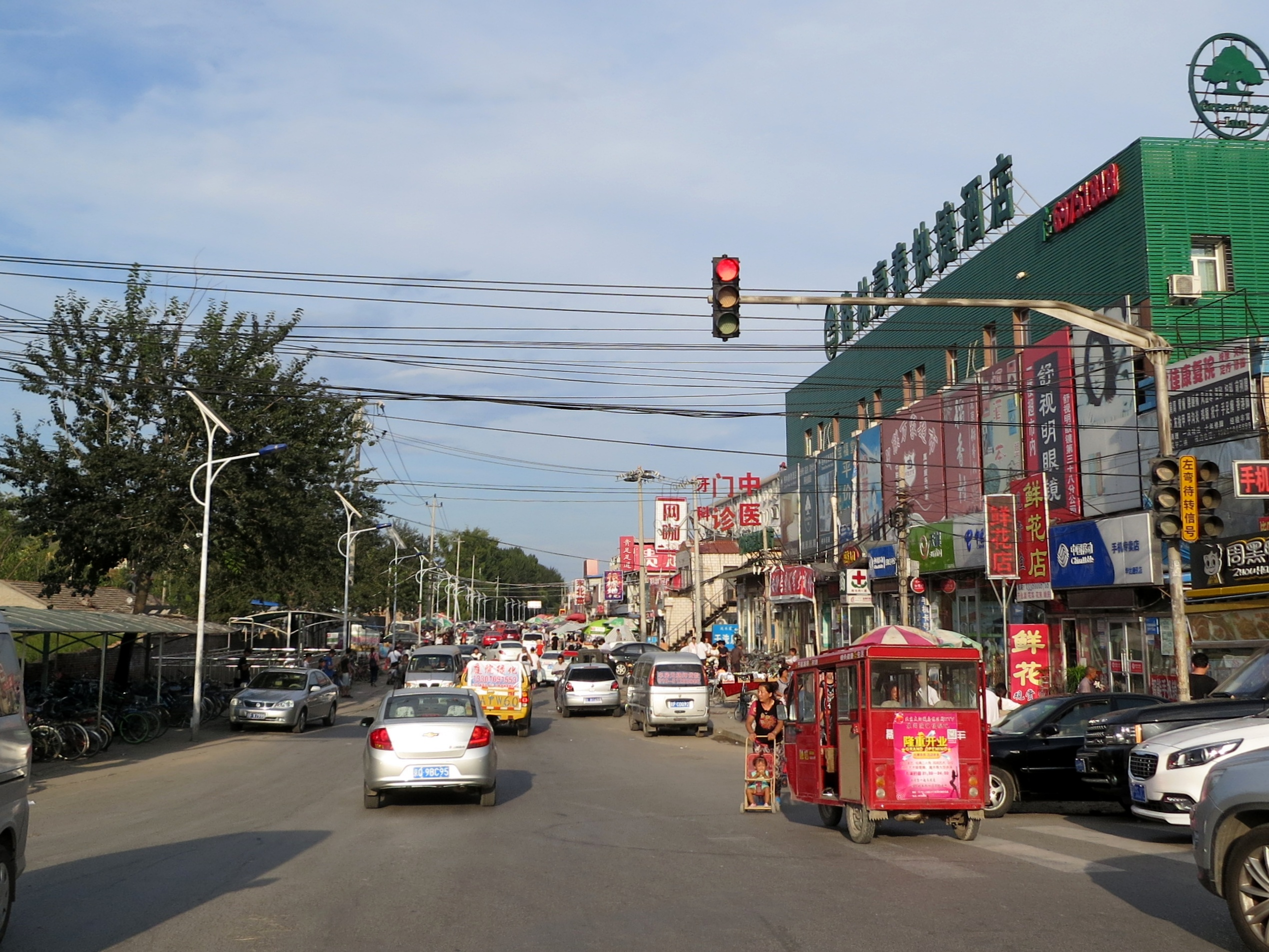
Litang Road within Beiqijia Town, 2015

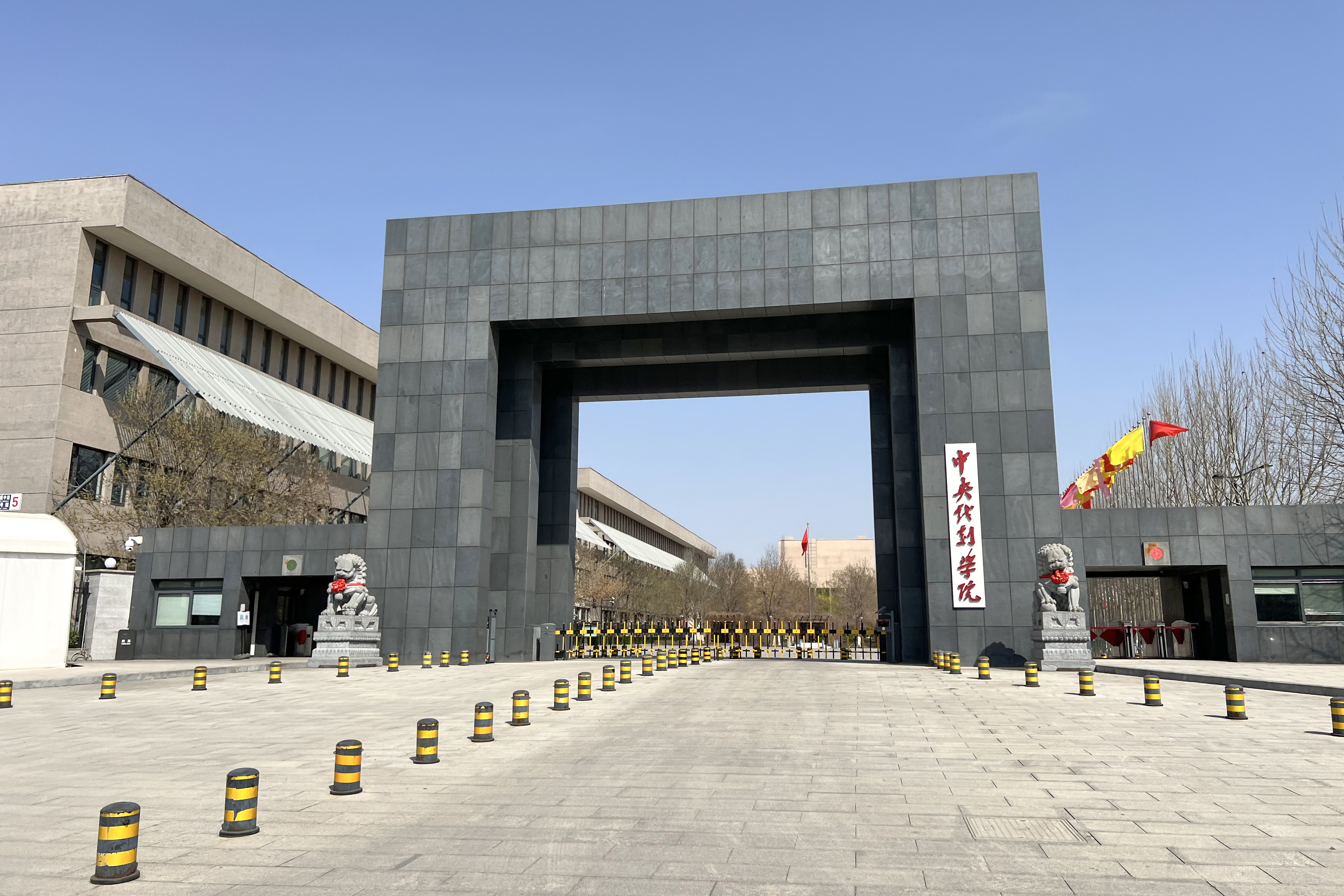
Changping Campus of Central Academy of Drama

== Transport ==
- Weilaikexuecheng (Future Science City) station on Line 17.

== See also ==
- List of township-level divisions of Beijing
