= Qingheying station =

Beijing Subway Line 17 station

Qingheying 清河营
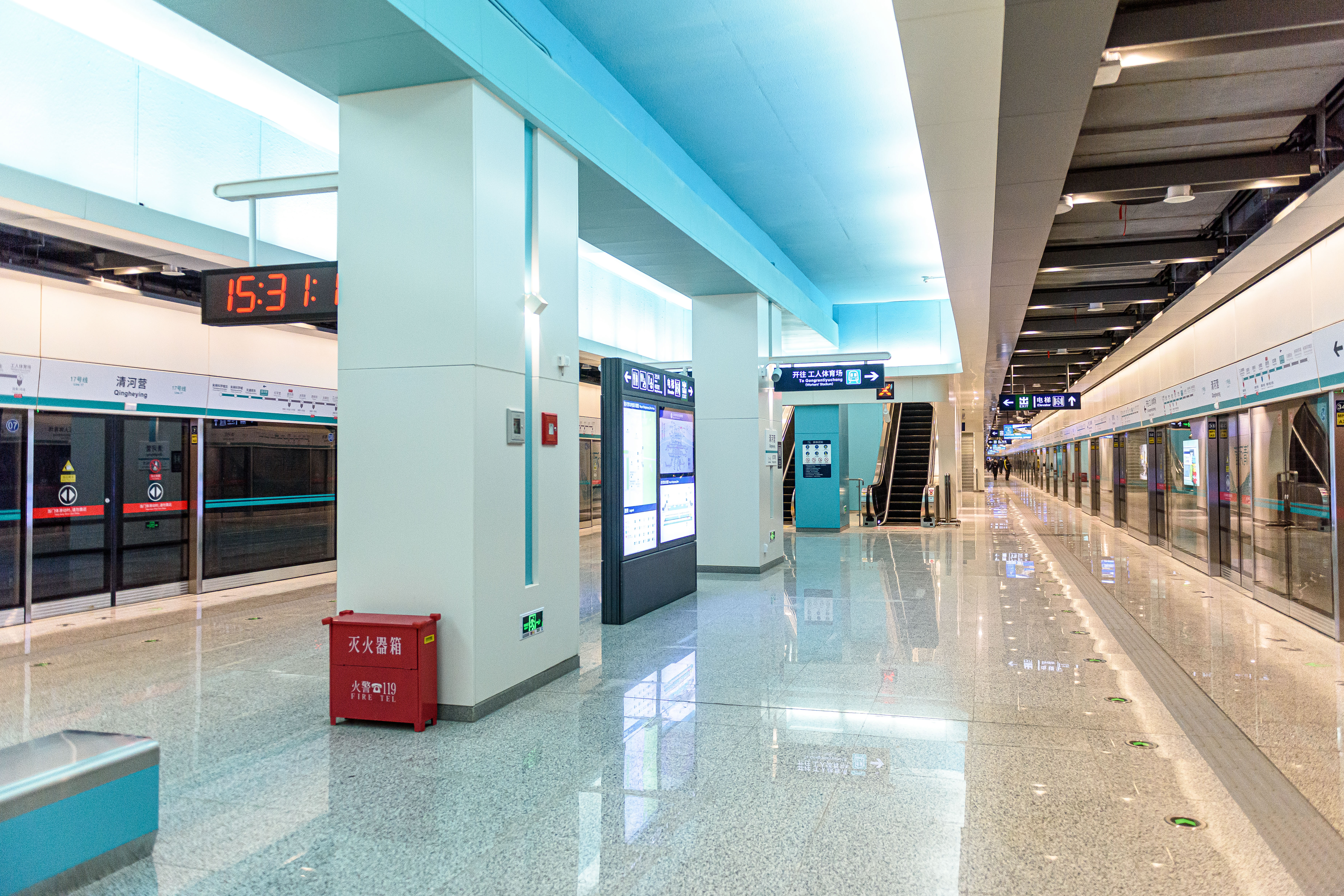
- Platform

General information
- Location: Interchange between Shui'an South Street (水岸南街) and Beiyuan East Road (北苑东路); Qingheying Village, Laiguangying, Chaoyang District, Beijing; People's Republic of China
- Coordinates: 40.04996°N 116.43575°E
- Operator: Beijing MTR
- Line: Line 17
- Platforms: 2 (1 island platform)
- Tracks: 2

Construction
- Structure type: Underground
- Accessible: Yes

History
- Opened: December 30, 2023; 2 years ago

Services
Preceding station	Beijing Subway	Following station
Tiantongyuandong towards Weilaikexuechengbei (Future Science City North)	Line 17	Hongjunying towards Jiahuihu
Location
- Location within Beijing

Qingheying station (Chinese: 清河营站; pinyin: Qīnghéyíng Zhàn) is an underground station of Line 17 of the Beijing Subway. It opened on December 30, 2023.

== Location ==
The station is located under the interchange between Shui'an South Street (水岸南街) and Beiyuan East Road (北苑东路) in Qingheying Village, where the station name comes from, in Laiguangying, Chaoyang, Beijing.

== Station layout ==
The station is an underground station with 1 island platformwith a total length of 360 metres and a total width of 21.1 metres.

There are 4 exits, lettered A, B, C and D. Exits A and D lead to Shui'an South Street, B and C to Beiyuan East Road. Exits A and C are accessible.

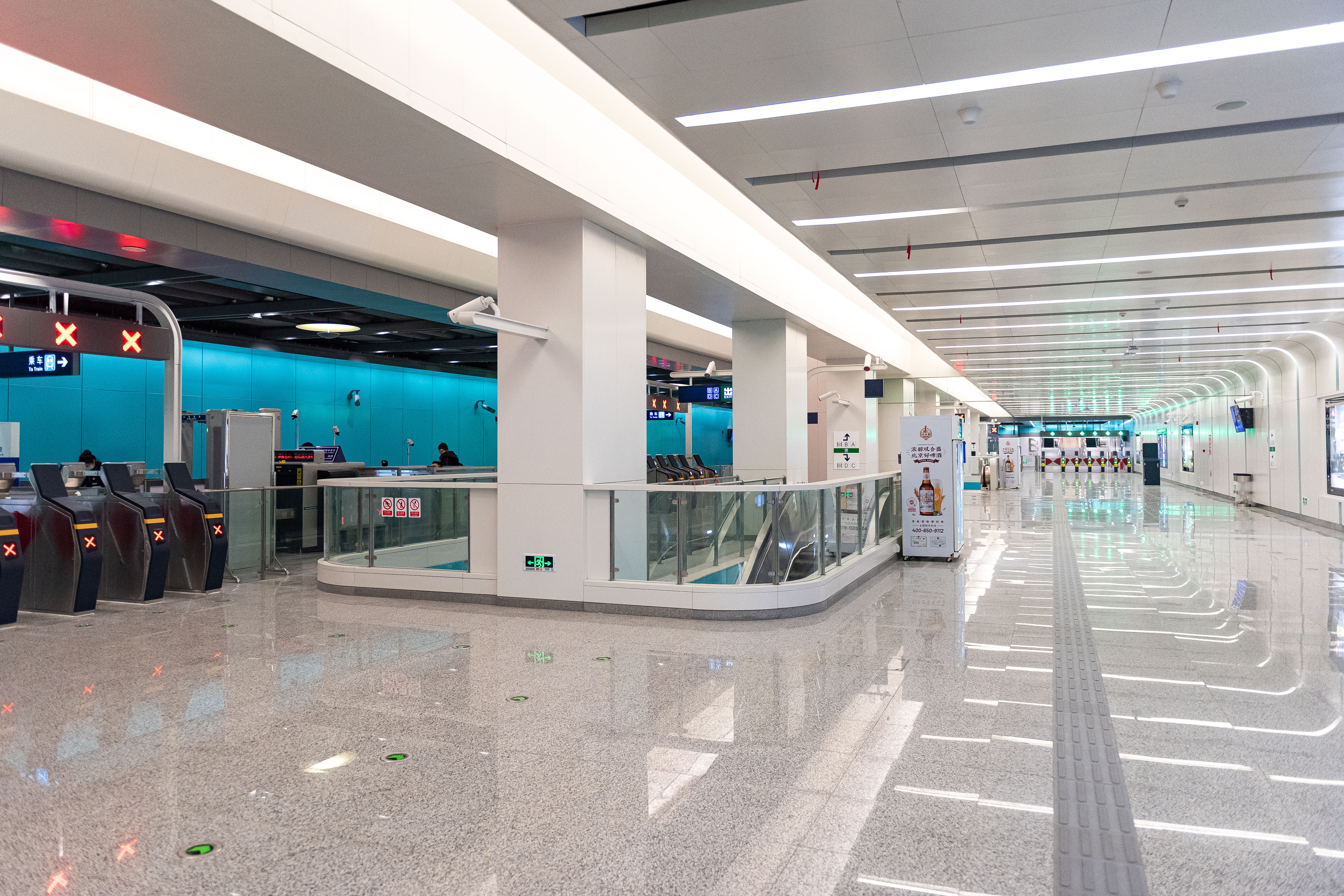
Concourse [1]

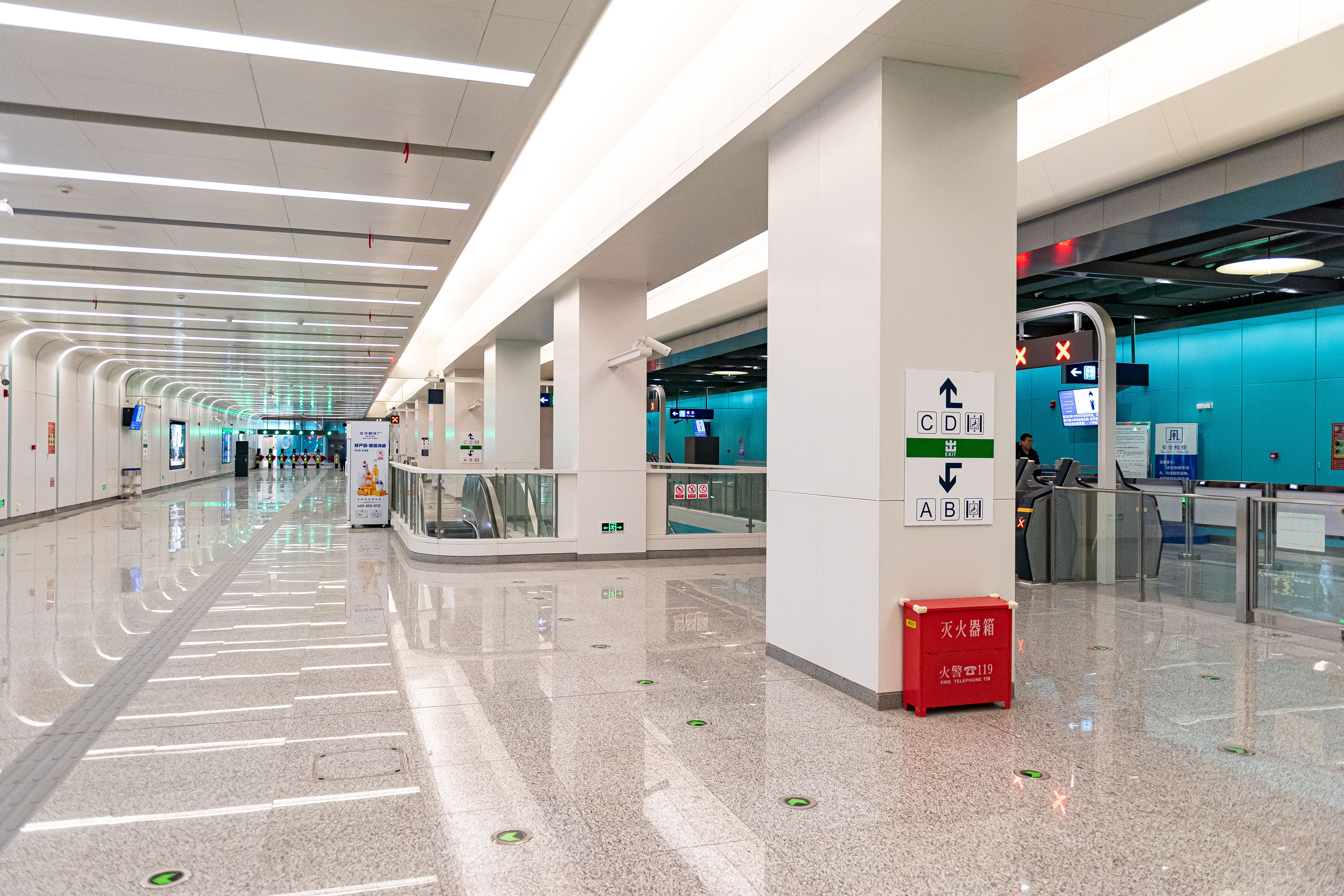
Concourse [2]
