= Hongjunying station =

Beijing Subway Line 17 station

Hongjunying 红军营
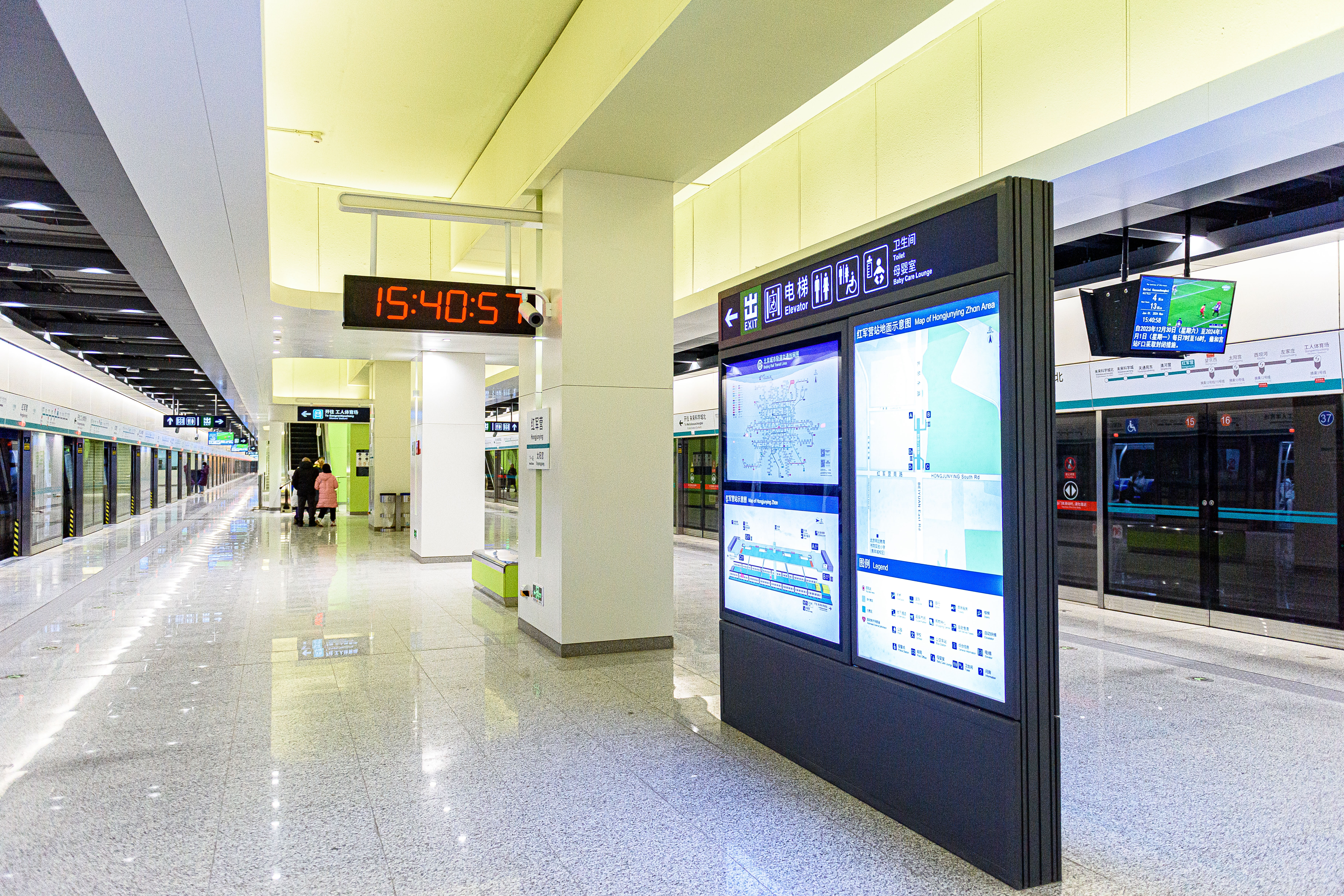
- Platform in January 2024

General information
- Location: Interchange between Hongjunying South Road (红军营南路) and Beiyuan East Road (北苑东路); On the border between Hongjunying Village and Xinsheng Village, in Laiguangying, Chaoyang District, Beijing; People's Republic of China
- Coordinates: 40.03287°N 116.43557°E
- Operator: Beijing MTR
- Line: Line 17
- Platforms: 2 (1 island platform)
- Tracks: 2

Construction
- Structure type: Underground
- Accessible: Yes

History
- Opened: December 30, 2023; 2 years ago

Services
Preceding station	Beijing Subway	Following station
Qingheying towards Weilaikexuechengbei (Future Science City North)	Line 17	Wangjingxi towards Jiahuihu
Location
- Location within Beijing

Hongjunying station (Chinese: 红军营站; pinyin: Hóngjūnyíng Zhàn) is an underground station of Line 17 of the Beijing Subway. It opened on December 30, 2023.

== Location ==
The station is located under the interchange between Hongjunying South Road (红军营南路) and Beiyuan East Road (北苑东路) on the border between Hongjunying Village, where the station name comes from, and Xinsheng Village, in Laiguangying, Chaoyang, Beijing.

== History ==
The station was formerly named as Yongshiying (Chinese: 勇士营) station. In 2023, the station was renamed as Hongjunying.

== Layout ==
The station has an underground island platform. There are 5 exits, lettered A, B, C, D_{1} and D_{2}. Exits B and D_{2} are accessible.

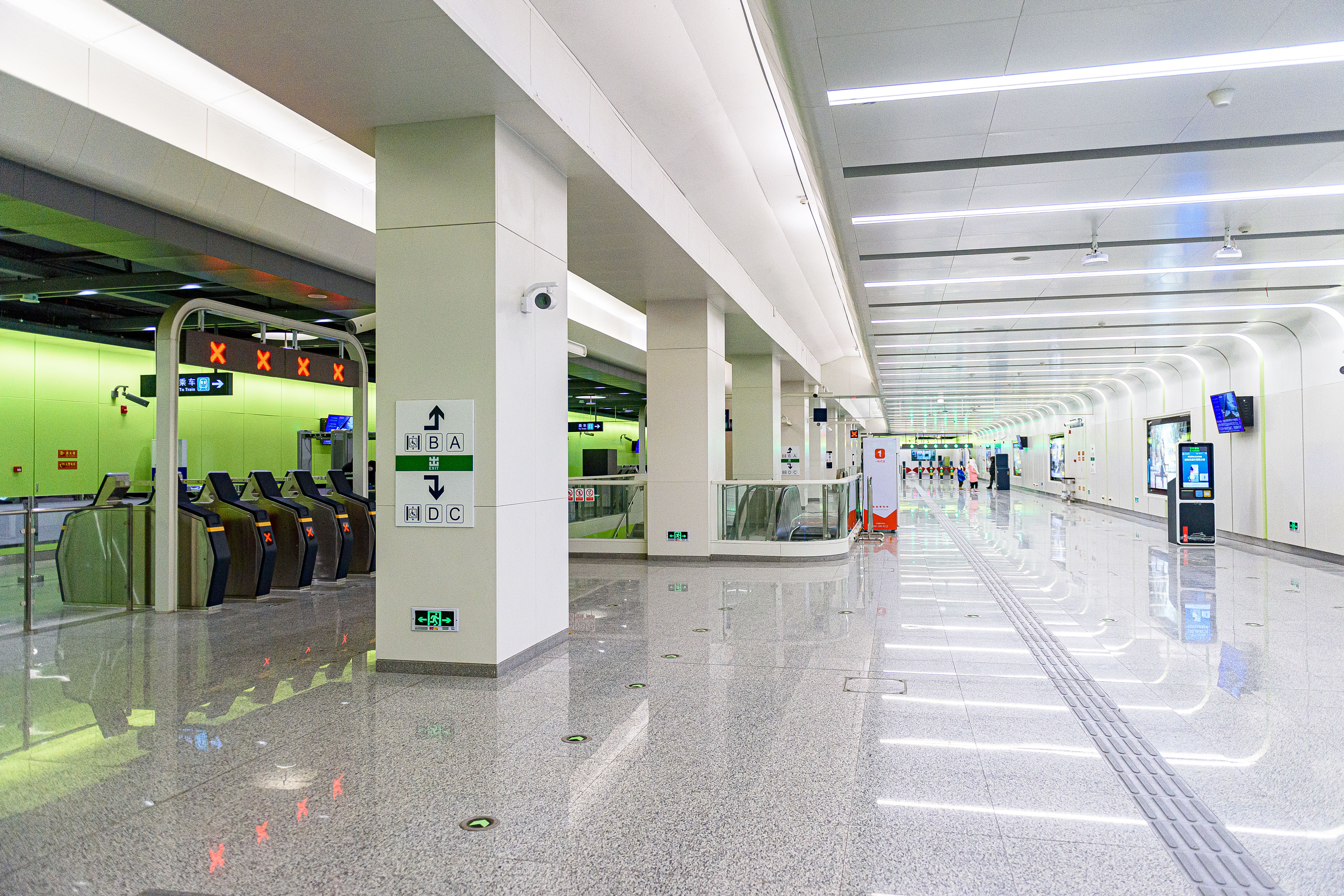
Concourse
