= Dongba Park =

Public park in Beijing, China

- Type: Urban park
- Location: Dongba, Chaoyang District, Beijing, China
- Area: 234.2 hectares (579 acres)
- Created: 2008
- Status: Open all year

Dongba Park (Chinese: 东坝公园; pinyin: Dōngbà Gōngyuán) is a suburban public park in Dongba, Chaoyang District, Beijing, China. It covers a territory that is 3 times larger in size than the Forbidden City. It is located near the eastern segment of 5th Ring Road. There are hundreds of plant species in the park, including many fruits, such as peach, cherry, pear, apricot and jujube. In certain months, visitors are allowed to pick those fruits for free.
