= Weilaikexuecheng (Future Science City) station =

Beijing Subway Line 17 station

Weilɑikexuecheng (Future Science City) 未来科学城
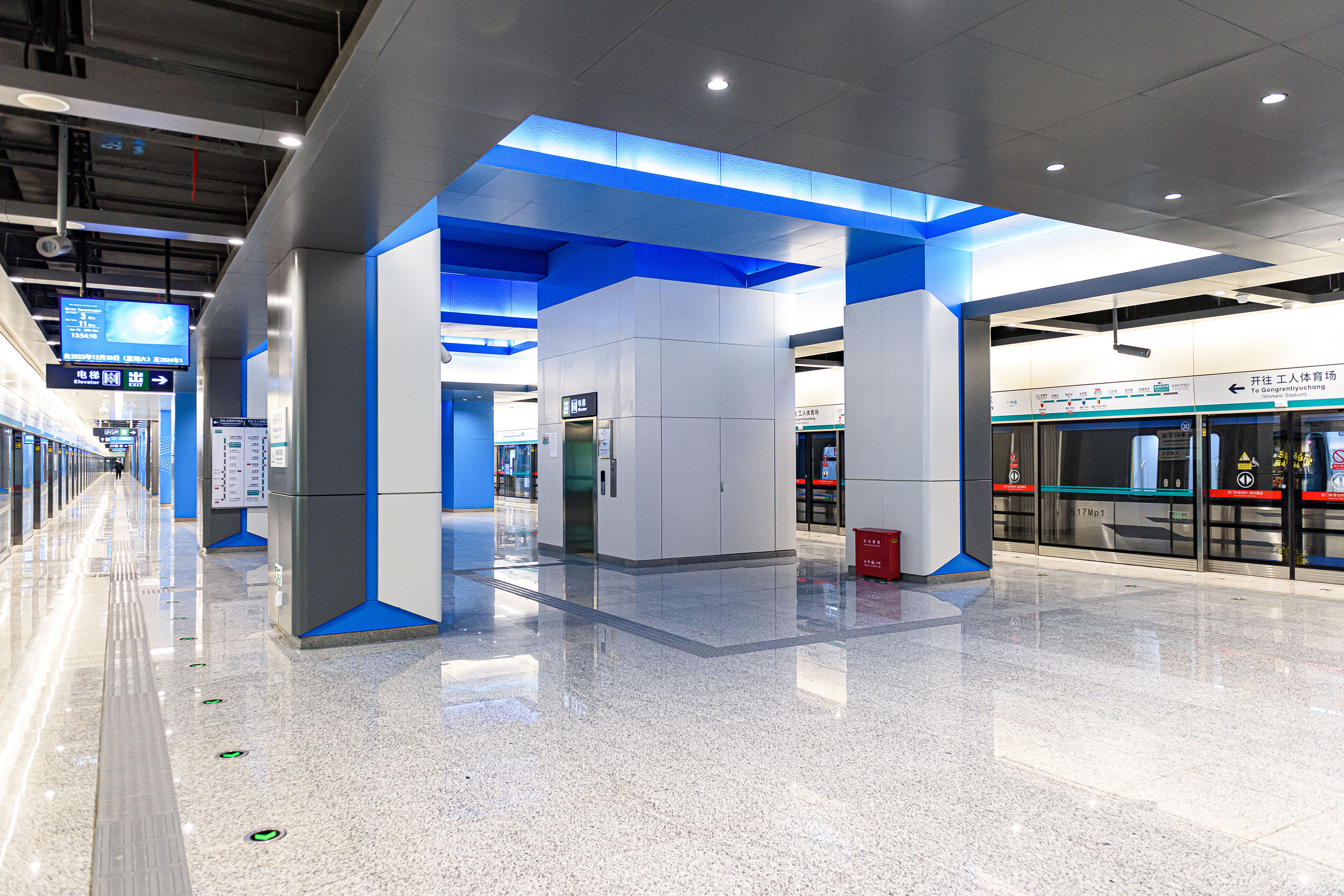
- Platform

General information
- Location: Interchange between Weilaikexuecheng Road (未来科学城路) and Yingcai South 1st Street (英才南一街); Beijing Future Science City; Lutuan Village (鲁疃村), Beiqijia, Changping District, Beijing; People's Republic of China
- Coordinates: 40.11424°N 116.46043°E
- Operator: Beijing MTR
- Line: Line 17
- Platforms: 2 (1 island platform)
- Tracks: 2

Construction
- Structure type: Underground
- Accessible: Yes

History
- Opened: December 30, 2023; 2 years ago
- Former names: Weilai Kejicheng Nanqu (未来科技城南区), Future Science City South (未来科学城南)

Services
Preceding station	Beijing Subway	Following station
Weilaikexuechengbei (Future Science City North) Terminus	Line 17	Tiantongyuandong towards Jiahuihu
Location
- Location within Beijing

Weilaikexuecheng (Future Science City) station (Chinese: 未来科学城站; pinyin: Wèilái Kēxuéchéng Zhàn) is an underground station of Beijing Subway Line 17. It opened on December 30, 2023.

== Location ==
The station is located in the Beijing Future Science City, in the Lutuan Village (鲁疃村), Beiqijia, Changping, Beijing.

== History ==
The construction of the station started in 2016. The station was called Weilai Kejicheng Nanqu (Chinese: 未来科技城南区; pinyin: Wèilái Kējìchéng Nánqū; lit. 'South Area of Future Science and Technology City') at the time.

In 2021, the station was renamed as Future Science City South. In 2023, the station was officially named as Future Science City station.

The structure of the station was completed no later than 2022.

== Station layout ==
Future Science City station is an underground station with a total length of 496.8 metres, a total width of the main structure of 23.7 metres and a platform length of 186 metres, with a platform width of 14 metres.

The station has three underground floors and one island platform. Future Metropolitan, a TOD property near the station is developed by Poly Real Estate.

There are 4 exits, lettered A, B, C and D. Exits A and C lead to Yingcai South 1st Street, and Exits B and D lead to Weilaikexuecheng Road. Exit A is accessible.

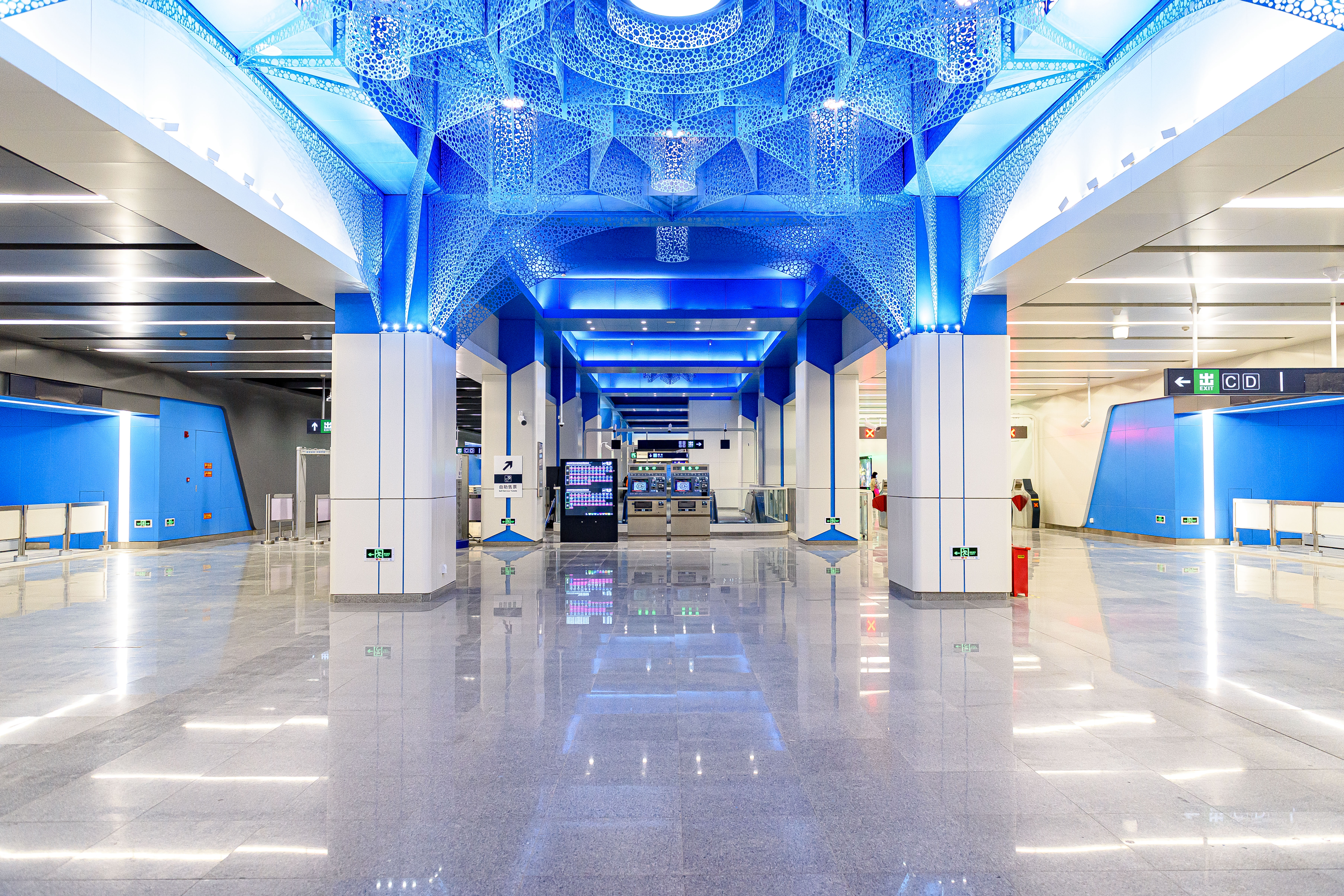
Middle of the concourse [1]

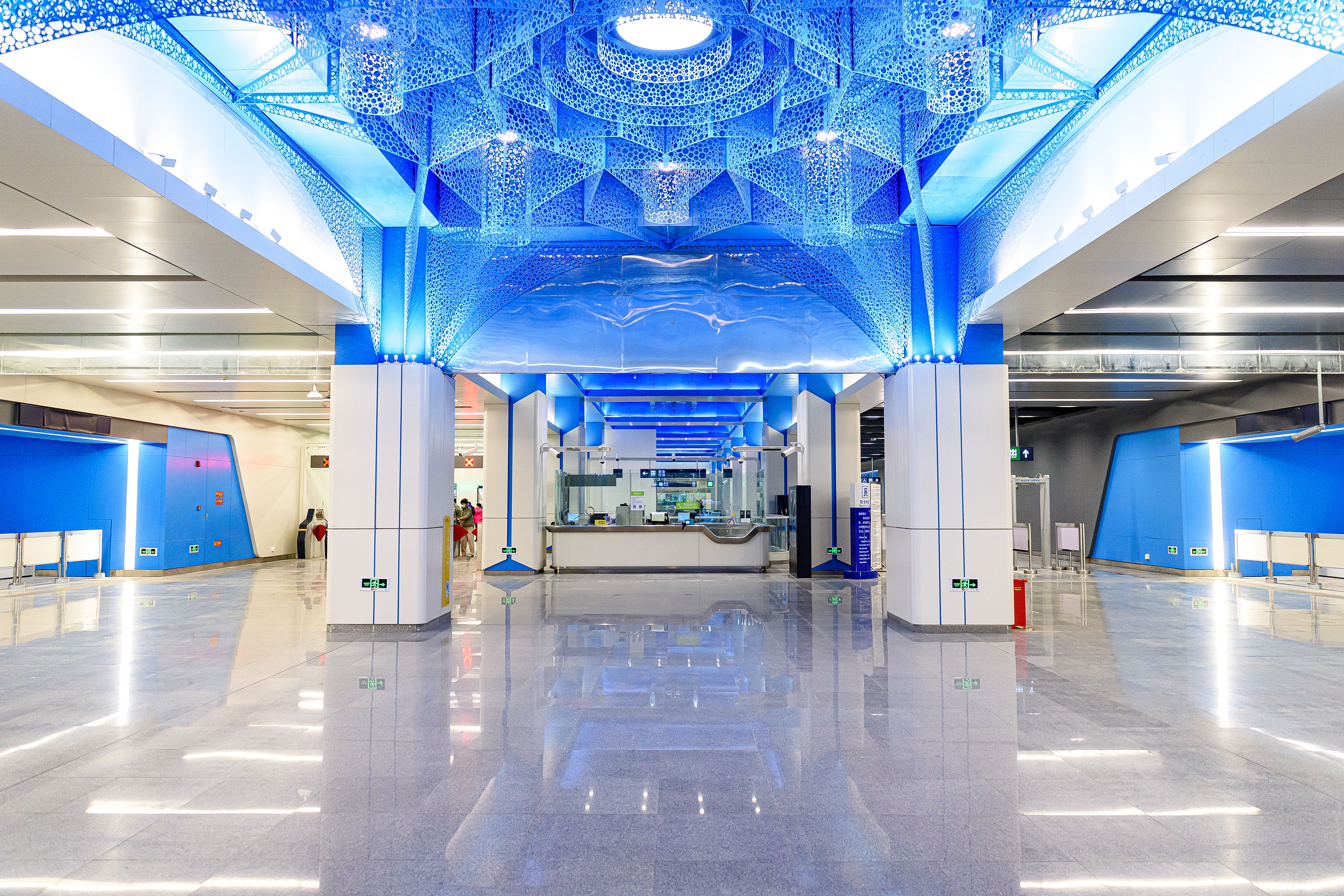
Middle of the concourse [2]

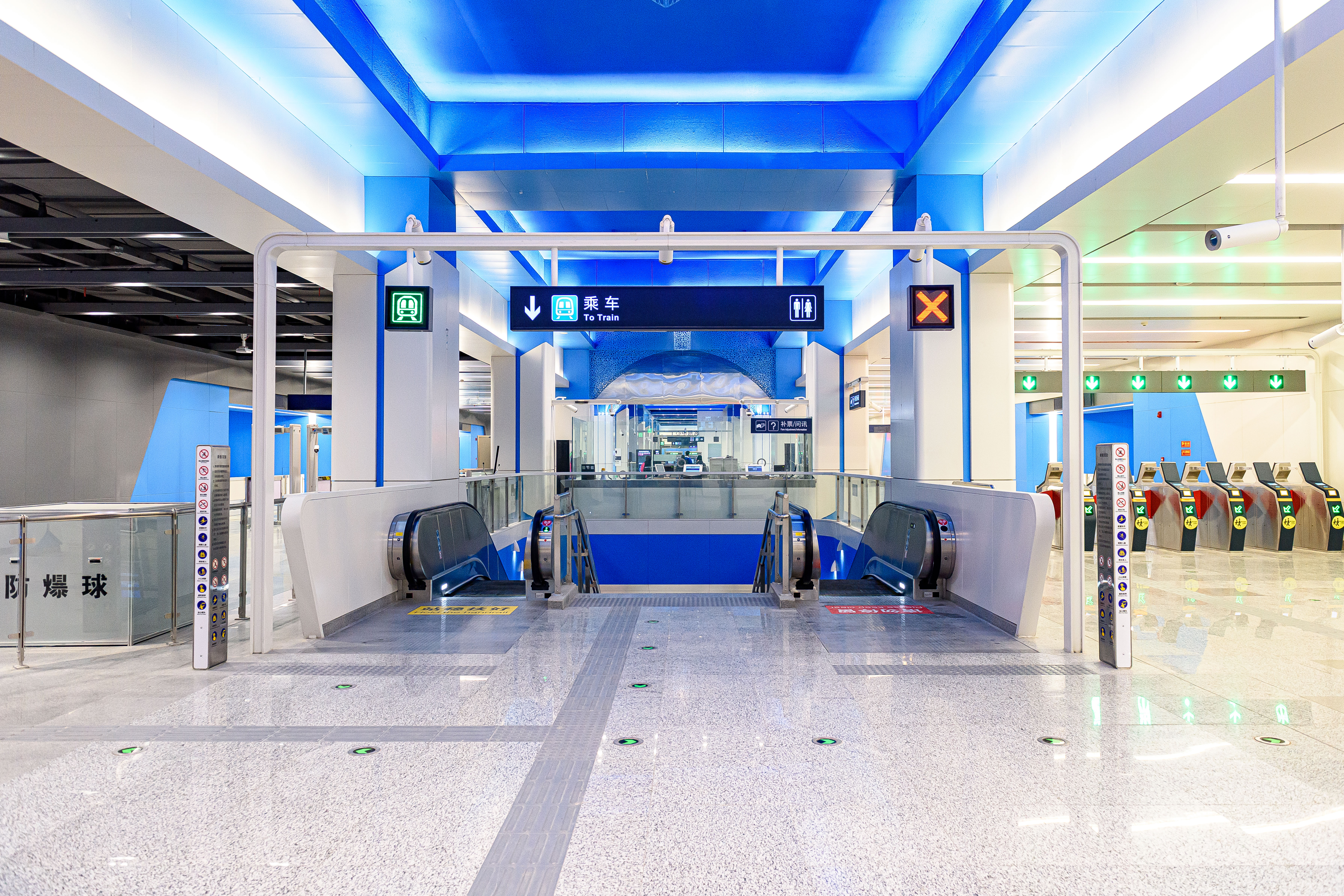
Faregates at the north of the concourse

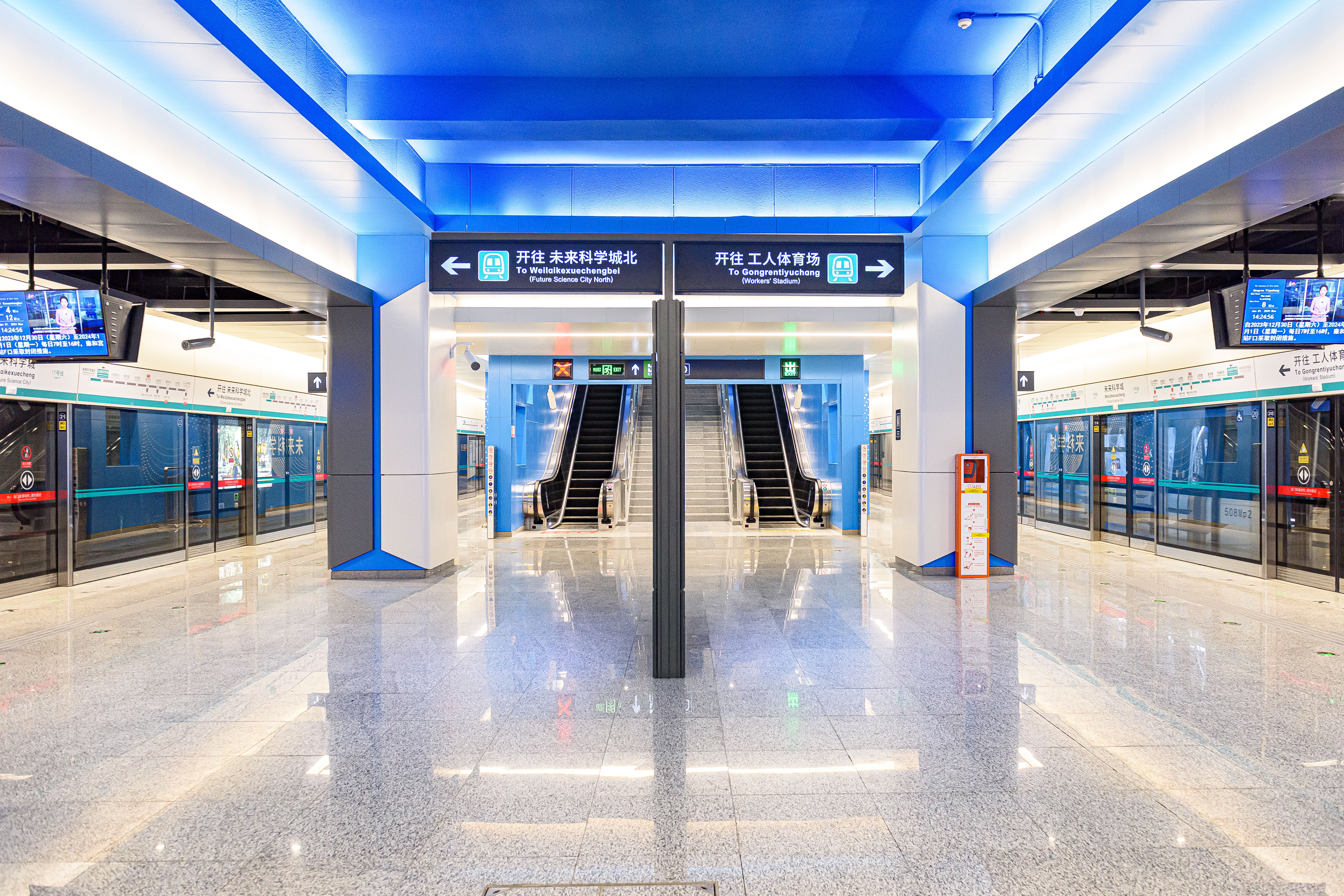
Middle of the platform
