= Dongba Township =

Dongba Township 东坝乡
- Township
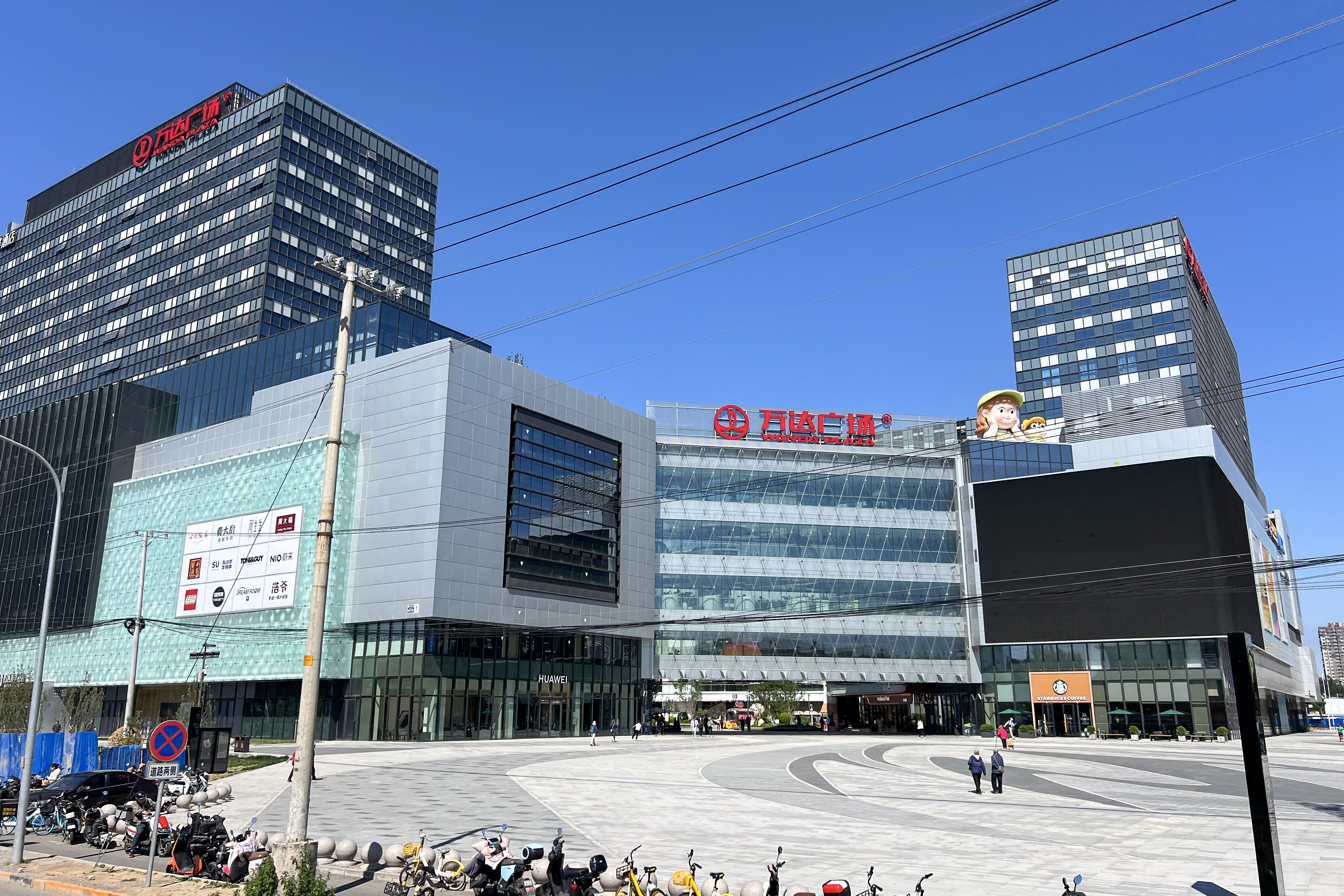
- Dongba Wanda Plaza, 2024

- Location within Beijing Location within China
- Coordinates: 39°57′45″N 116°33′01″E
- Country: China
- Municipality: Beijing
- District: Chaoyang
- Village-level Divisions: 23 communities 9 villages

Area
  - Total: 24.6 km^{2} (9.5 sq mi)

Population (2020)
  - Total: 124,163
  - Density: 5,050/km^{2} (13,100/sq mi)
- Time zone: UTC+8 (China Standard)
- Postal code: 100018
- Area code: 010

Dongba Township (Chinese: 东坝乡; pinyin: Dōngbà Xiāng) is a township within Chaoyang District, Beijing, China. It is at the banks of Ba River, between the 5th and 6th Ring Roads of Beijing. It borders Cuigezhuang Township to the north, Jinzhan Township to the east, Pingfang and Changying Townships to the south, Dongfeng and Jiangtai Townships to the west. According to the 2020 Chinese census, the area had 124,163 inhabitants.

The name of the area Dongba (Chinese: 东坝; lit. 'East Dam') refers to a dam that used to be in the region. It was one of the seven dams constructed during Yuan dynasty.

== History ==
Timeline of Dongba Township
Year	Status
1953	Established as Dongba Township
1956	Converted to "Three-Eight" Production Cooperative
1961	Part of People's Commune of Sino-German Friendship
1983	Reorganized as a township
2003	Became an area while retaining township status

== Administrative Divisions ==
As of 2022, the area consists of 32 subdivisions, with 23 residential communities and 9 villages:

Administrative Division Code	Community Name in English	Community Name in Simplified Chinese	Type
110105039001	Gaoyangshu	高杨树	Community
110105039006	Hongsongyuan	红松园	Community
110105039007	Hongsongyuan Beili	红松园北里	Community
110105039011	Kangjingli	康静里	Community
110105039020	Dongba Jiayuan	东坝家园	Community
110105039021	Aolinpike Huayuan	奥林匹克花园	Community
110105039024	Chaoyang Xincheng	朝阳新城	Community
110105039025	Lifu Jiayuan	丽富嘉园	Community
110105039026	Changqingteng	常青藤	Community
110105039027	Jingheyuan	景和园	Community
110105039028	Dongzeyuan	东泽园	Community
110105039029	Yueheyuan	悦和园	Community
110105039030	Jinju Jiayuan Diyi	金驹家园第一	Community
110105039031	Jinju Jiayuan Di'er	金驹家园第二	Community
110105039032	Furun Siji	福润四季	Community
110105039033	Baxin Jiayuan	坝鑫家园	Community
110105039034	Chaoyang Xincheng Di'er	朝阳新城第二	Community
110105039035	Huijingyuan	汇景苑	Community
110105039036	Zhengcun	郑村	Community
110105039037	Fuyuan Diyi	福园第一	Community
110105039038	Runze	润泽	Community
110105039039	Dongwan	东湾	Community
110105039040	Fuyuan Di'er	福园第二	Community
110105039200	Qikeshu	七棵树	Village
110105039201	Dandian	单店	Village
110105039202	Xibeimen	西北门	Village
110105039203	Houjie	后街	Village
110105039204	Dongfengcun	东风村	Village
110105039205	Juzifang	驹子房	Village
110105039206	Sanchahe	三岔河	Village
110105039207	Jiaozhuangcun	焦庄村	Village
110105039208	Dongxiaojing	东晓景	Village

== See also ==
- List of township-level divisions of Beijing
