= Sunhe, Beijing =

Sunhe Township 孙河乡
- Township
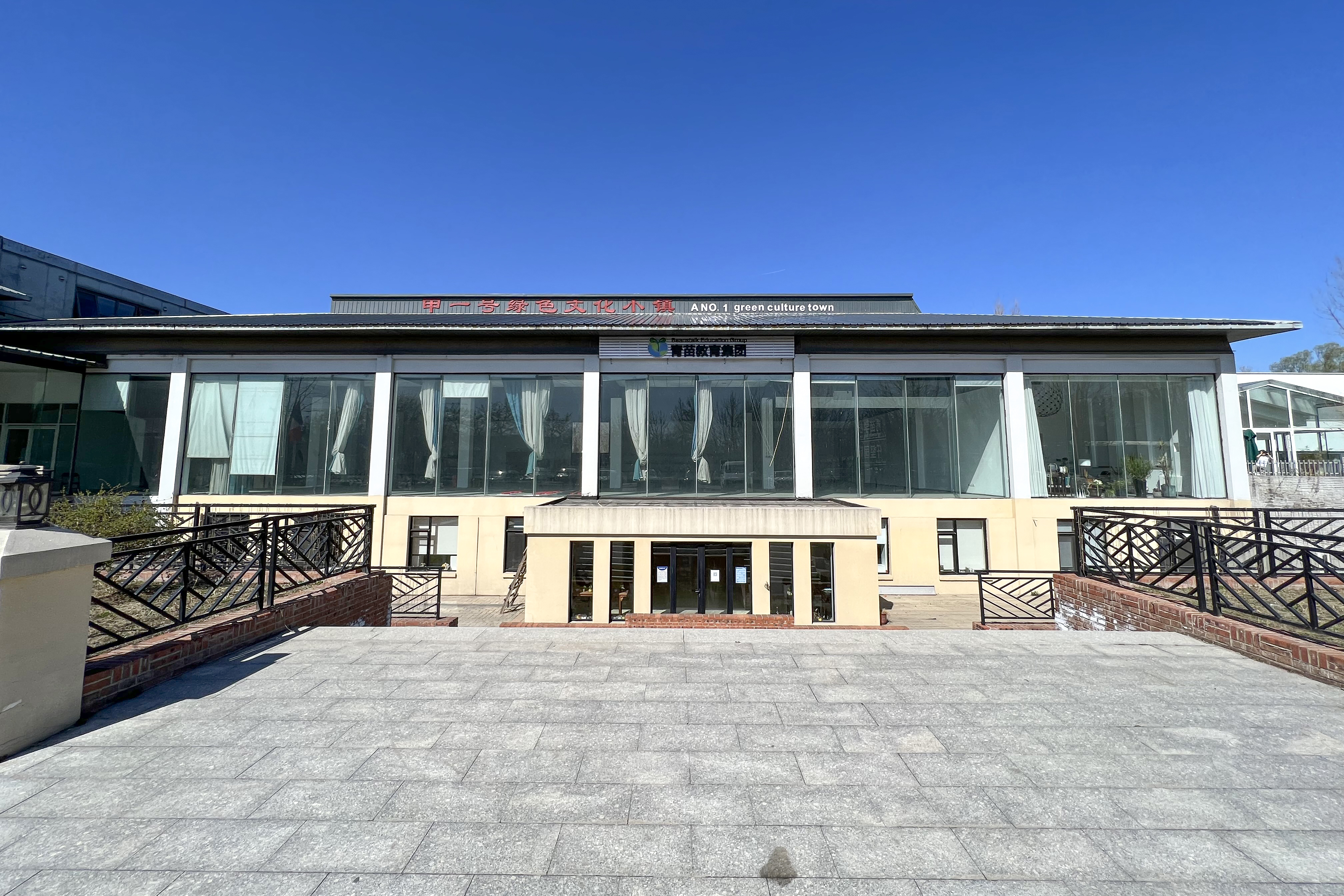
- Entrance of Cultural Town on the north of the township, 2022

- Location within Beijing Location within China
- Coordinates: 40°02′29″N 116°31′08″E
- Country: China
- Municipality: Beijing
- District: Chaoyang
- Village-level Divisions: 6 communities 13 villages

Area
  - Total: 35.26 km^{2} (13.61 sq mi)

Population (2020)
  - Total: 31,288
  - Density: 887.4/km^{2} (2,298/sq mi)
- Time zone: UTC+8 (China Standard)
- Postal code: 100102
- Area code: 010

Sunhe Township (Chinese: 孙河乡; pinyin: Sūnhé Xiāng) is a township located in the northwest of Chaoyang District, Beijing, China. It borders Konggang Subdistrict and Houshayu Township to the north, Tianzhu Township to the east, Cuigezhuang and Jinzhan Townships to the south, Laiguangying Township and Beiqijia Town to the west. As of the 2020 census, the area had a total population of 31,288.

This region used to be called Sunduitun, and was changed to Sunhecun (Chinese: 孙河村; lit. 'Sun River Village') in 1808, which later became the name of the whole township.

== History ==
History of Sunhe Township
Time	Status
1912	Part of Daxing County, Hebei
1948	Part of Changping County of Hebei and the 13th District of Beijing
1956	Part of Dongjiao District, Beijing
1958	Divided among people's communes of Heping, Chaoyang, Xingfu and Hongguang
1959	Formed its own commune, later changed to a production team
1984	Converted to Sunhe Township
2004	Incorporated Huanggang Township

== Administrative Divisions ==
As of 2021, Sunhe Township encompasses 19 subdivisions, in which 6 are communities and 13 are villages:

Administrative Division Code	Community Name in English	Community Name in Simplified Chinese	Type
110105037001	Kangying Jiayuanyi	康营家园一	Community
110105037002	Kangying Jiayuan'er	康营家园二	Community
110105037003	Kangying Jiayuansan	康营家园三	Community
110105037004	Kangying Jiayuansi	康营家园四	Community
110105037005	Xiaxinpu	下辛堡	Community
110105037006	Jingrunyuan	景润苑	Community
110105037200	Sunhe	孙河	Village
110105037203	Kangying	康营	Village
110105037204	Beidiandong	北甸东	Village
110105037205	Beidianxi	北甸西	Village
110105037206	Xidian	西甸	Village
110105037207	Xiaxinpu	下辛堡	Village
110105037208	Shangxinpu	上辛堡	Village
110105037209	Huanggang	黄港	Village
110105037210	Lixianfen	李县坟	Village
110105037211	Leiqiao	雷桥	Village
110105037212	Shenjiafen	沈家坟	Village
110105037213	Shaziying	沙子营	Village
110105037214	Weigou	苇沟	Village

== See also ==
- List of township-level divisions of Beijing
