= Donghu Subdistrict, Beijing =

Donghu Subdistrict 东湖街道
- Subdistrict
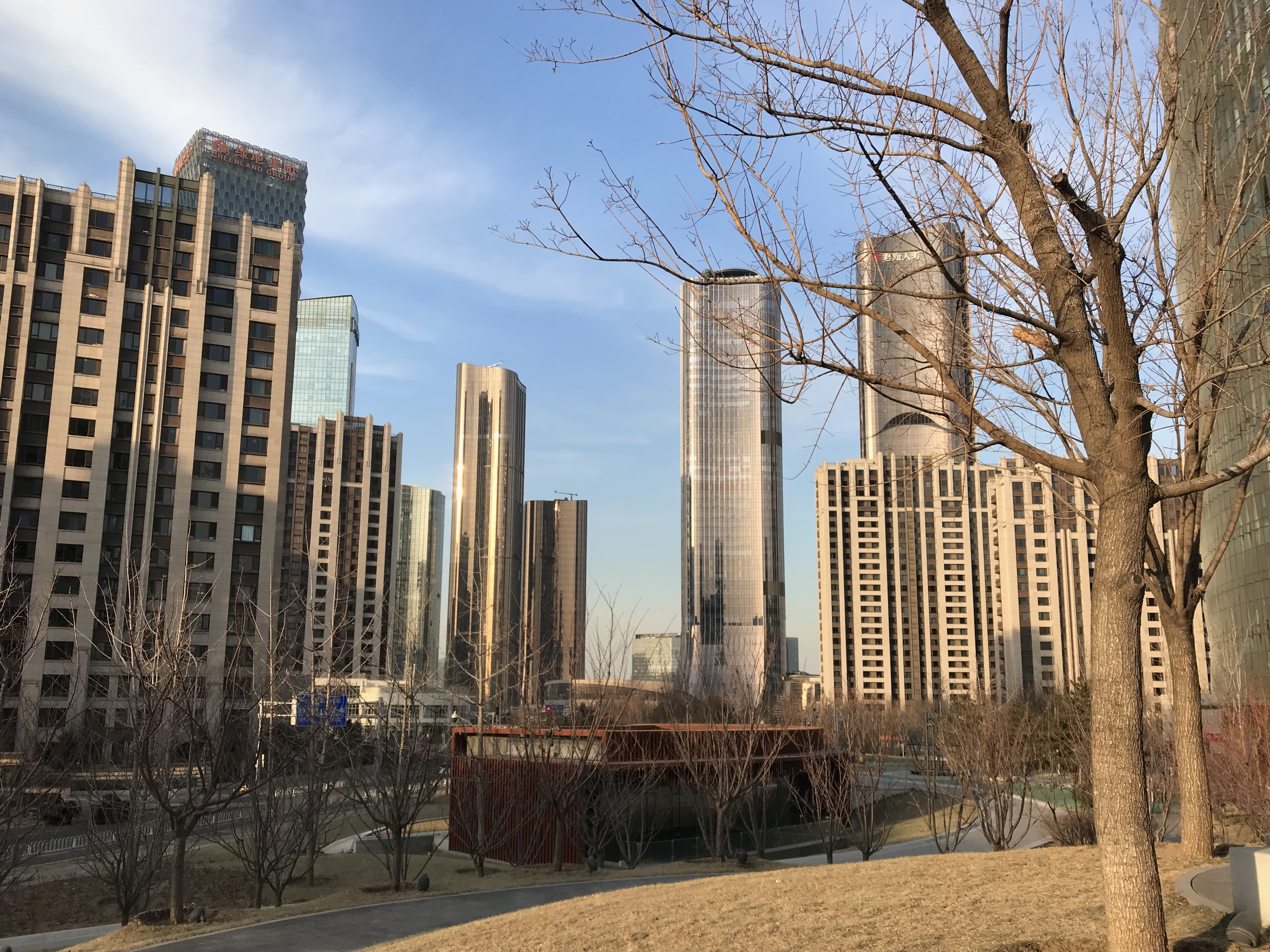
- Dawangjing Business District, located at the east end of Donghu Subdistrict

- Location within Beijing Location within China
- Coordinates: 39°59′29″N 116°27′48″E
- Country: China
- Municipality: Beijing
- District: Chaoyang
- Village-level Divisions: 14 communities

Area
  - Total: 5.1 km^{2} (2.0 sq mi)

Population (2020)
  - Total: 62,467
  - Density: 12,000/km^{2} (32,000/sq mi)
- Time zone: UTC+8 (China Standard)
- Postal code: 100102
- Area code: 010

Donghu Subdistrict (Chinese: 东湖街道; pinyin: Dōnghú Jiēdào) is a subdistrict on the northwestern part of Chaoyang District, Beijing, China. It borders Wangjing Subdistrict to the south, Laiguangying Area to the north and west, and Cuigezhuang Area to the east. As of 2020, its population was 62,467.

The subdistrict got its current name Donghu (Chinese: 东湖; lit. 'East Lake') due to the low-lying area on both banks of Beixiao River, where small pools and puddles will form during the rainy season.

== History ==
Donghu Subdistrict was established in 2014. It was made up of former parts of Laiguangying Area and Cuigezhuang Area.

== Administrative Division ==
As of the year 2022, there were a total of 14 communities under Donghu Subdistrict:

Administrative Division Code	Community Name in English	Community Name in Simplified Chinese
110105043001	Wangjing Xiyuan	望京西园
110105043002	Nanhu Dongyuanbei	南湖东园北
110105043003	Nanhu Zhongyuanbei	南湖中园北
110105043004	Wangjing Huayuan	望京花园
110105043005	Lize Xiyuan Yiqu	利泽西园一区
110105043006	Guolingli	果岭里
110105043007	Wanghu	望湖
110105043008	Dawangjing	大望京
110105043009	Donghuwan	东湖湾
110105043010	Wangjing Xiyuan Erqu	望京西园二区
110105043011	Wangjing Huayuan Dongqu	望京花园东区
110105043012	Kangdu Jiayuan	康都佳园
110105043014	Kangdu Jiayuan	华彩
110105043014	Kangdu Jiayuan	望馨花园

== Transportation ==
Donghu Subdistrict is currently served by two stations of Beijing Subway—Donghuqu station 14 , located alongside Guangshun North Avenue, and Wangjingdong station 15 , located at the intersection of Qiyang Road and Heyin East Road.

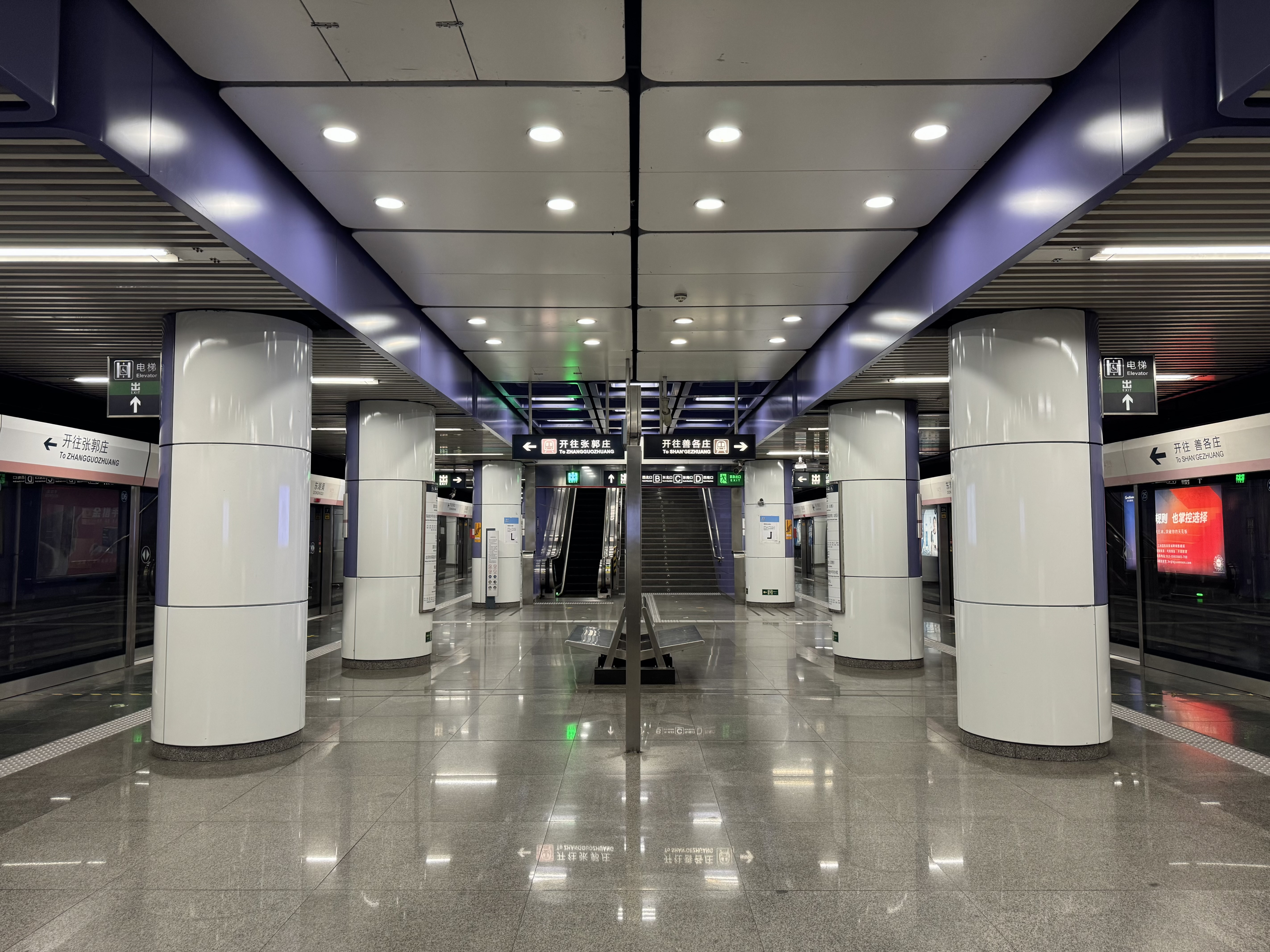
Donghuqu Station

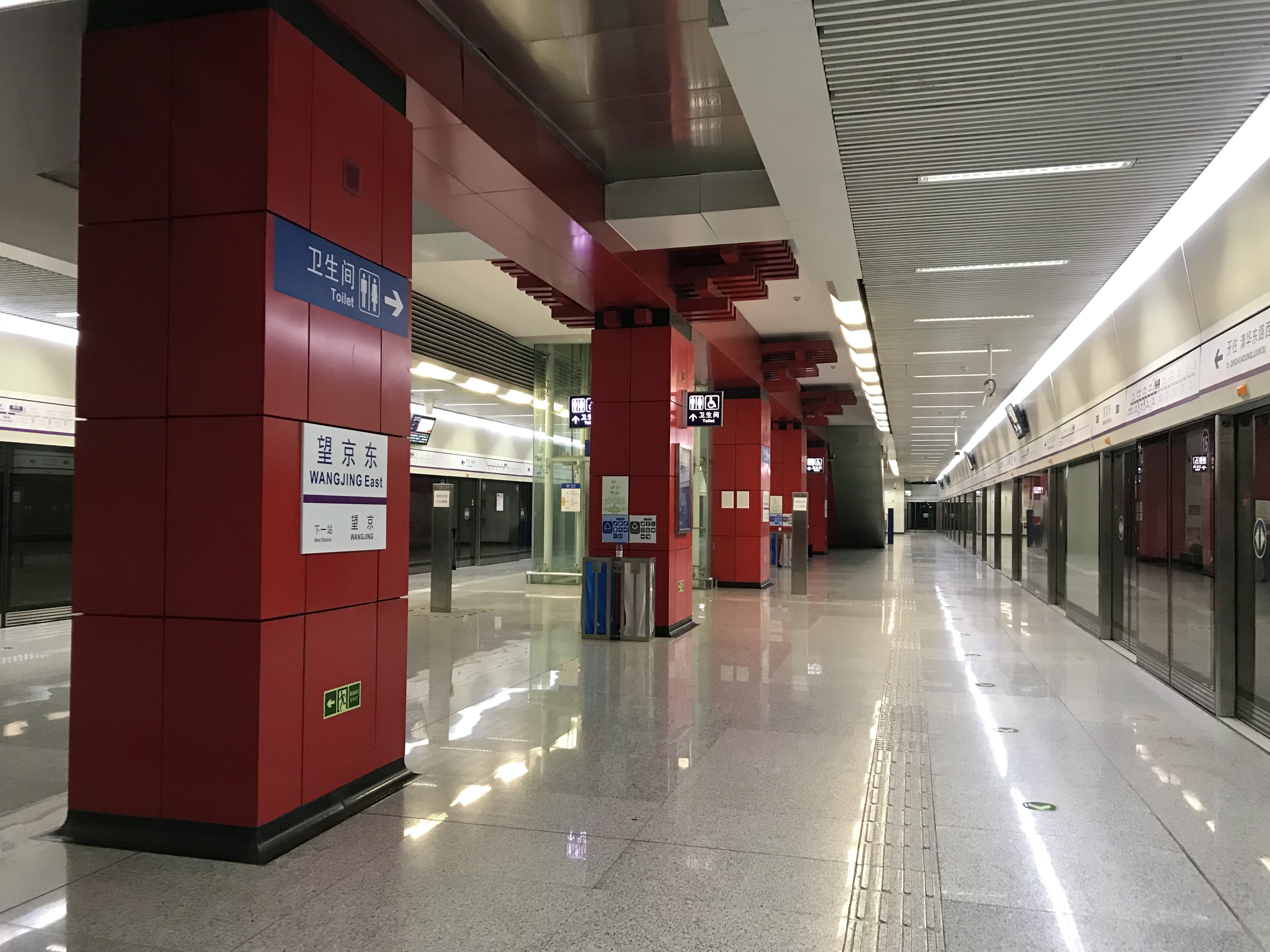
Wangjingdong Station
