= Jinzhan =

Jinzhan Township 金盏乡
- Township
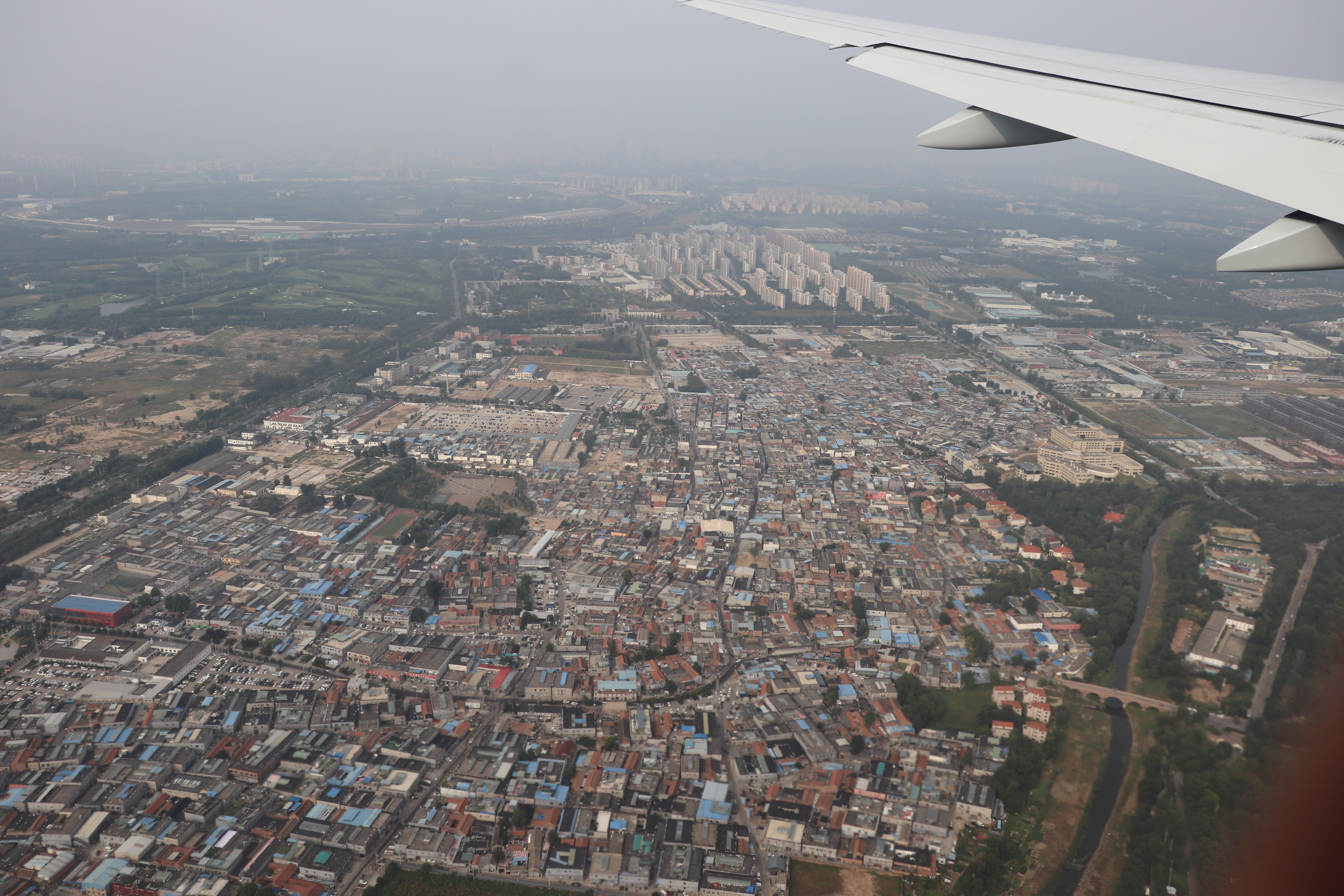
- Aerial view of Jinzhan, 2023

- Location within Beijing Location within China
- Coordinates: 40°00′07″N 116°33′47″E
- Country: China
- Municipality: Beijing
- District: Chaoyang
- Village-level Divisions: 6 communities 13 villages

Area
  - Total: 50.27 km^{2} (19.41 sq mi)

Population (2020)
  - Total: 82,756
  - Density: 1,646/km^{2} (4,264/sq mi)
- Time zone: UTC+8 (China Standard)
- Postal code: 100018
- Area code: 010

Jinzhan Township (Chinese: 金盏乡; pinyin: Jīnzhǎn Xiāng) is a township situated at northeastern corner of Chaoyang District, Beijing, China. It borders Sunhe and Tianzhu Townships to the north, Songzhuang Town to the east, Changying Township to the south, Dongba and Cuigezhuang Townships to the west. The township has a population of 82,756 as of 2020.

According to Tianfu Guangji (Chinese: 天府广记; lit. 'Extensive Record on Heavenly State') written during the Ming dynasty, the region was named Jinzhan (Chinese: 金盏; lit. 'Marigold') due to the flowers that grew on a local shallow lake and looked like marigolds.

== History ==
History of Jinzhan Township
| Year | Status |
|---|---|
| 1949 | Part of Tong County, Hebei |
| 1953 | Established as Jinzhan Township |
| 1956 | Transferred under Dongjiao District, Beijing |
| 1957 | Formed Jinzhan Production Team, Part of the 4th Management Station, People's Commune of Chaoyang |
| 1959 | Formed Jinzhan Management Station, Part of People's Commune of Sino-German Friendship |
| 1961 | Formed its own commune |
| 1983 | Reinstated as a township |
| 2004 | Incorporated Louzizhuang Township, became an area while retaining township status |

== Administrative Divisions ==
As of 2021, the area oversees 19 subdivisions, including 6 residential communities and 13 villages:

| Administrative Division Code | Community Name in Simplified Chinese | Community Name in English | Type |
|---|---|---|---|
| 110105036001 | 朝阳农场 | Chaoyang Nongchang | Community |
| 110105036003 | 楼梓庄 | Louzizhuang | Community |
| 110105036004 | 金泽家园 | Jinze Jiayuan | Community |
| 110105036005 | 金盏嘉园第一 | Jinzhan Jiayuan Diyi | Community |
| 110105036006 | 金盏嘉园第二 | Jinzhan Jiayuan Dier | Community |
| 110105036007 | 金泽家园北 | Jinze Jiayuanbei | Community |
| 110105036200 | 雷庄村 | Leizhuangcun | Village |
| 110105036201 | 东大队村 | Dongdaduicun | Village |
| 110105036202 | 西大队村 | Xidaduicun | Village |
| 110105036203 | 小店村 | Xiaodiancun | Village |
| 110105036204 | 长店村 | Changdiancun | Village |
| 110105036205 | 北马房村 | Beimafangcun | Village |
| 110105036206 | 楼梓庄 | Louzizhuang | Village |
| 110105036207 | 沙窝 | Shawo | Village |
| 110105036208 | 黎各庄 | Ligezhuang | Village |
| 110105036209 | 马各庄 | Magezhuang | Village |
| 110105036210 | 皮村 | Picun | Village |
| 110105036211 | 东窑 | Dongyao | Village |
| 110105036212 | 曹各庄 | Caogezhuang | Village |

== Gallery ==
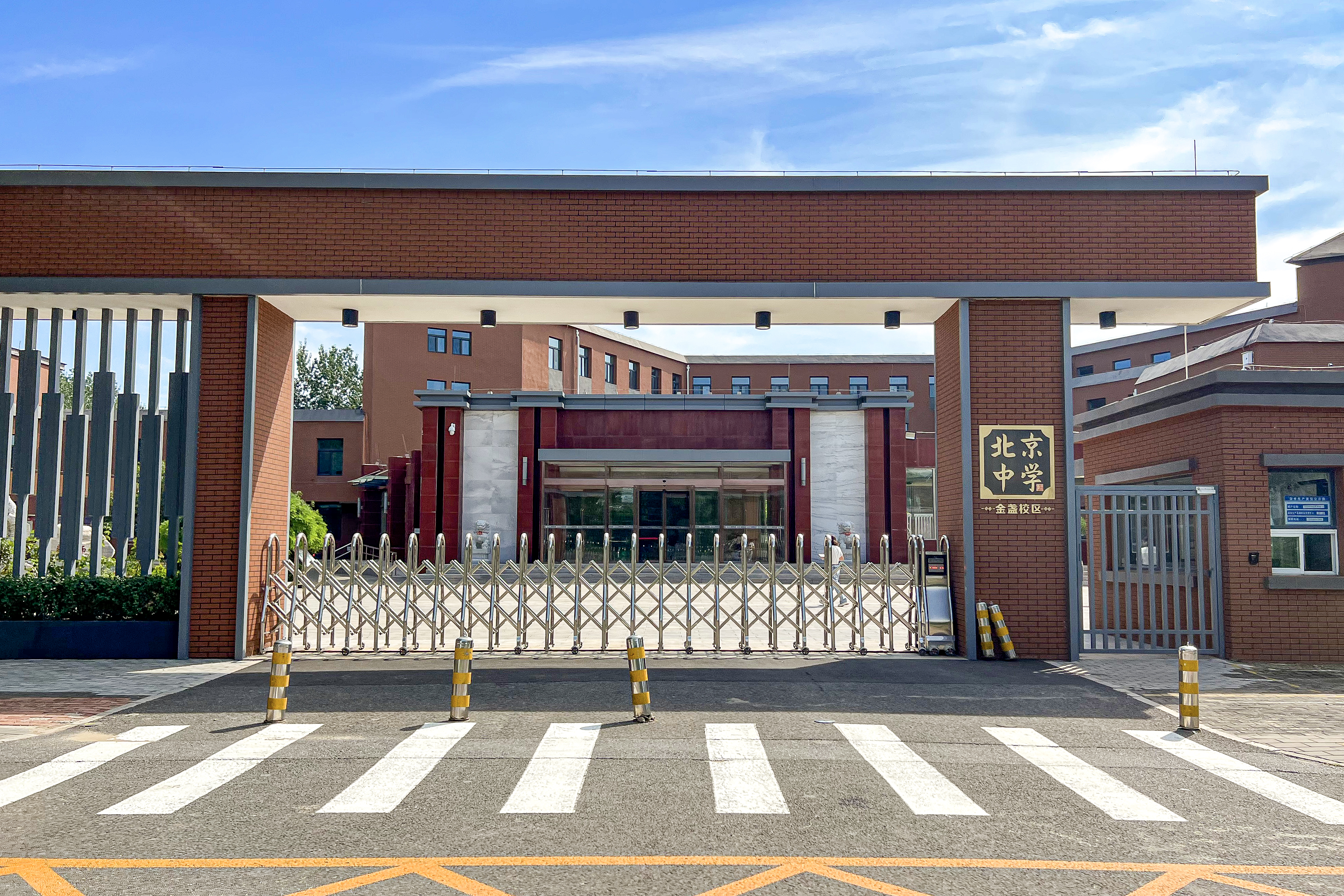
Beijing Academy Jinzhan Campus, 2023

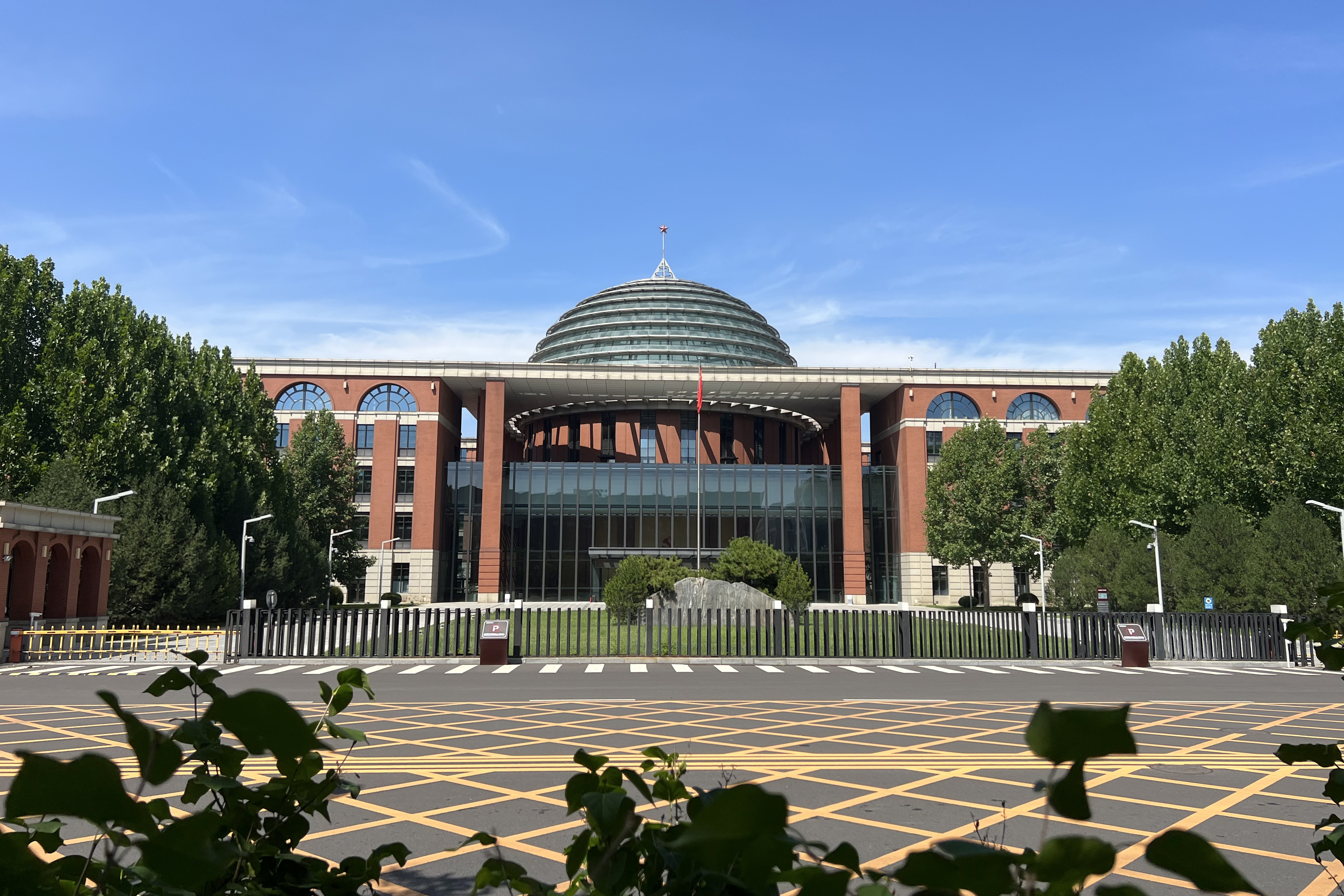
National Institute of Organization Administrators, 2023

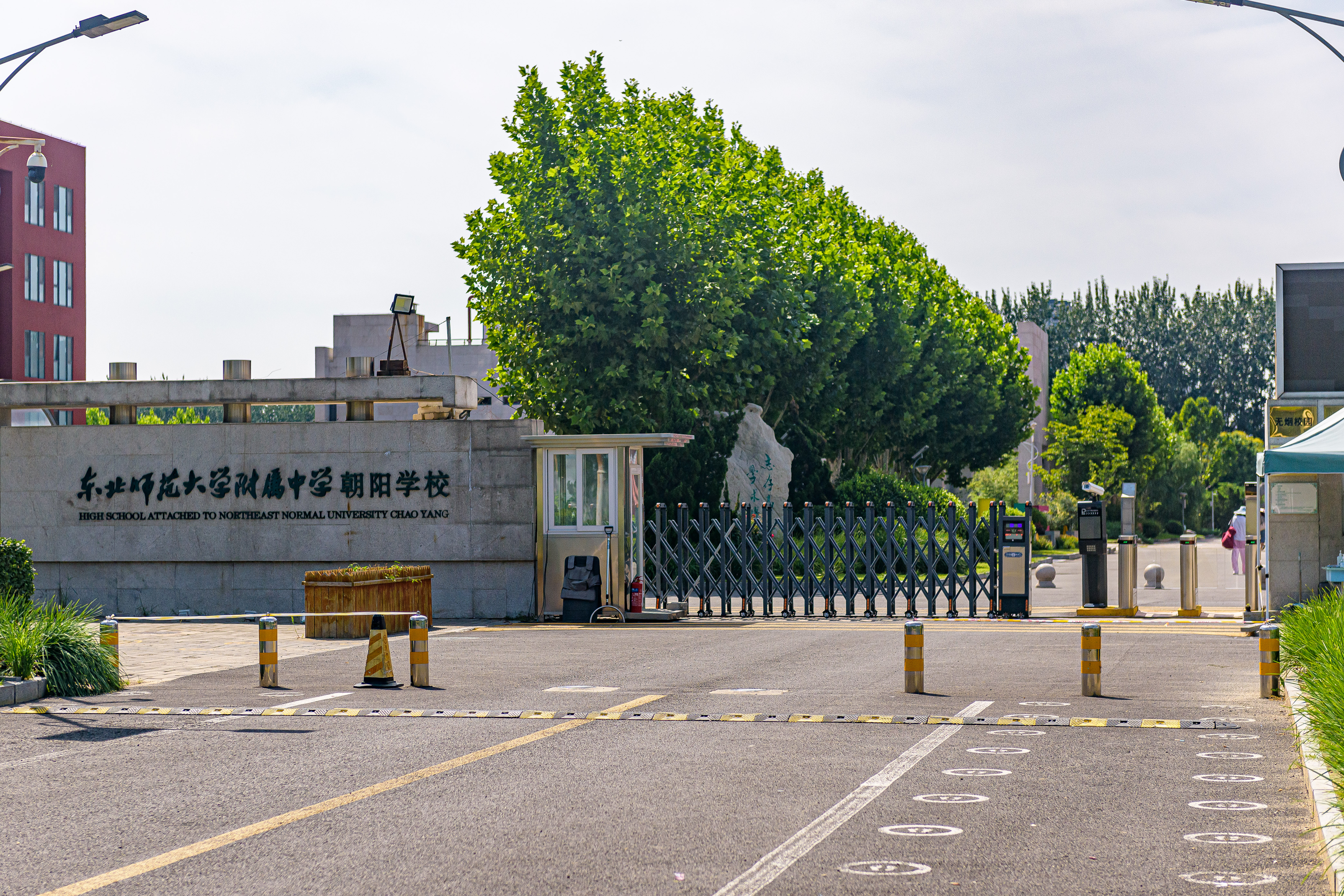
High School Attached to Northeast Normal University, Chaoyang, 2023

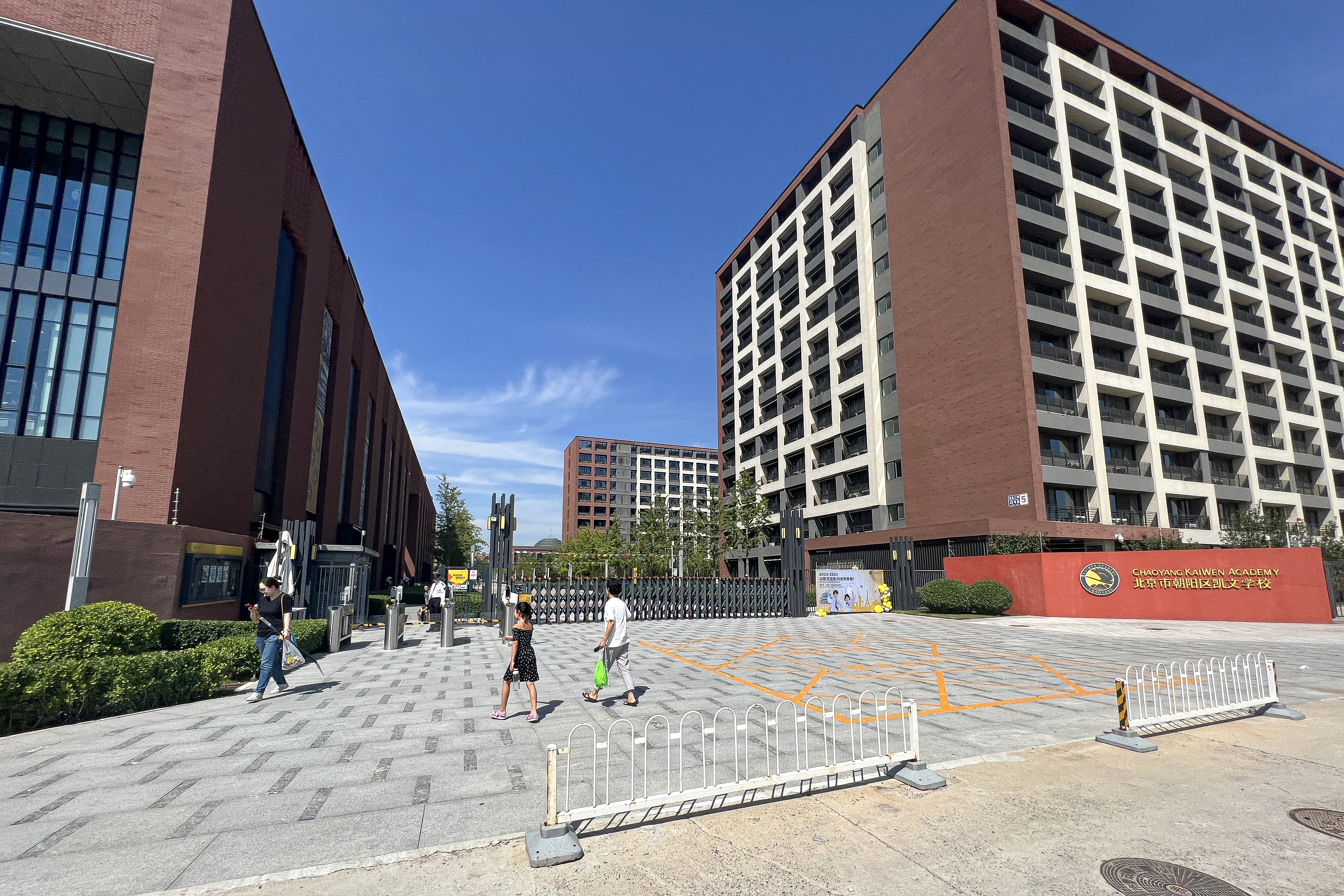
Chaoyang Kaiwen Academy, 2023

== See also ==
- List of township-level divisions of Beijing
