= Laiguangying =

Laiguangying Township 来广营乡
- Township
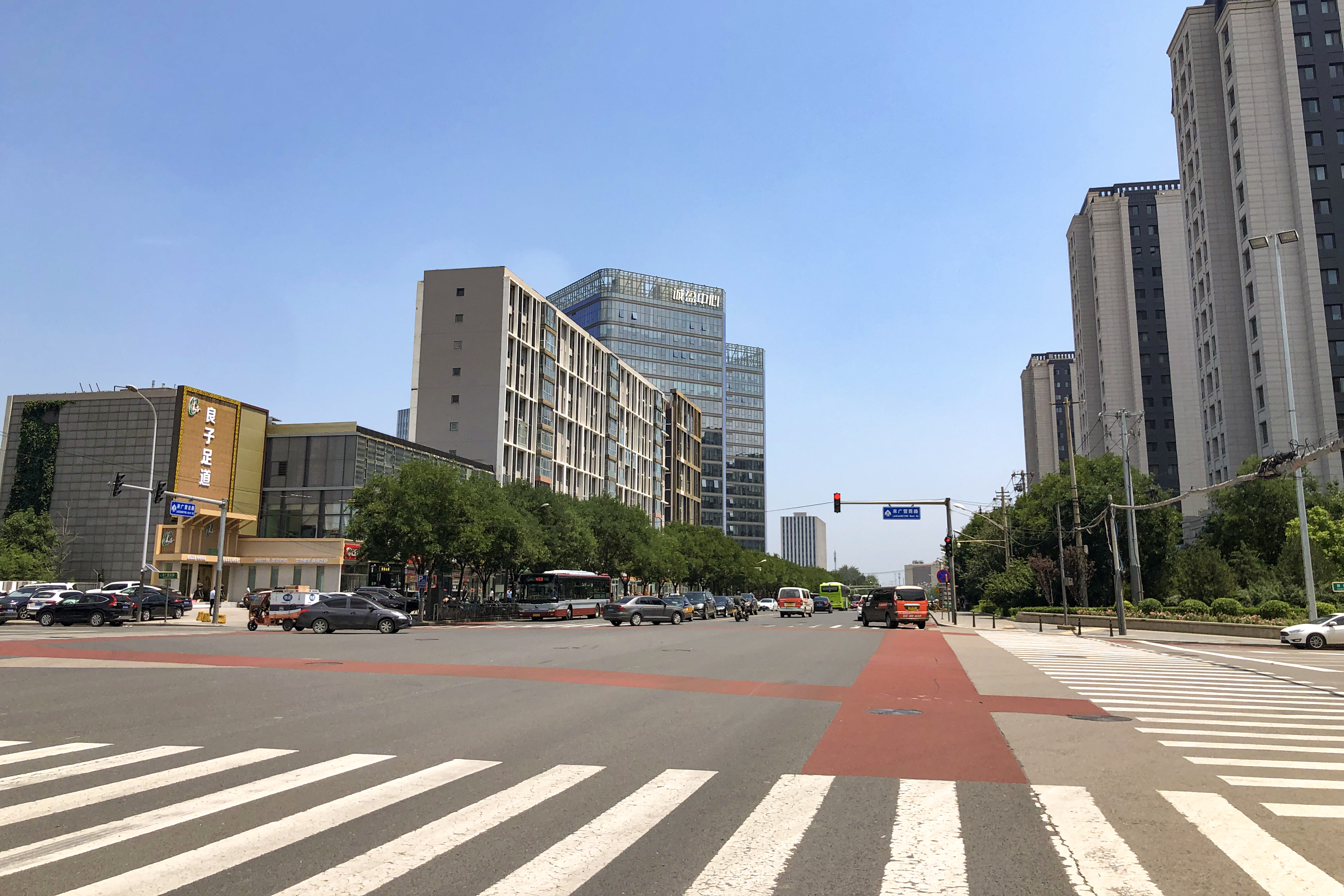
- An intersection on the center of the township, 2021

- Location within Beijing Location within China
- Coordinates: 40°02′30″N 116°25′23″E
- Country: China
- Municipality: Beijing
- District: Chaoyang
- Village-level Divisions: 29 communities 5 villages

Area
  - Total: 20.93 km^{2} (8.08 sq mi)

Population (2020)
  - Total: 163,970
  - Density: 7,834/km^{2} (20,290/sq mi)
- Time zone: UTC+8 (China Standard)
- Postal code: 100012
- Area code: 010

Laiguangying Township (Chinese: 来广营乡; pinyin: Láiguǎngyíng Xiāng) is a township on the northern part of Chaoyang District, Beijing, China. It borders Tiantongyuannan, Tiantongyuanbei Subdistricts and Beiqijia Town to the north, Sunhe and Cuigezhuang Townships to the east, Donghu and Datun Subdistricts to the south, Tiantongyuannan and Aoyuncun Subdistricts to the west. In the year 2020, it has a total population of 163,970.

This area was historically a barrack for the Plain Blue Banner troops of Qing dynasty, and was known as Lanying (Blue Barrack), which was later corrupted to Laiying. Its first appearance on record as Laiguangying was in 1908.

== History ==
Timeline of changes in the status of Laiguangying
Year	Status
1316	Known as Beihuqu, Part of Changping County, Zhongshu Sheng
1908	Known as Laiguangying Village
1949	Part of the 17th District of Beijiao District and Changping County
1950	Part of the 14th District of Beijiao District
1953	4 Townships were created: Laiguangying, Anjiafen, Wuhecun, Nanhuqu
1956	Incorporated into People's Commune of Heping, and the township status was revoked.
1983	Reorganized into a township
2003	Becoming an area while retaining township status

== Administrative Divisions ==
At the end of 2021, there are a total of 34 subdivisions under Laiguangying, in which 29 are communities and 5 are villages:

Administrative Division Code	Community Name in English	Community Name in Simplified Chinese	Type
110105032001	Xinjiefang	新街坊	Community
110105032009	Lichengyuan	立城苑	Community
110105032013	Beiyuan Yihaoyuan	北苑一号院	Community
110105032014	Beiyuan Erhaoyuan	北苑二号院	Community
110105032015	Beiyuan Sanhaoyuan	北苑三号院	Community
110105032016	Beiyuan Jiayuan Qingyouyuan	北苑家园清友园	Community
110105032017	Beiyuan Jiayuan Xiujuyuan	北苑家园绣菊园	Community
110105032018	Beiyuan Jiayuan Zishouyuan	北苑家园紫绶园	Community
110105032019	Chaolai Lüse Jiayuan	朝来绿色家园	Community
110105032020	Shidai Zhuangyuan	时代庄园	Community
110105032021	Qingniancheng	青年城	Community
110105032022	Lianpayuan	莲葩园	Community
110105032023	Moliyuan	茉藜园	Community
110105032024	Huangjinyuan	黄金苑	Community
110105032025	Liqinglu Diyi	立清路第一	Community
110105032026	Guangdalu	广达路	Community
110105032027	Qingyuanlu Diyi	清苑路第一	Community
110105032028	Hongjunying	红军营	Community
110105032029	Beiwei Jiayuan	北卫家园	Community
110105032030	Qingheying Zhonglu	清河营中路	Community
110105032031	Qingyuanlu Di'er	清苑路第二	Community
110105032032	Qingyuanlu Disan	清苑路第三	Community
110105032033	Beiyuan	北苑	Community
110105032034	Qingyuanlu Disi	清苑路第四	Community
110105032035	Chaolai Lüse Jiayuandong	朝来绿色家园东	Community
110105032036	Zhuhuanian	筑华年	Community
110105032037	Liqinglu Di'er	立清路第二	Community
110105032038	Qingyuanlu Diwu	清苑路第五	Community
110105032039	Guangshun	广顺	Community
110105032201	Hongjunying	红军营	Village
110105032202	Beihuqu	北湖渠	Village
110105032203	Laiguangying	来广营	Village
110105032204	Xinsheng	新生	Village
110105032205	Qingheying	清河营	Village

== See also ==
- List of township-level divisions of Beijing
