= Xibahe station =

Beijing Subway Line 12 and Line 17 station

Xibahe 西坝河
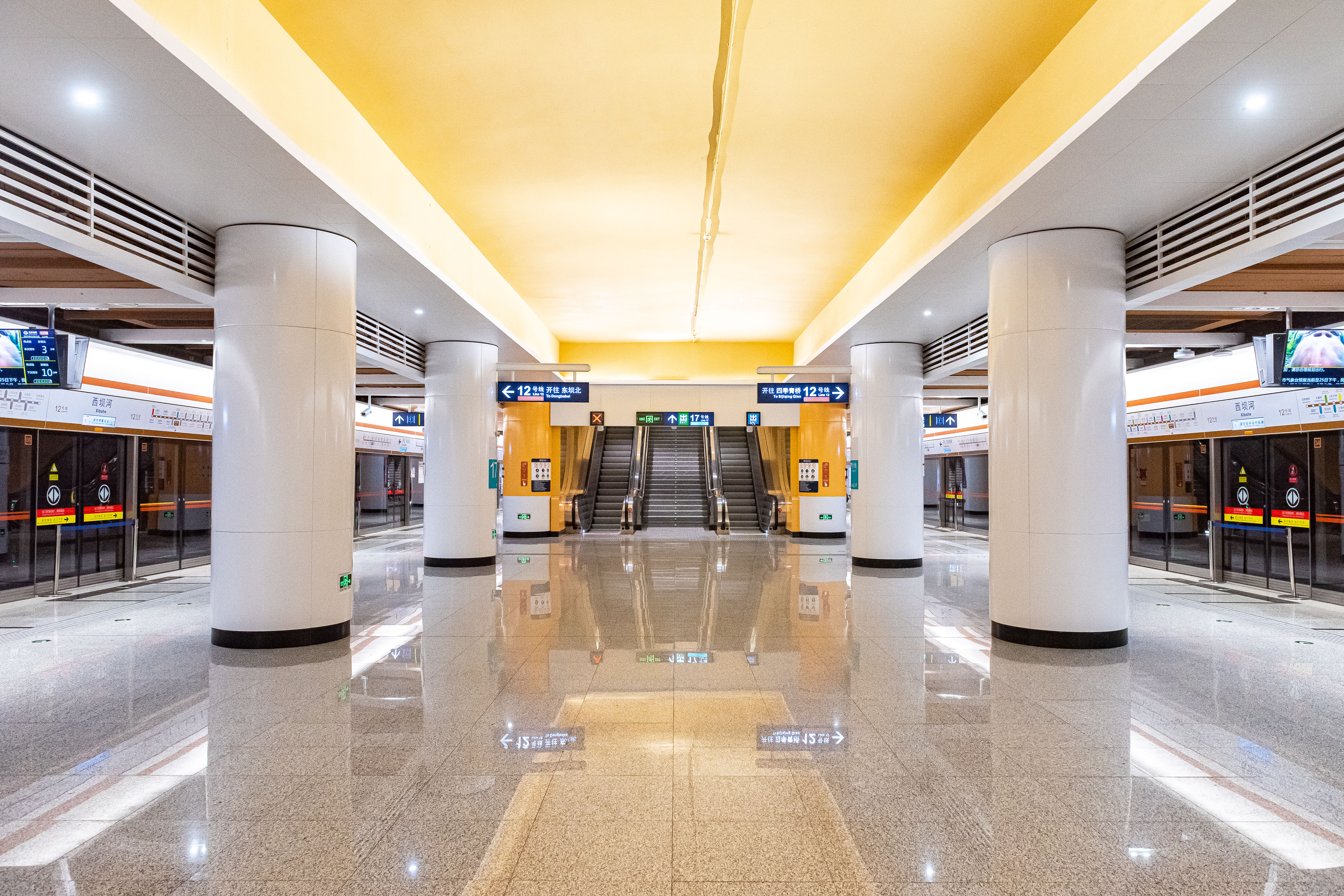
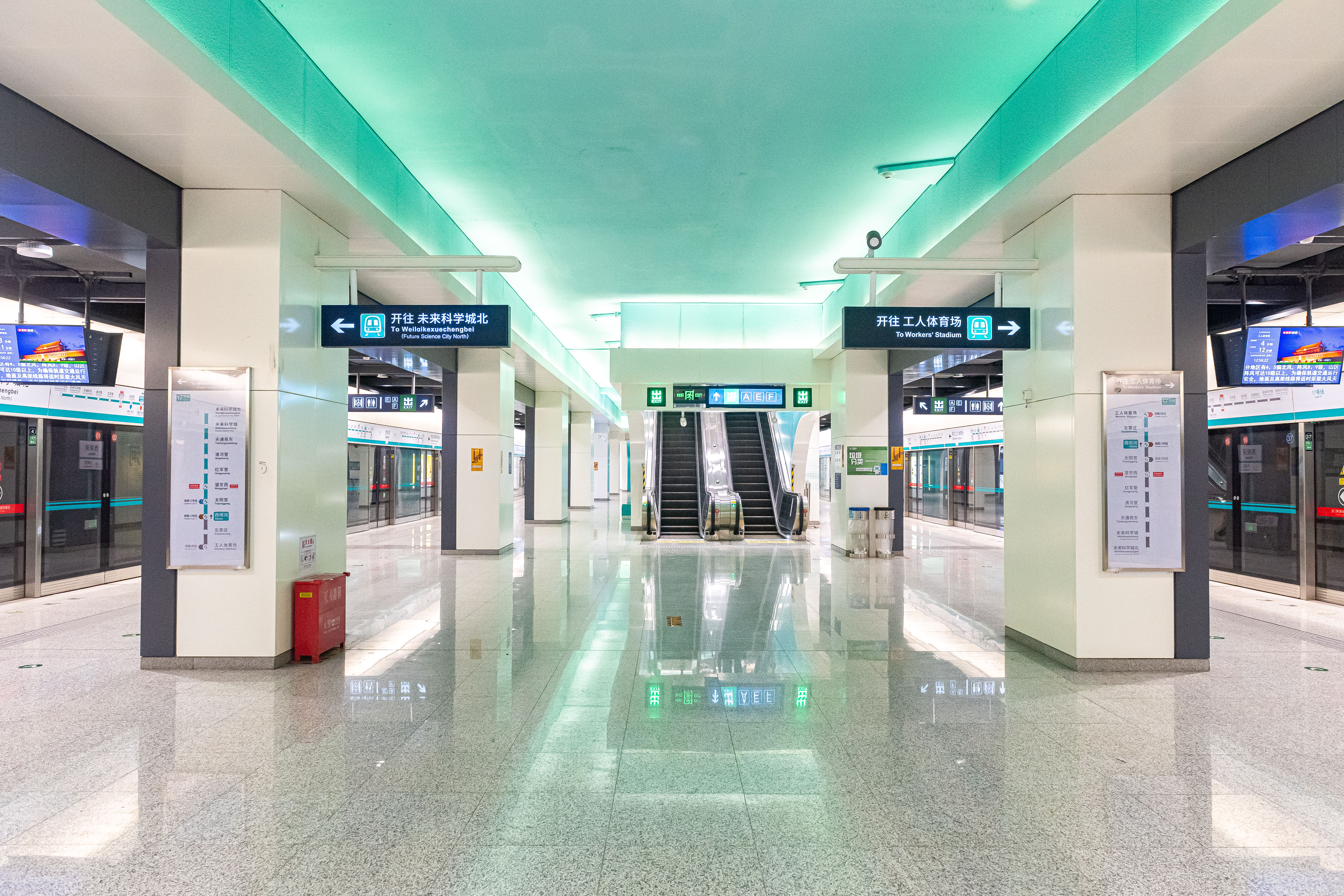
- Line 12 platform Line 17 platform

General information
- Location: Xibahe Bridge; Intersection between North 3rd Ring Road East (北三环东路) and Xibahe South Road (西坝河南路); On the border between Taiyanggong Area and Xiangheyuan Subdistrict, Chaoyang District, Beijing; China
- Coordinates: 39.965102°N 116.434989°E
- Operator: Beijing Mass Transit Railway Operation Corporation Limited (Line 12); Beijing MTR (Line 17)
- Lines: Line 12; Line 17
- Platforms: 4 (2 island platforms)
- Tracks: 4

Construction
- Structure type: Underground
- Accessible: Yes

History
- Opened: Line 17: December 30, 2023; 2 years ago; Line 12: December 15, 2024; 20 months ago

Services
Preceding station	Beijing Subway	Following station
Guangxi Men towards Sijiqing Qiao	Line 12	Sanyuan Qiao towards Dongbabei
Taiyanggong towards Weilaikexuechengbei (Future Science City North)	Line 17	Zuojiazhuang towards Jiahuihu
Location
- Location within Beijing

Xibahe station (Chinese: 西坝河站; pinyin: Xībàhé Zhàn) is an interchange station between Line 12 and Line 17 of Beijing Subway. The Line 17 station opened on December 30, 2023, and the Line 12 station opened on December 15, 2024.

== Location ==
The station is located under Xibahe Bridge, the interchange between North 3rd Ring Road East (北三环东路) and Xibahe South Road (西坝河南路), on the border between Taiyanggong Area and Xiangheyuan Subdistrict, in Chaoyang District, Beijing.

== Station layout ==
The station has underground island platforms for both Line 12 and Line 17.

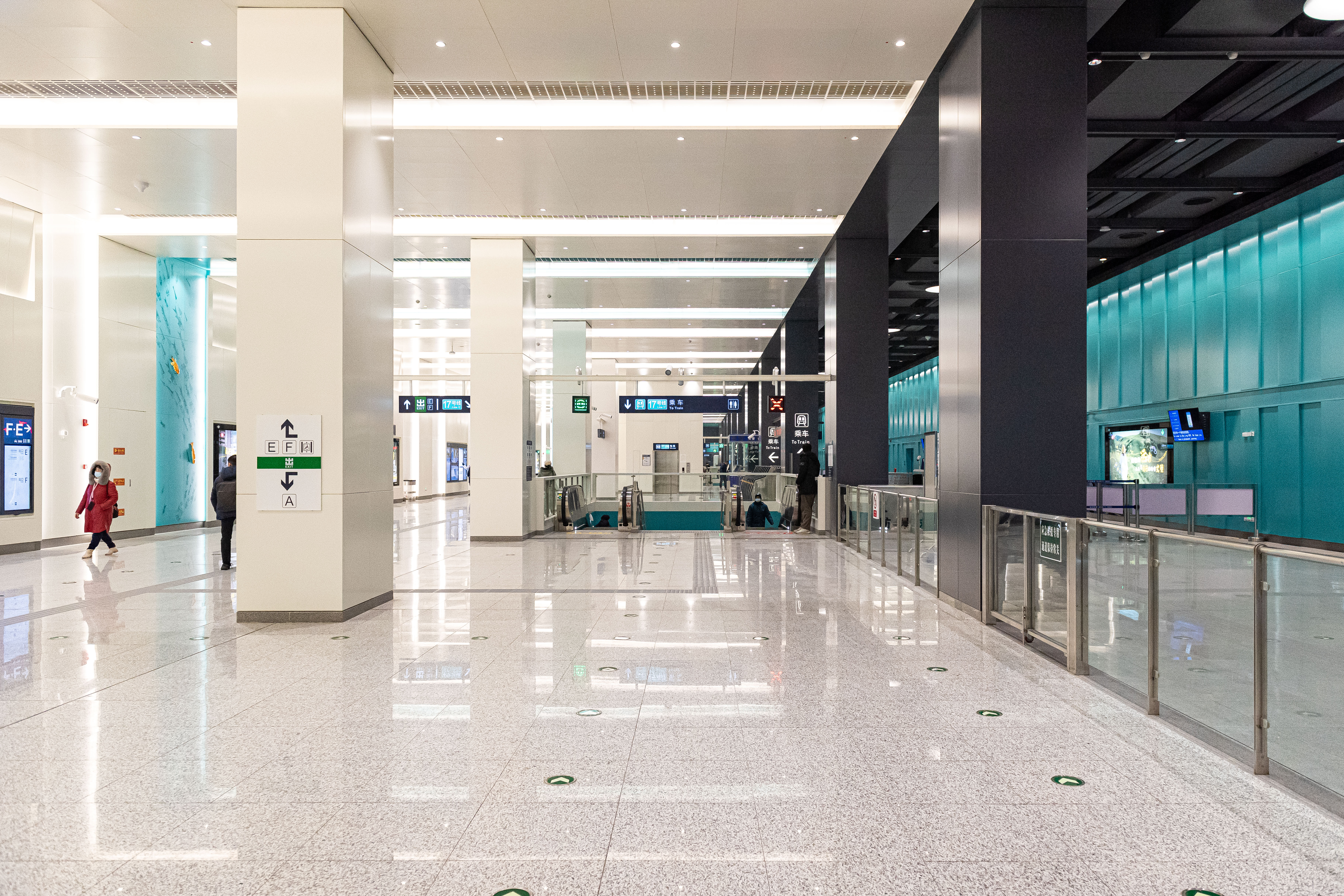
Line 17 concourse

== Exits ==
There are 7 exits, lettered A, B, C, D, E, F_{1} and F_{2}. Exits C and D lead to North 3rd Ring Road East, all others lead to Xibahe South Road. Exits B, D and E have accessible elevators.

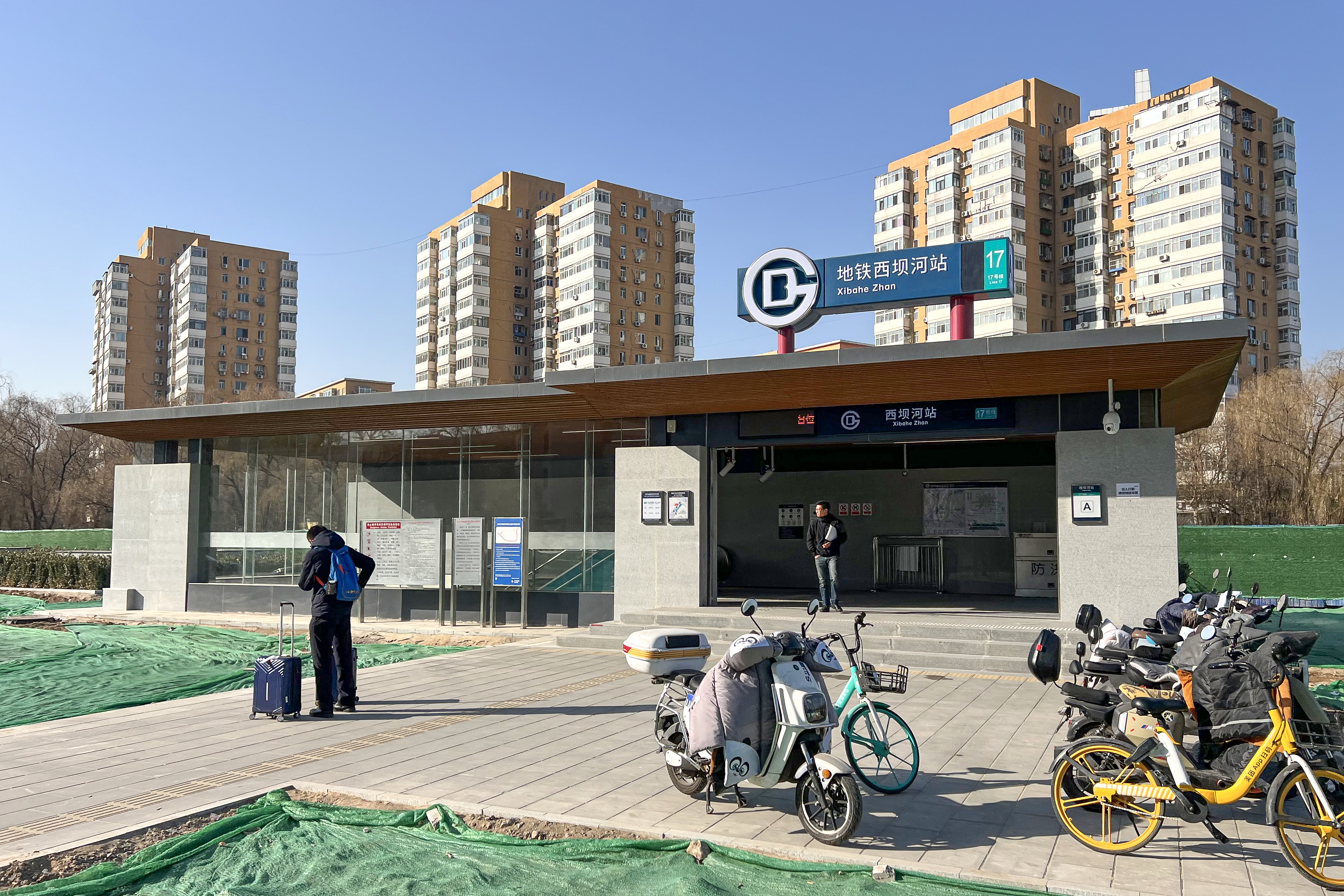
Exit A, Line 17

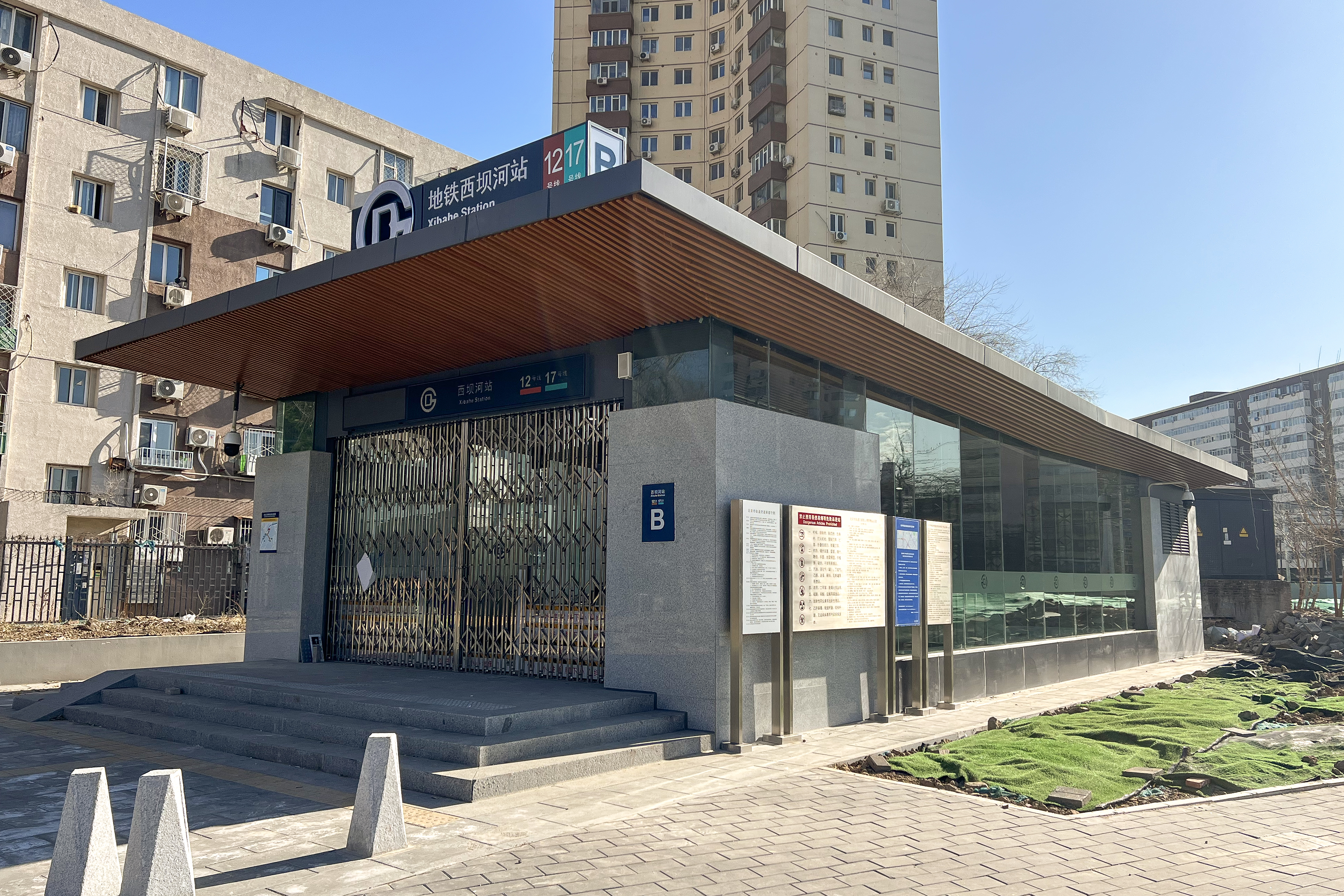
Exit B, Line 12

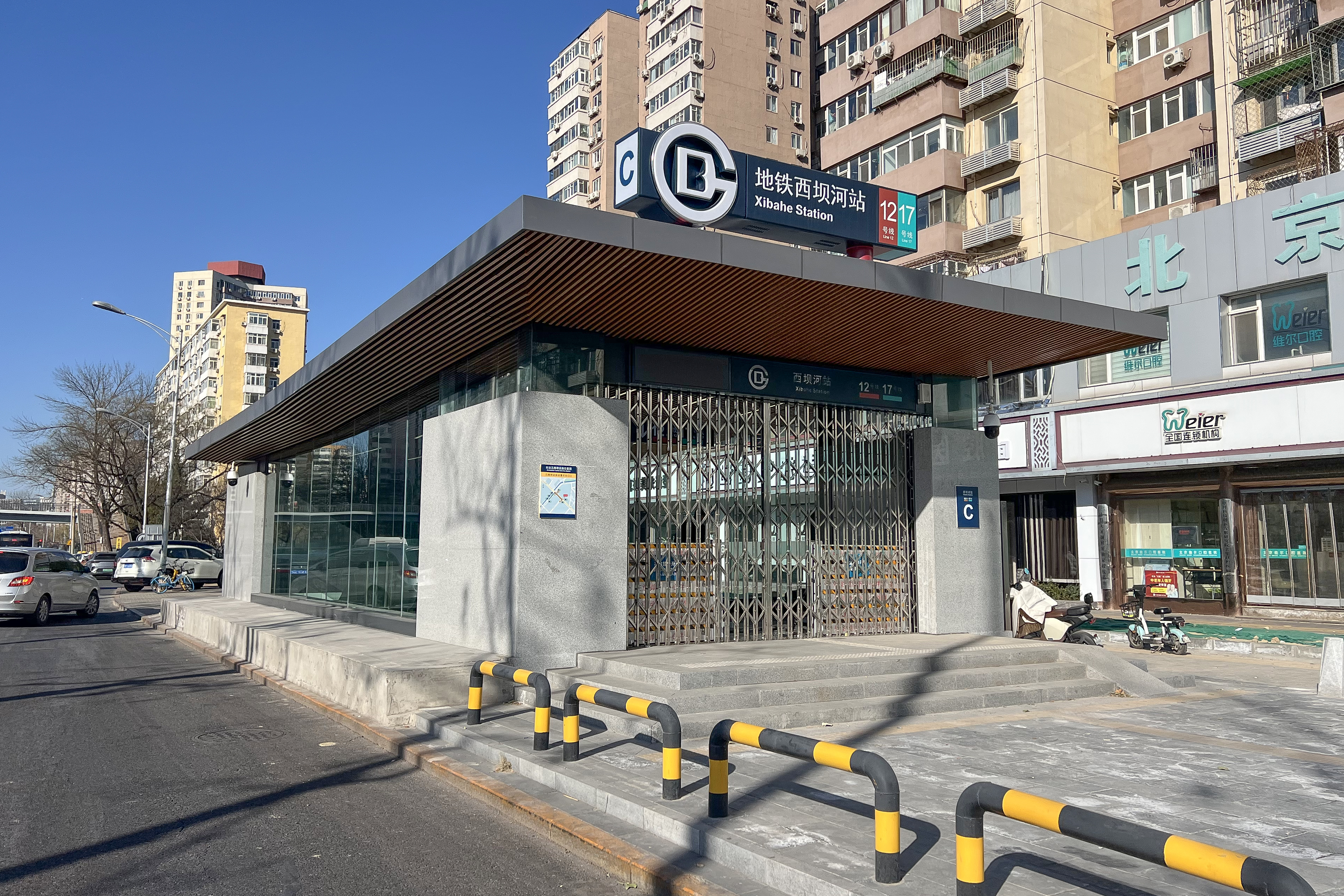
Exit C, Line 12

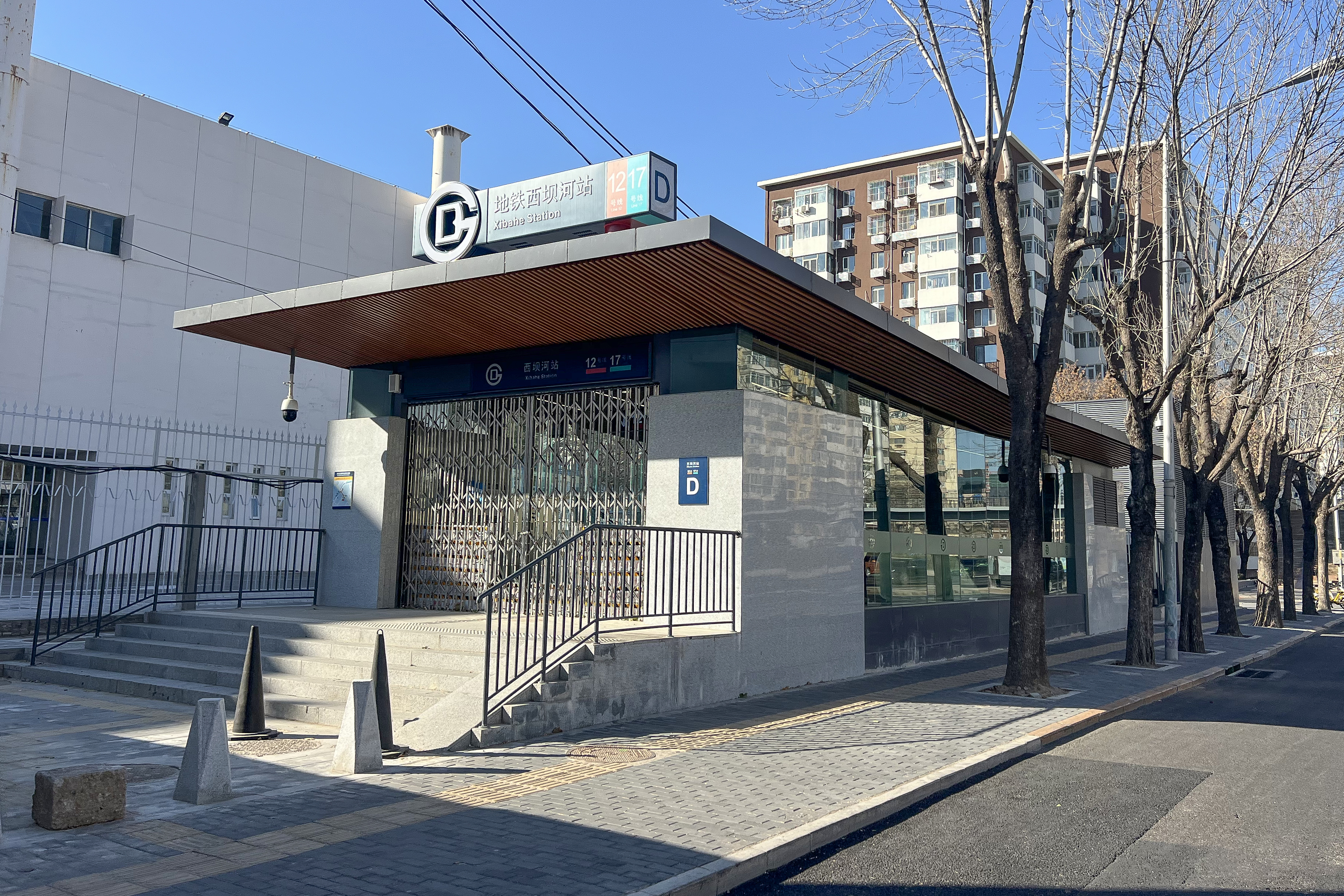
Exit D, Line 17

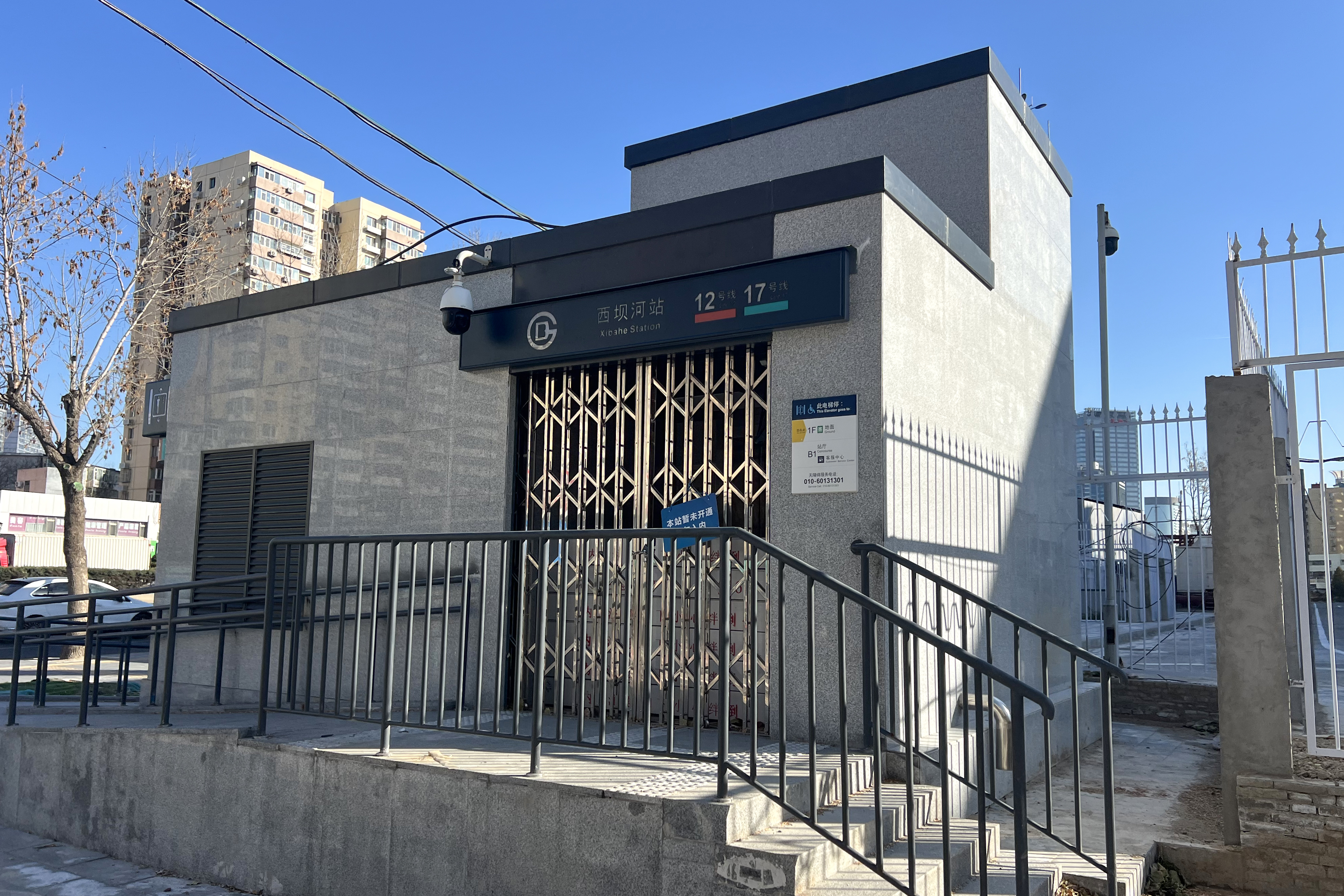
Exit D accessible exit

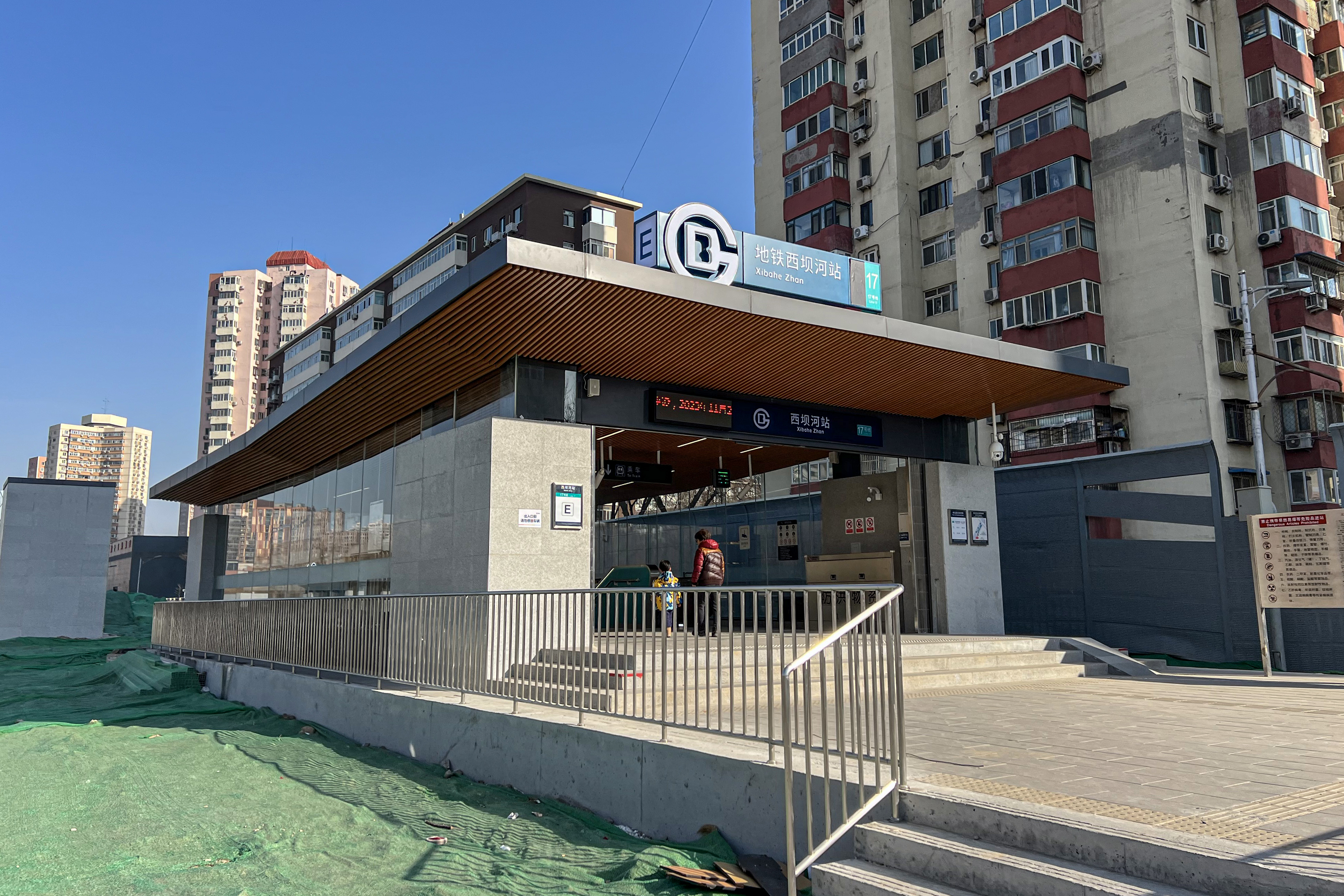
Exit E, Line 17

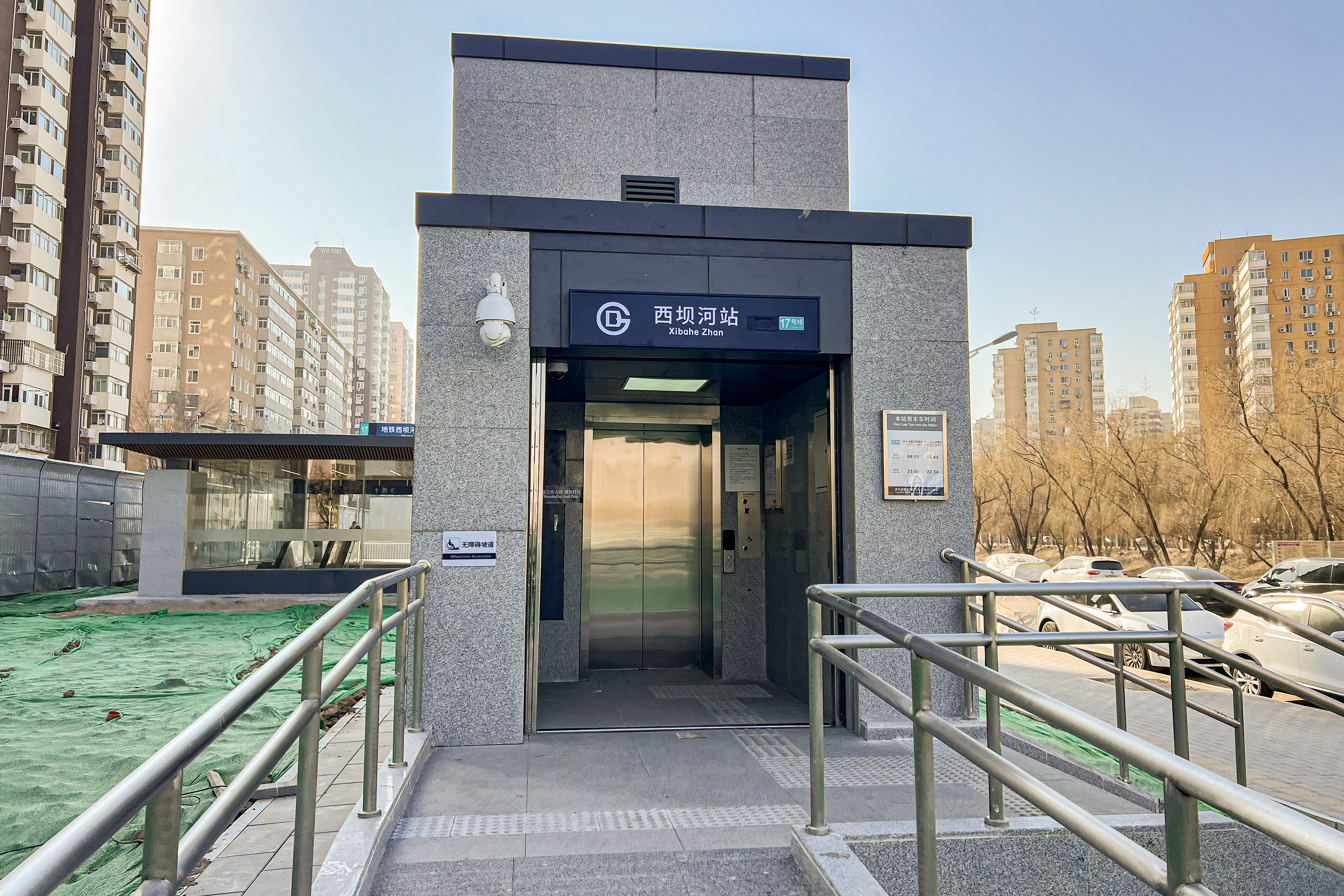
Exit E accessible exit

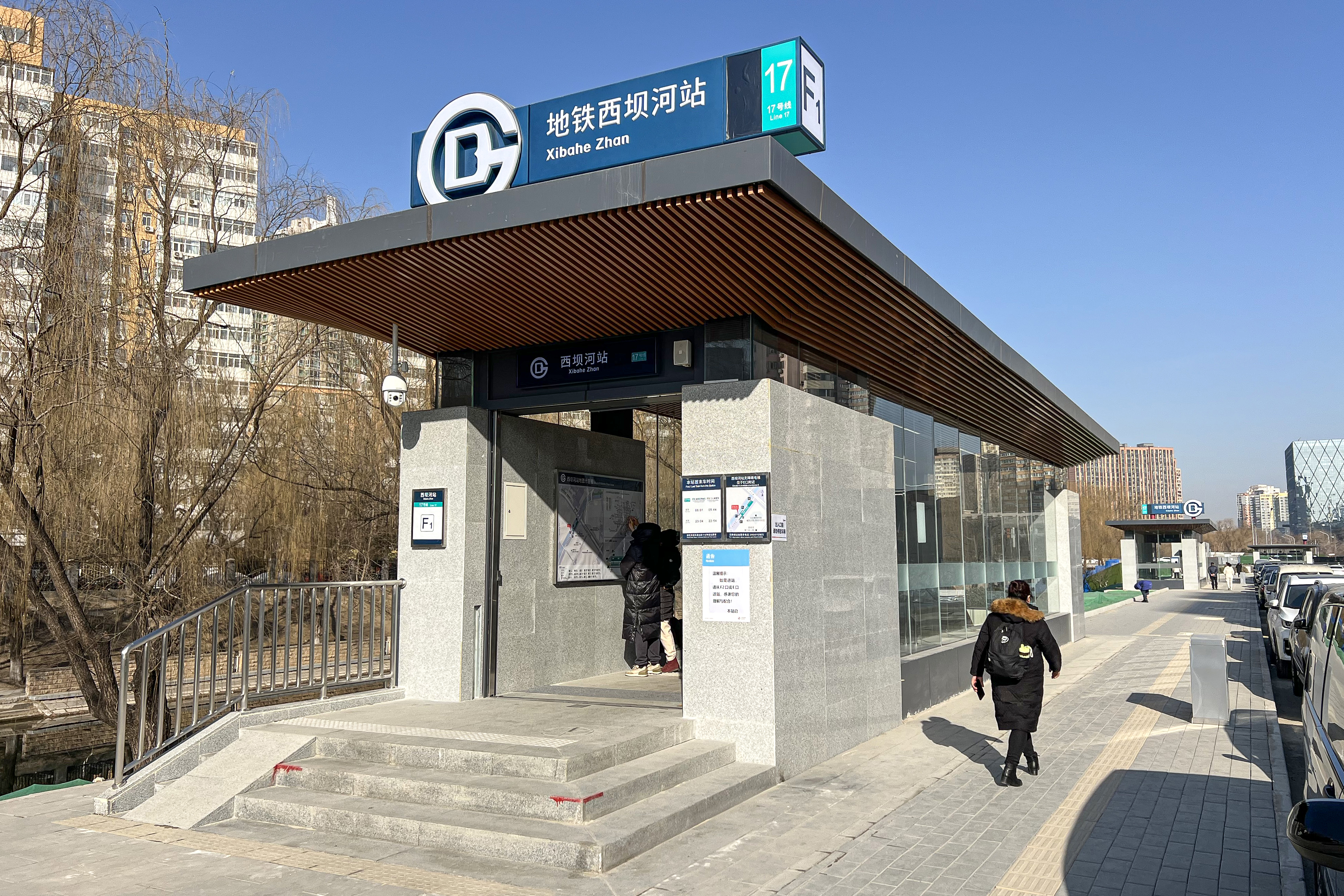
Exit F1

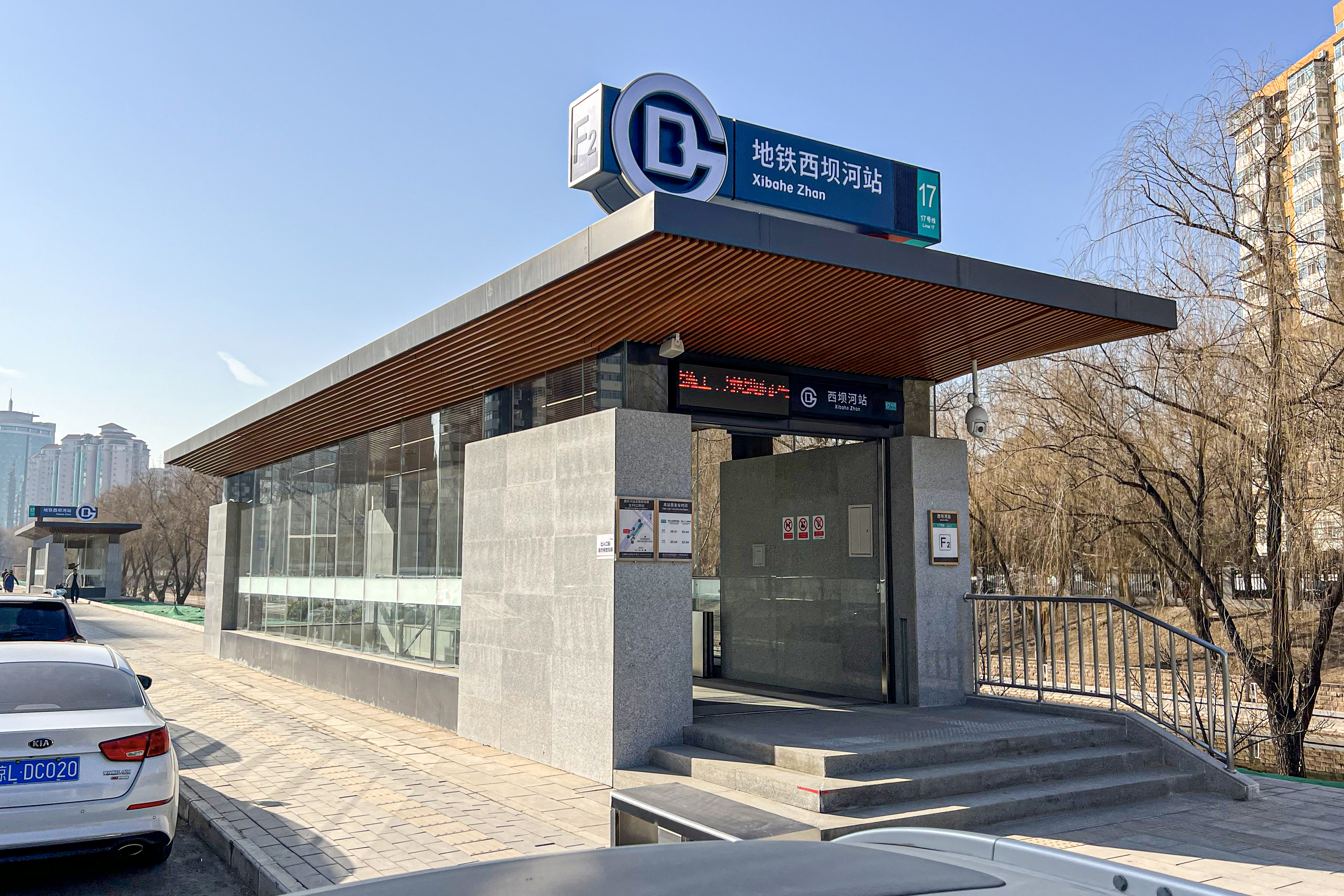
Exit F2
