= Zuojiazhuang station =

Beijing Subway Line 17 station

Zuojiazhuang 左家庄
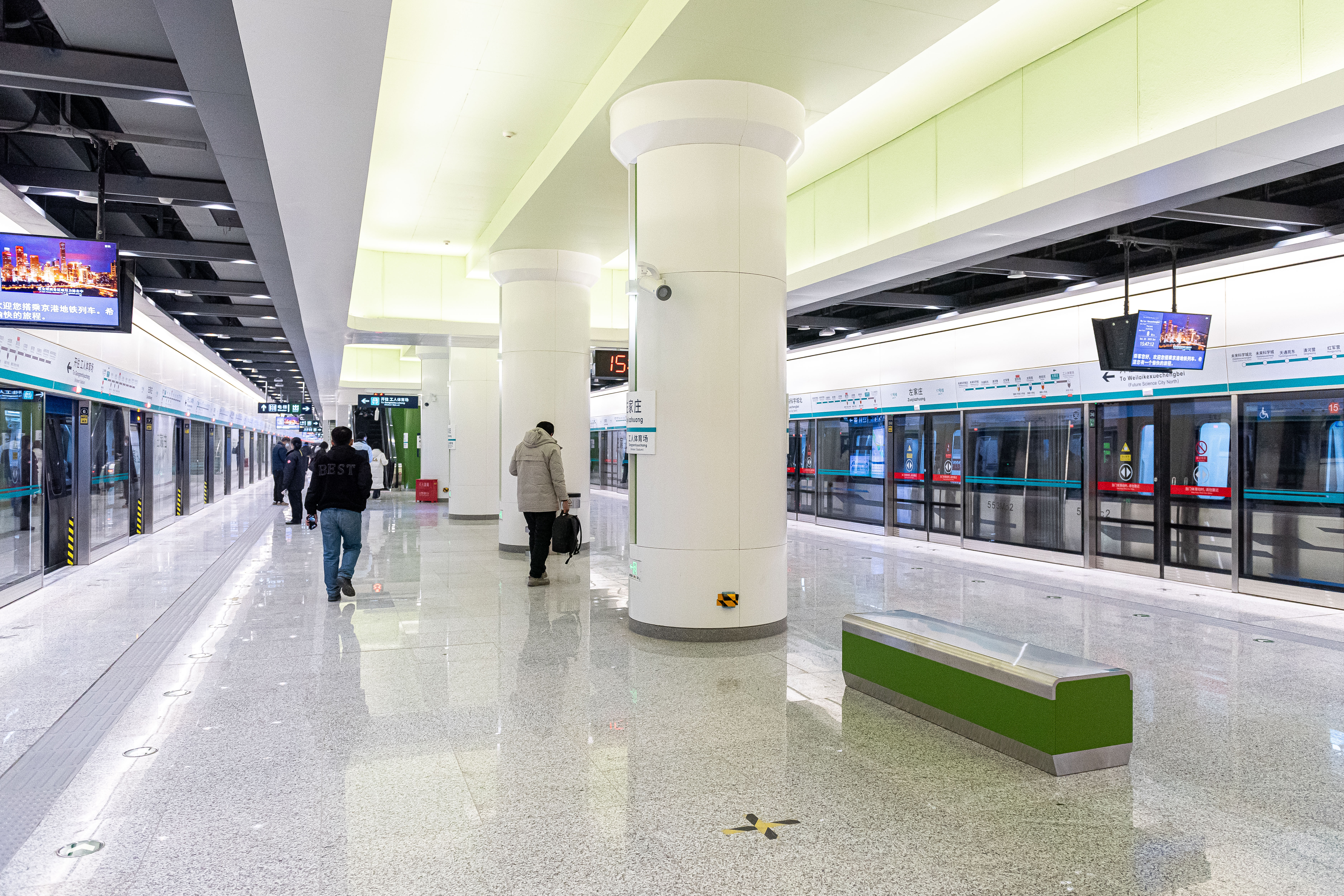
- Platform

General information
- Location: Interchange between Xiangheyuan Bridge and Xiangheyuan Road; Zuojiazhuang Subdistrict, Chaoyang, Beijing; People's Republic of China
- Coordinates: 39.94797°N 116.43641°E
- Operator: Beijing MTR
- Line: Line 17
- Platforms: 2 (1 island platform)
- Tracks: 2

Construction
- Structure type: Underground
- Accessible: Yes

History
- Opened: December 30, 2023; 2 years ago
- Former names: Xiangheyuan

Services
Preceding station	Beijing Subway	Following station
Xibahe towards Weilaikexuechengbei (Future Science City North)	Line 17	Workers' Stadium towards Jiahuihu
Location
- Location within Beijing

Zuojiazhuang station (Chinese: 左家庄站; pinyin: Zuǒjiāzhuāng Zhàn) is a station on the Line 17 of Beijing Subway. It opened on December 30, 2023.

== Location ==
The station is located under the interchange between Xiangheyuan Bridge and Xiangheyuan Road, in Zuojiazhuang Subdistrict, where the name of the station comes from, in Chaoyang District, Beijing.

== Station layout ==
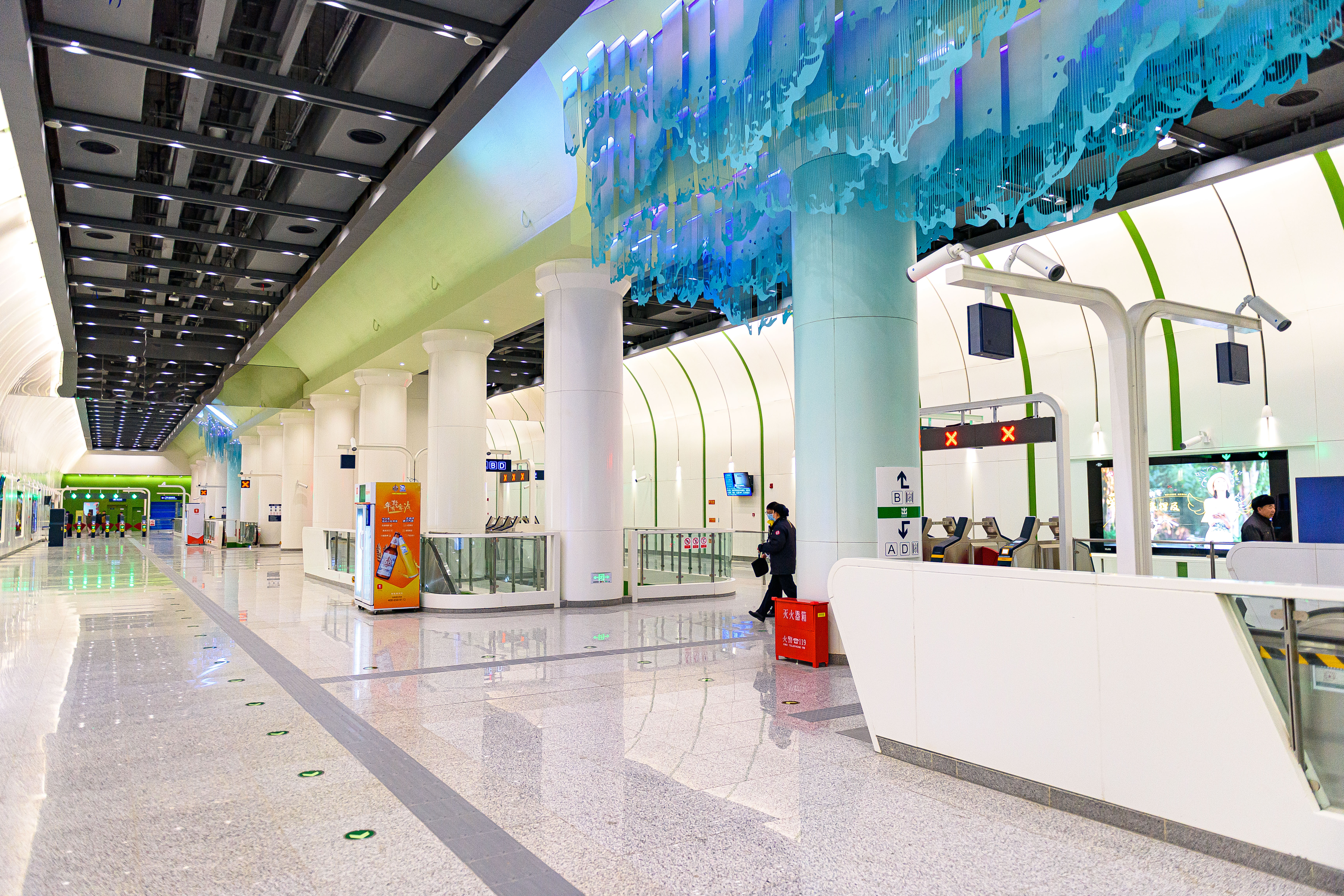
Concourse

The total construction area of the station is 20,384 square metres and the total length is 282.3 metres. The station has one island platform.

The station has 3 exits, lettered A, B and D, with Exit A leading to Xiangheyuan North Street, B to Xiangheyuan Road, and D to Zuojiazhuang West Street. Exit A is accessible.
