= Taiyanggong Township =

Taiyanggong Township 太阳宫乡
- Township
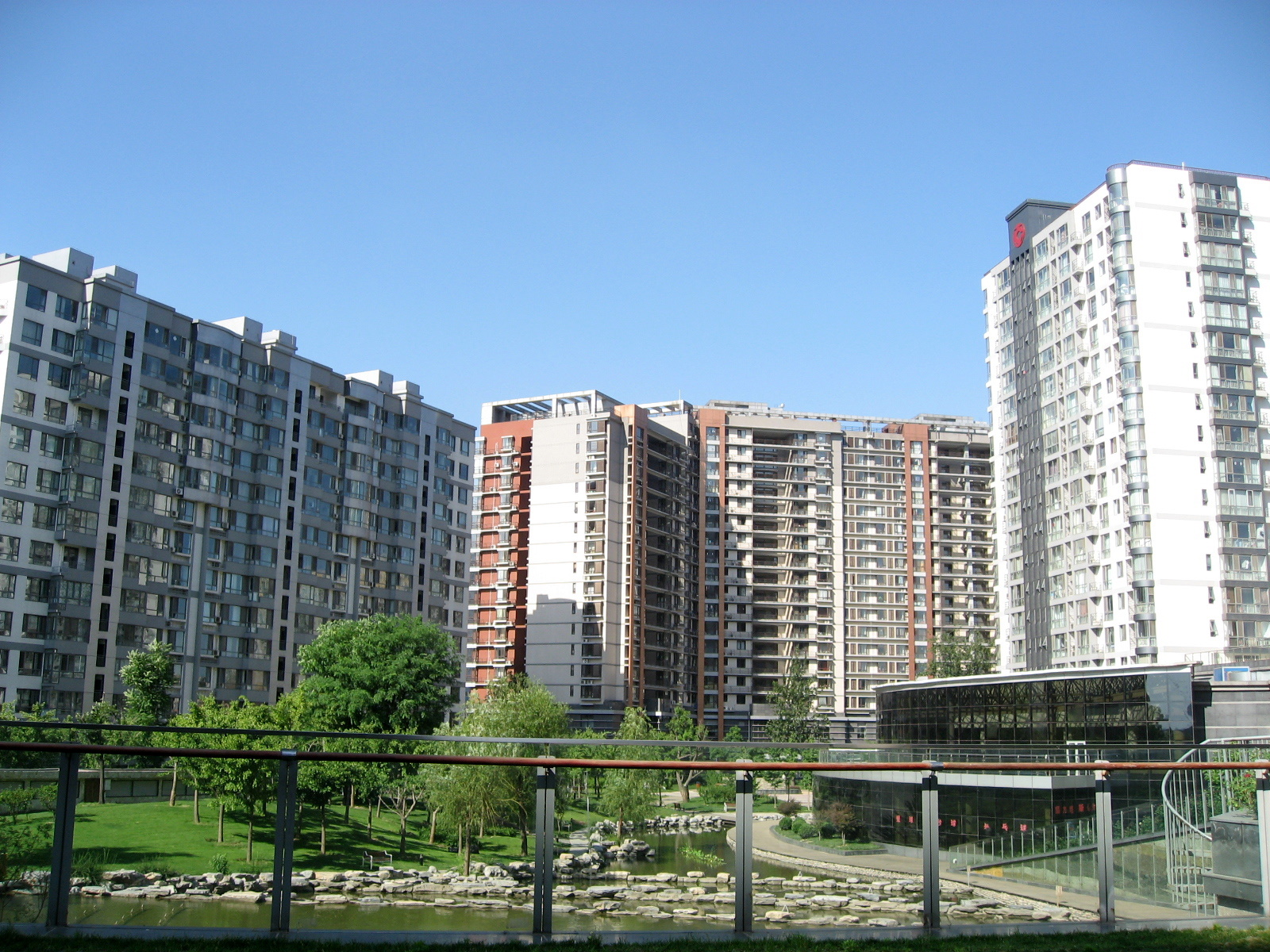
- Taiyang Xingcheng in the center of the Township, 2009

- Location within Beijing Location within China
- Coordinates: 39°58′17″N 116°26′13″E
- Country: China
- Municipality: Beijing
- District: Chaoyang
- Village-level Divisions: 12 communities 3 villages

Area
  - Total: 5.78 km^{2} (2.23 sq mi)

Population (2020)
  - Total: 86,935
  - Density: 15,000/km^{2} (39,000/sq mi)
- Time zone: UTC+8 (China Standard)
- Postal code: 100028
- Area code: 010

Taiyanggong Township (Chinese: 太阳宫乡; pinyin: Tàiyánggōng Xiāng) is a township on the north of Chaoyang District, Beijing, China. It borders Wangjing and Datun Subdistricts to the north, Jiangtai Township to the east, Maizidian, Zuojiazhuang and Xiangheyuan Subdistricts to the south, Hepingjie and Xiaoguan Subdistrict to the west. In 2020, it has a population of 86,935.

The name of the township, Taiyanggong (Chinese: 太阳宫; lit. 'Palace of the Sun'), was first given by the Qianlong Emperor to the region during the Qing dynasty. The region also used to host Taiyanggong Temple that was demolished in the 1950s.

== History ==
Timeline of changes in the status of Taiyanggong Township
Year	Status
1949	Part of the 13th District
1950	Part of the 10th District
1952	Part of Dongjiao District
1956	Part of Guangming Production Cooperative Commune
1958	Part of People's Commune of Heping
1961	Separated from Heping and formed its own commune
1983	Restored as Taiyanggong Township
1993	Becoming an area while retaining township status

== Administrative Divisions ==
As of 2021, Taiyanggong Area has 15 subdivisions, including 12 communities and 3 villages:

Administrative Division Code	Type	Community Name in English	Community Name in Simplified Chinese
110105024010	Community	Shaoyaojuyi	芍药居一
110105024011	Community	Shaoyaoju'er	芍药居二
110105024012	Community	Shaoyaojusan	芍药居三
110105024013	Community	Huizhong'an	惠忠庵
110105024014	Community	Shangjialou	尚家楼
110105024017	Community	Taiyanggong	太阳宫
110105024018	Community	Shizikou	十字口
110105024019	Community	Niuwangmiao	牛王庙
110105024020	Community	Shaoyaojusi	芍药居四
110105024021	Community	Xiajiayuan	夏家园
110105024022	Community	Xibahe Beili	西坝河北里
110105024023	Community	Shaoyaojuwu	芍药居五
110105024200	Village	Taiyanggong	太阳宫
110105024201	Village	Shizikou	十字口
110105024202	Village	Niuwangmiao	牛王庙

== Transport ==
- Shaoyaoju station
- Taiyanggong station

== See also ==
- List of township-level divisions of Beijing
