= Zhang Wenbin =

Zhang Wenbin (张文彬) is the name of the following Chinese people:

- Zhang Wenbin (vice minister) (1919–2013), Vice Minister of the Petroleum Industry
- Zhang Wenbin (Chongqing politician) (born 1934), Chinese People's Political Consultative Conference Chairman of Chongqing
- Zhang Wenbin (archaeologist) (1937–2019), Director of the National Cultural Heritage Administration
- Zhang Wenbin (politician, born 1910) (1910-1944), see Secretary-General of the Chinese Communist Party
