= Taiyanggong station =

Beijing Subway Line 10 and Line 17 station

Coordinates: 39°58′22″N 116°26′51″E

Taiyanggong 太阳宫
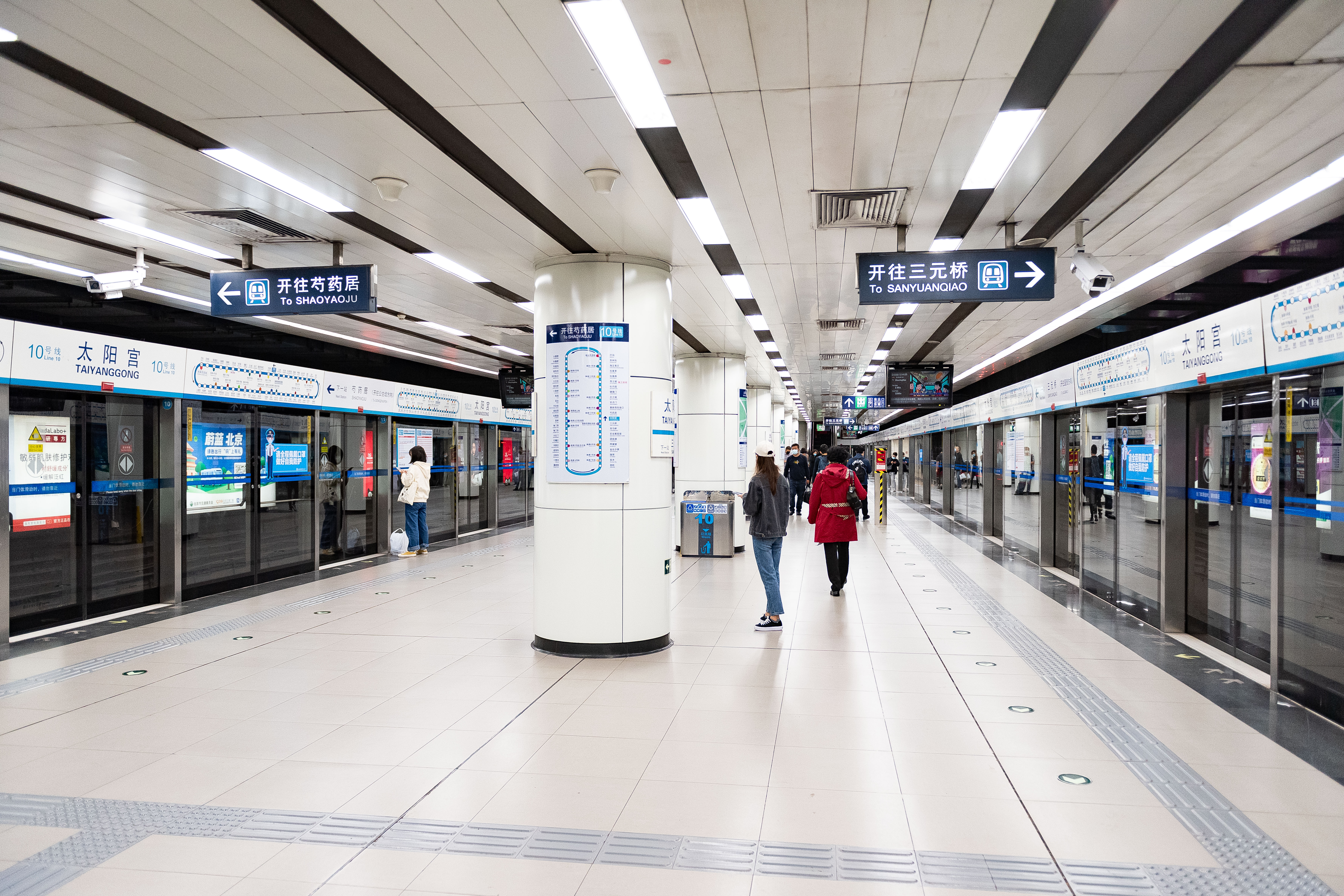
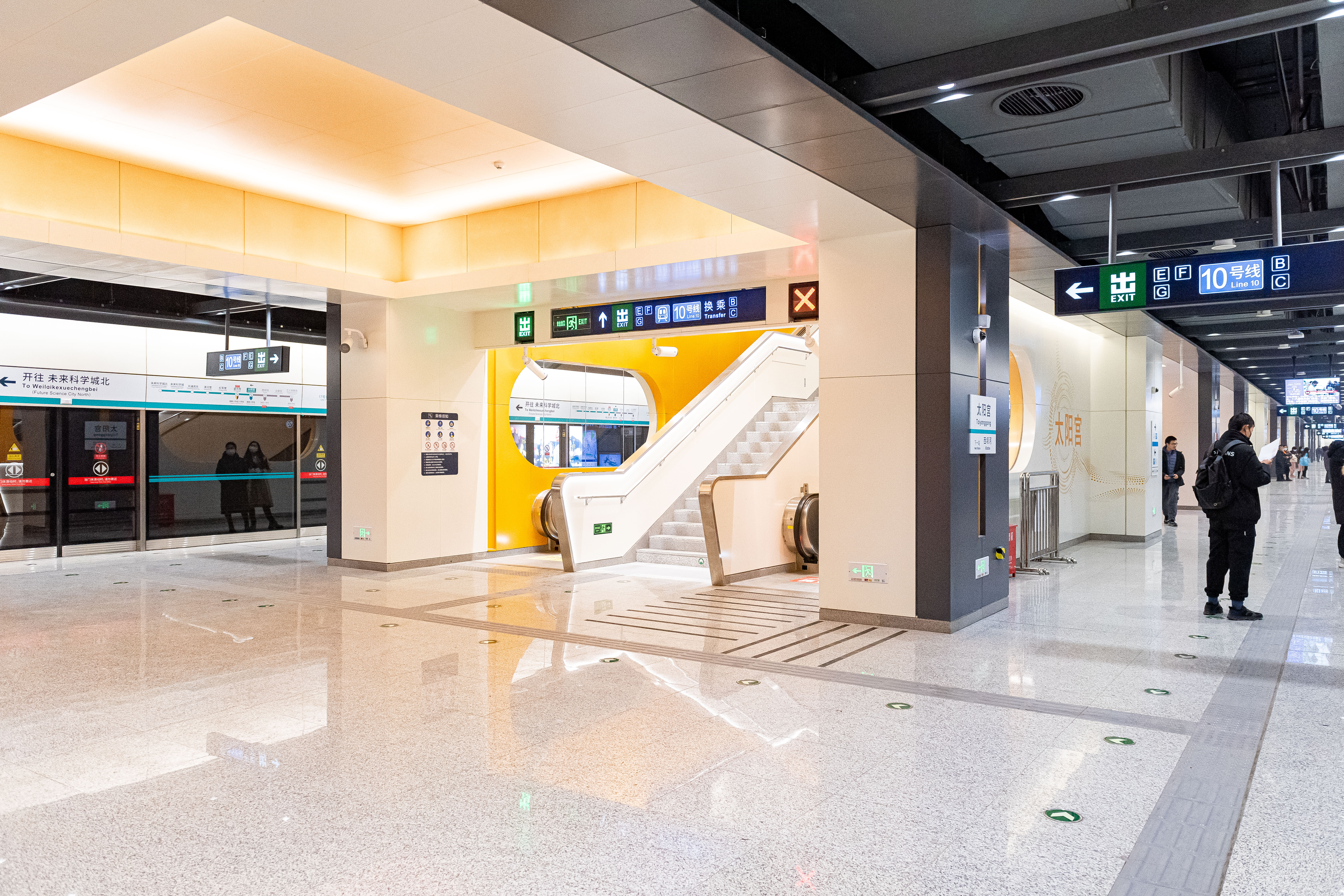
- Line 10 platform Line 17 platform

General information
- Location: Taiyanggong South Street (太阳宫南街) and Taiyanggong Middle Road (太阳宫中路); Taiyanggong, Chaoyang District, Beijing; China
- Operator: Beijing Mass Transit Railway Operation Corporation Limited (Line 10); Beijing MTR (Line 17)
- Lines: Line 10; Line 17
- Platforms: 4 (2 island platforms)
- Tracks: 4

Construction
- Structure type: Underground
- Accessible: Yes

History
- Opened: Line 10: July 19, 2008; 18 years ago; Line 17: December 30, 2023; 2 years ago

Services
Preceding station	Beijing Subway	Following station
Shaoyaoju outer loop / anticlockwise	Line 10	Sanyuan Qiao inner loop / clockwise
Wangjingxi towards Weilaikexuechengbei (Future Science City North)	Line 17	Xibahe towards Jiahuihu
Location
- Location within Beijing

Taiyanggong station (simplified Chinese: 太阳宫站; traditional Chinese: 太陽宮站; pinyin: Tàiyanggōng Zhàn) is an interchange station between Line 10 and Line 17 of the Beijing Subway.

The station became an interchange station between Line 10 and Line 17 on December 30, 2023.

== Station layout ==
The station has an underground island platform.

== Exits ==
There are 7 exits, lettered A, B, C, and D, E, F and G, with Exits B, E and G leading to Taiyanggong Middle Road, C to Taiyanggong Street, D to Beijing Yueming Hospital, F to Taiyanggong North Street and A to both Taiyanggong Middle Road and Taiyanggong Street. Exits C and G are accessible.

== Gallery ==
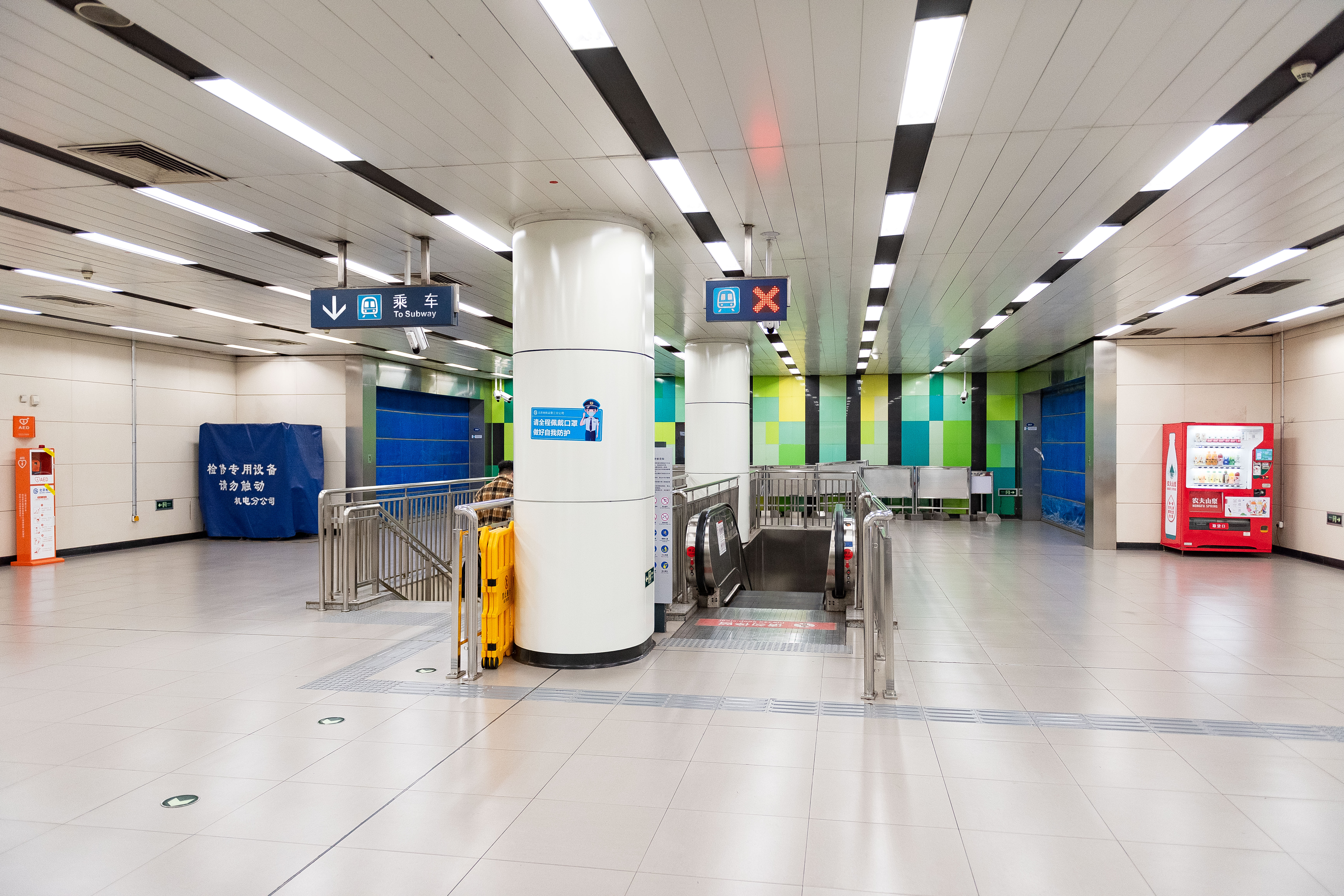
Line 10 west concourse

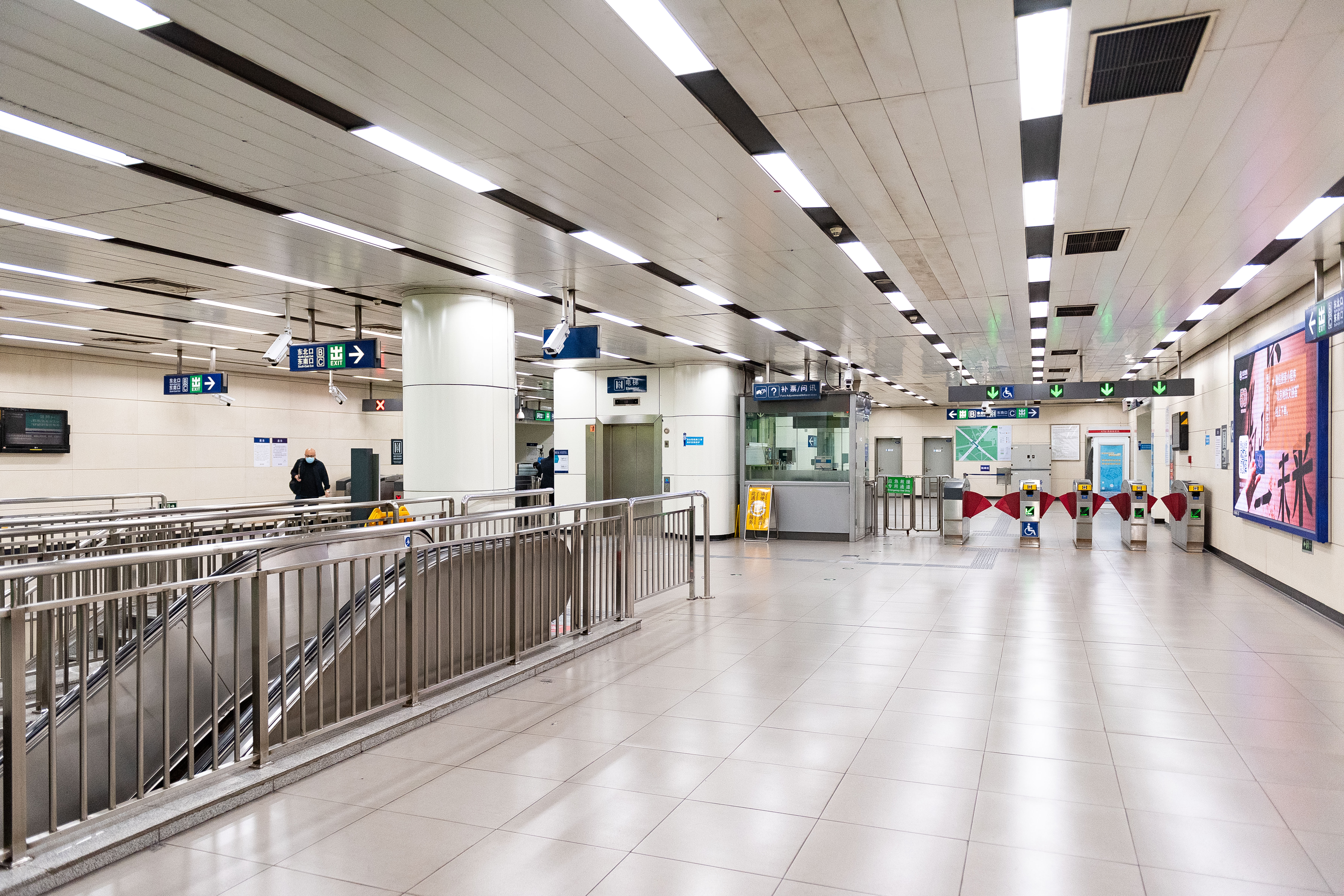
Line 10 east concourse
