= Shaoyaoju station =

Beijing Subway interchange station

Coordinates: 39°58′39″N 116°26′09″E

Shaoyaoju 芍药居
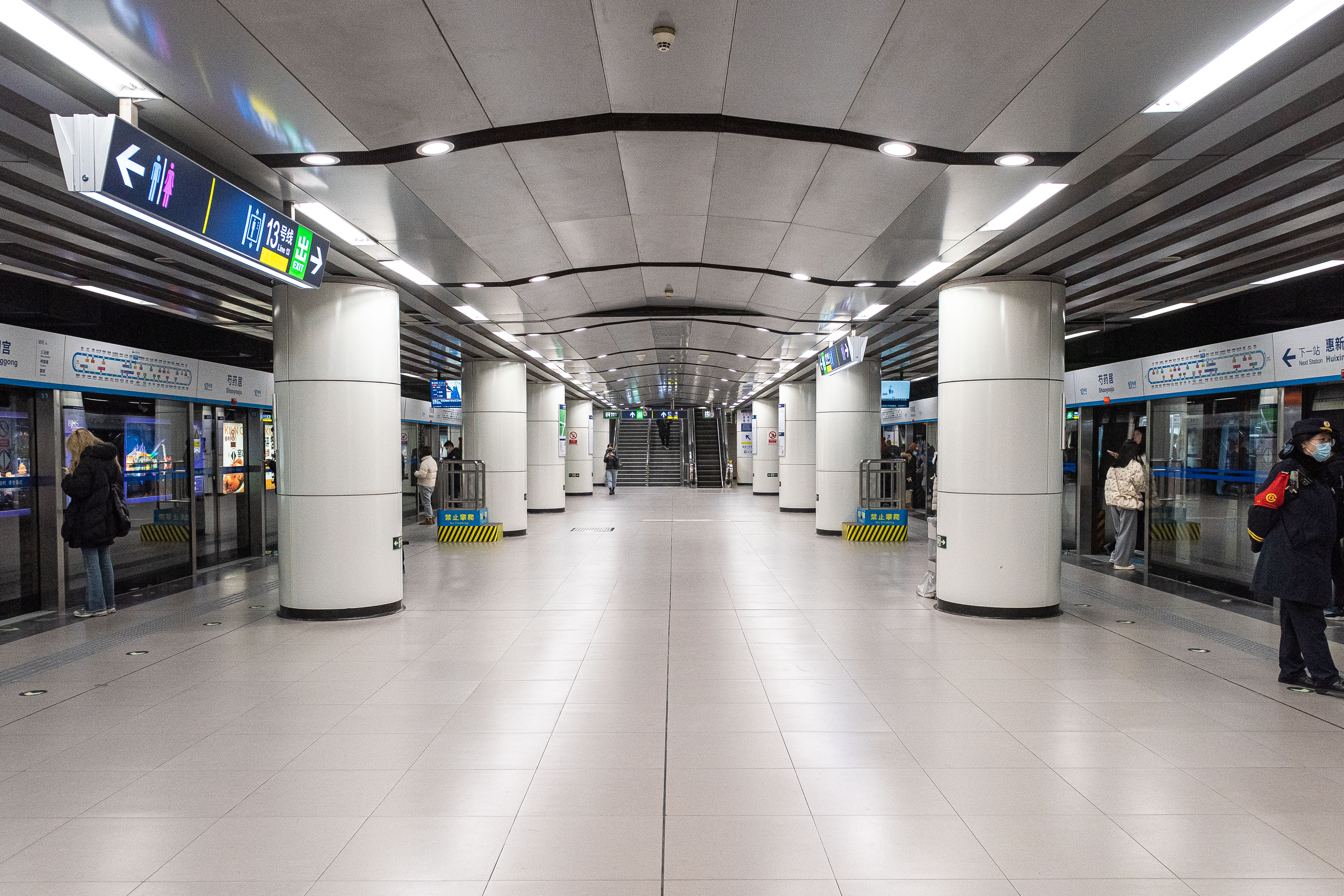
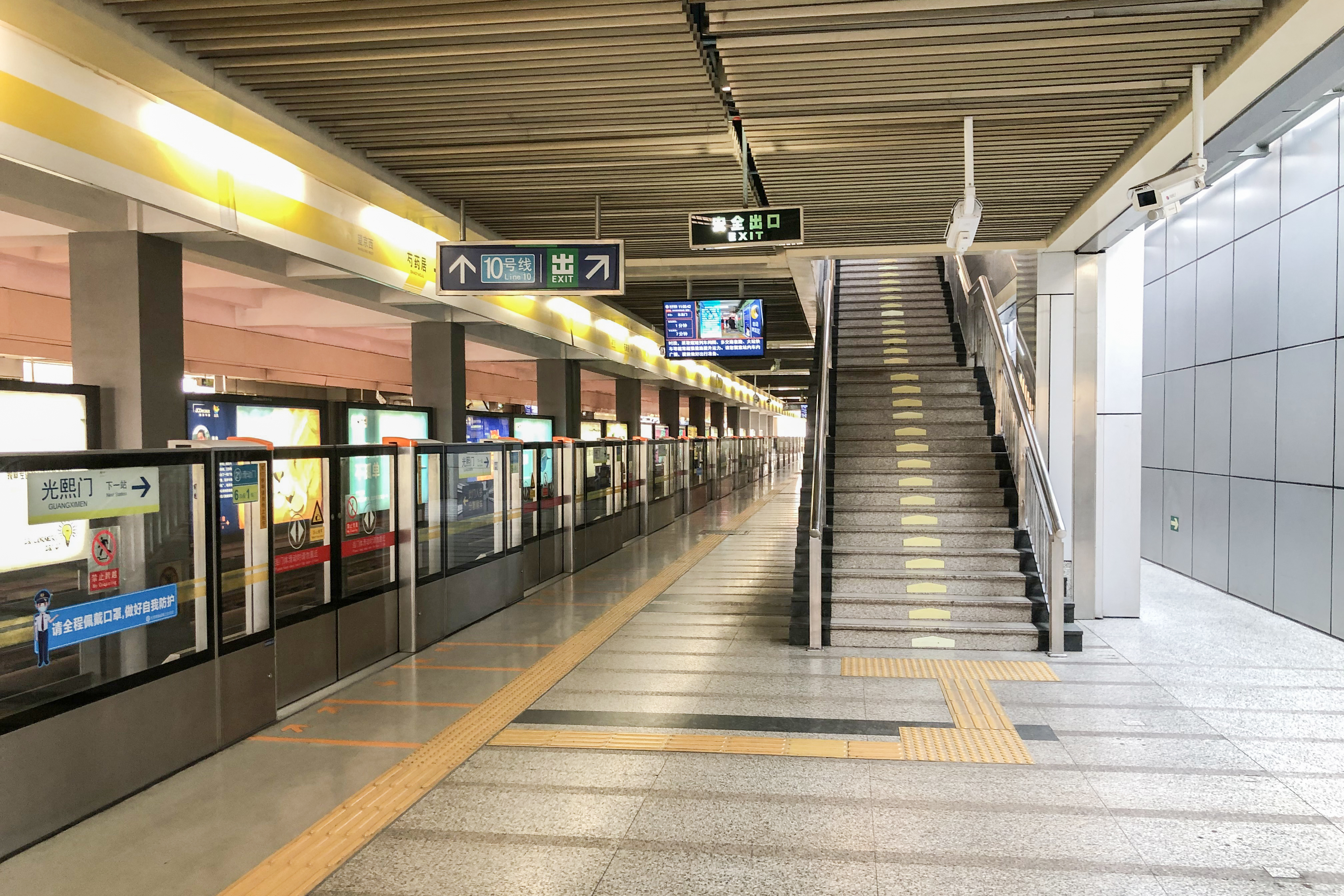
- Line 10 platform Line 13 southbound platform

General information
- Location: Taiyanggong, Chaoyang District, Beijing; China
- Operator: Beijing Mass Transit Railway Operation Corporation Limited
- Lines: Line 10; Line 13
- Platforms: 4 (1 island platform and 2 side platforms)
- Tracks: 4

Construction
- Structure type: Underground (Line 10); At-grade (Line 13)
- Accessible: Yes

Other information
- Station code: 1313 (Line 13)

History
- Opened: July 19, 2008; 18 years ago (Line 10); January 28, 2003; 23 years ago (Line 13)

Services
Preceding station	Beijing Subway	Following station
Huixin Xijie Nankou outer loop / anticlockwise	Line 10	Taiyanggong inner loop / clockwise
Wangjingxi towards Xizhimen	Line 13	Guangximen towards Dongzhimen
Location
- Location within Beijing

Shaoyaoju Station (simplified Chinese: 芍药居站; traditional Chinese: 芍藥居站; pinyin: Sháoyàojū Zhàn) is a station on Line 10 and Line 13 of the Beijing Subway.

== Station layout ==
The line 10 station has an underground island platform. The line 13 station has 2 ground-level side platforms.

== Exits ==
There are 5 exits, lettered A, B, E, F, and G. Exits B and E are accessible.

== Gallery ==
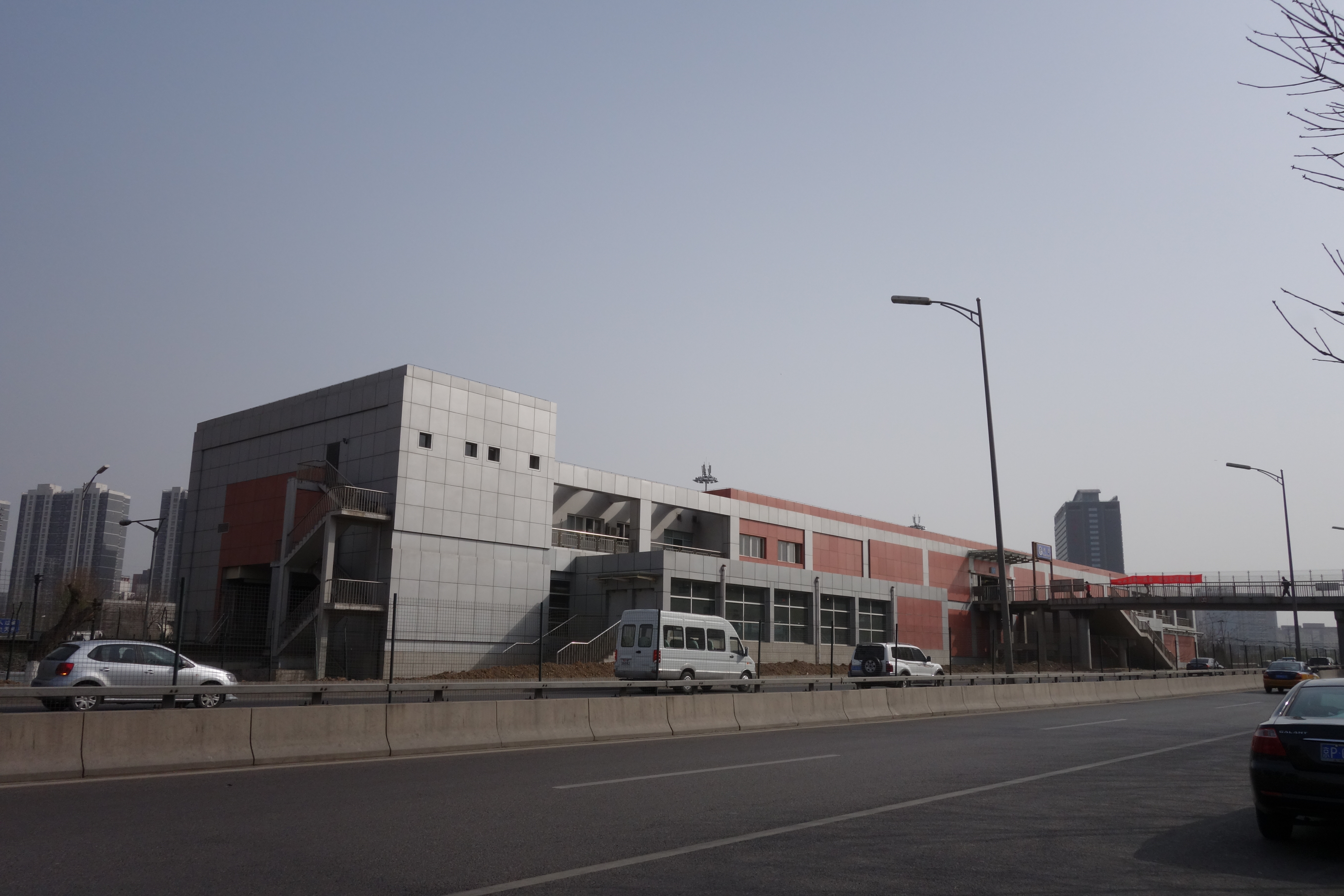
Line 13 station exterior

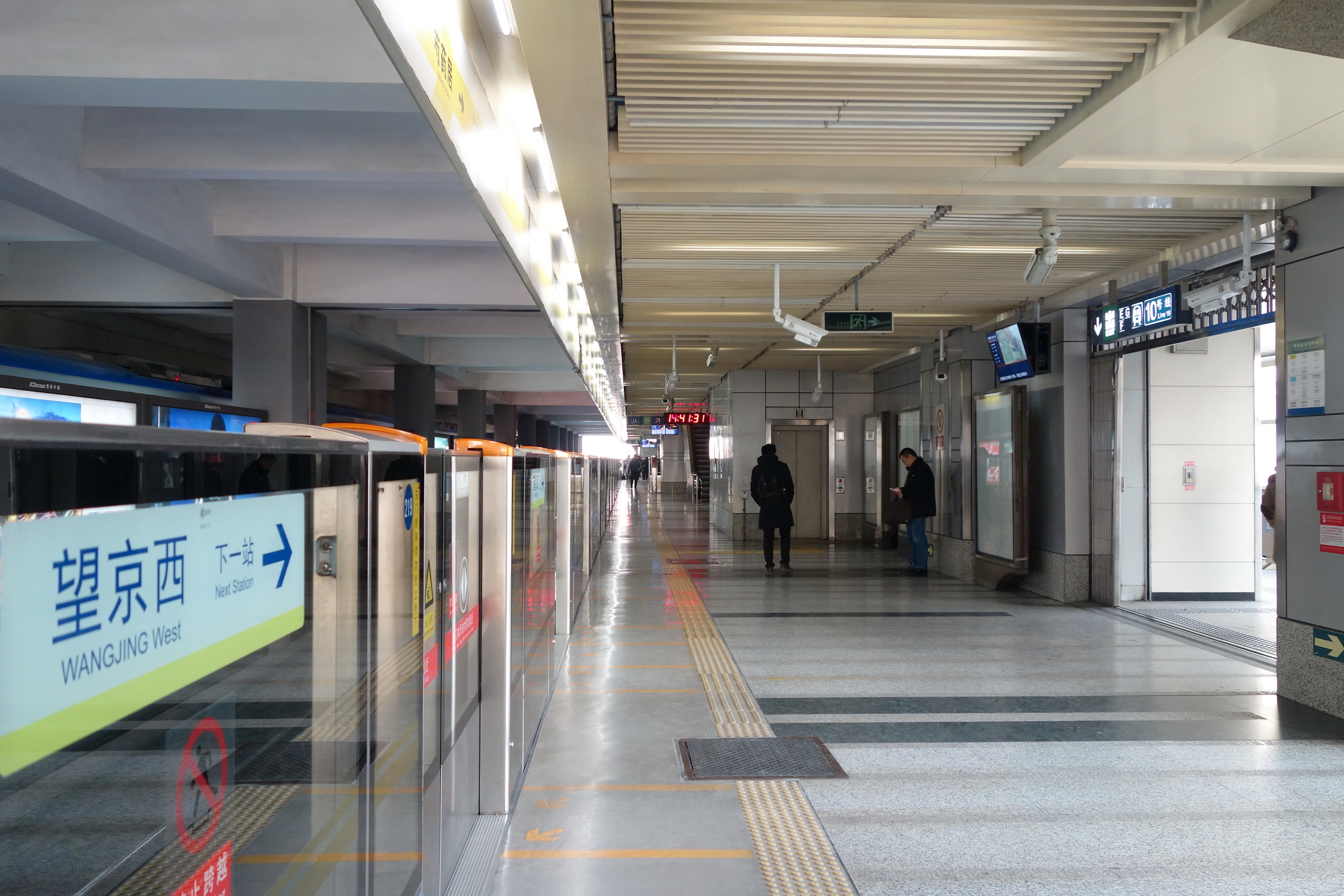
Line 13 northbound platform (December 2018)

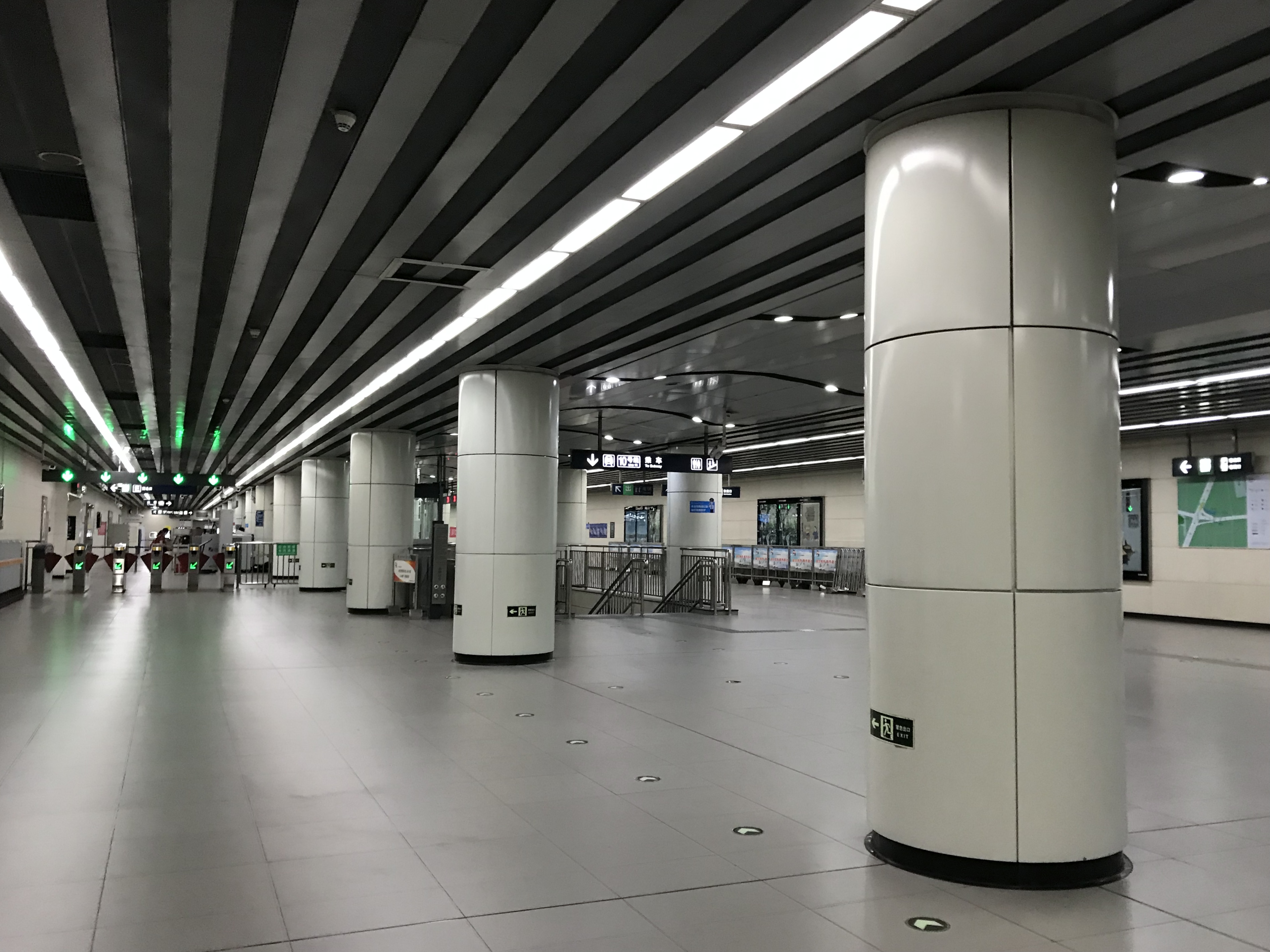
Line 10 concourse (July 2020)

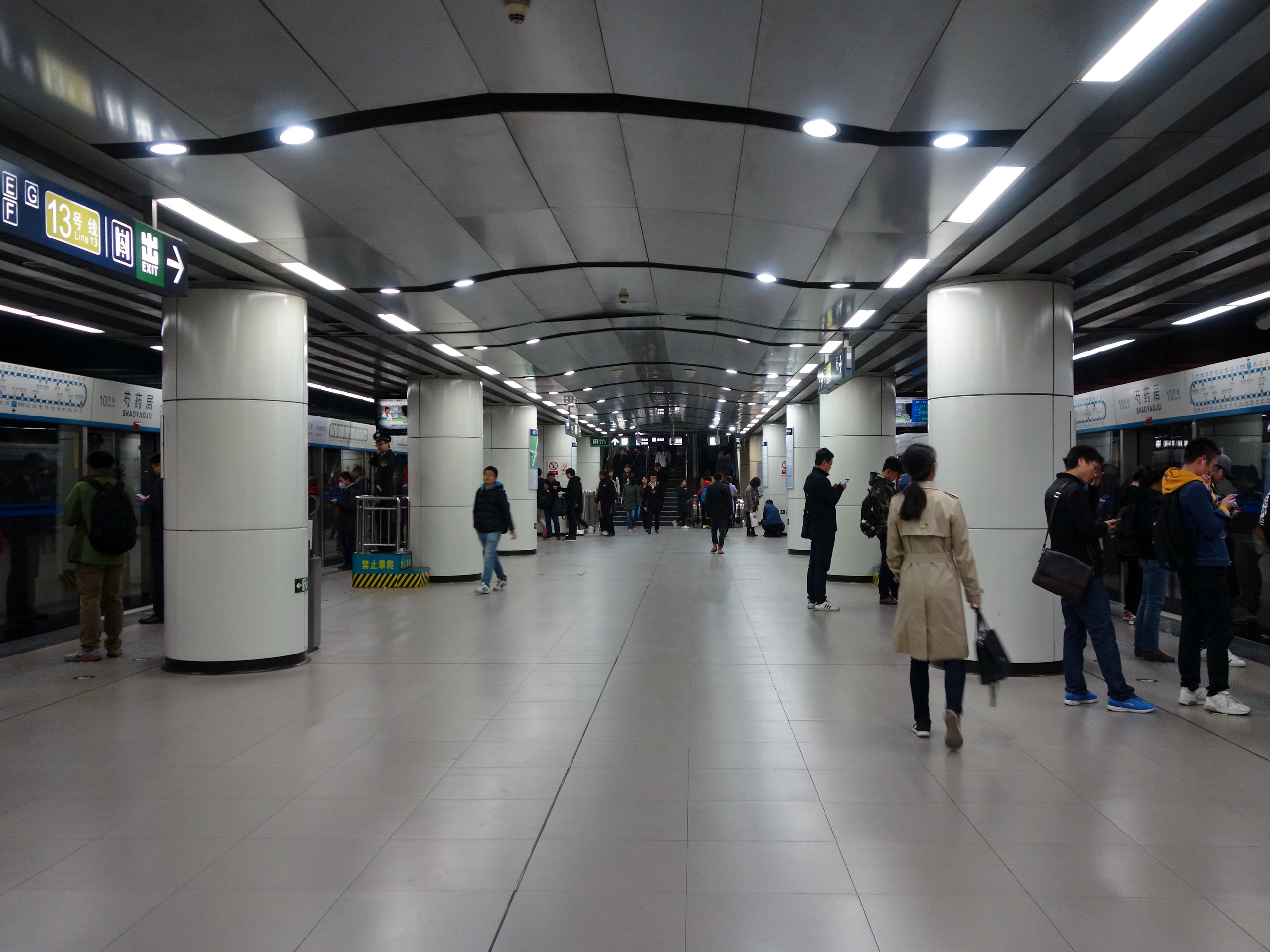
Line 10 platform (October 2018)

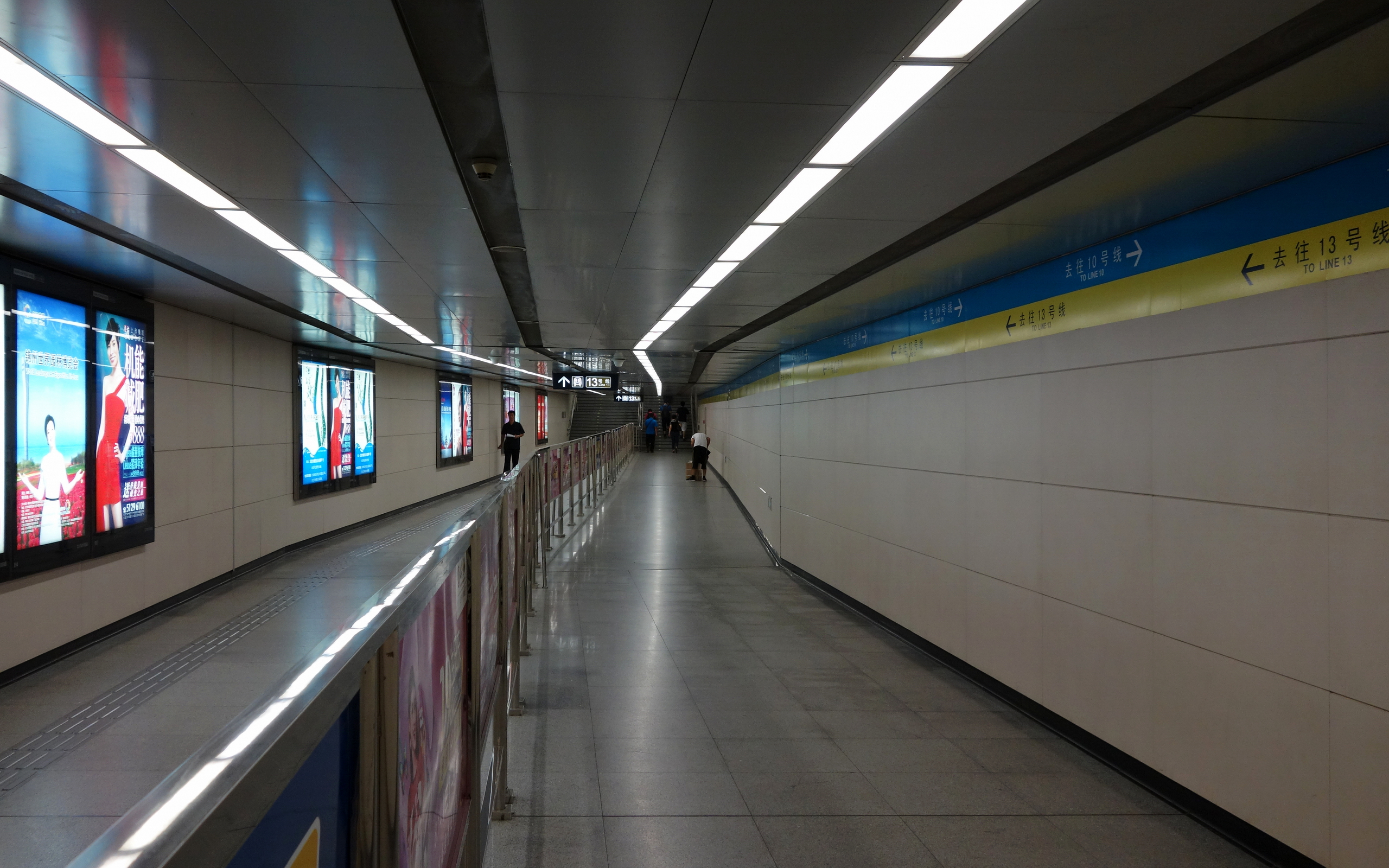
Transfer corridor
