= Zhang Wenbin (Chongqing politician) =

Chinese politician (born 1934)

Zhang Wenbin (Chinese: 张文彬; born August 1934) is a Chinese politician who served as the first Chairman of the Chinese People's Political Consultative Conference (CPPCC) of the Chongqing municipality.

== Biography ==
Zhang was born in August 1934 in Chongqing, Sichuan, Republic of China. He entered the work force in May 1951 as a tax collector in Ba County. Later in the 1950s, he was promoted to deputy chief of the Ba County tax bureau and chief of the county finance bureau. In December 1978 he was appointed Deputy Party Committee Secretary of Ba County, and then promoted to Party Secretary in March 1981.

In June 1988, Zhang was appointed Vice Mayor of Chongqing and Director of its Organization Department. In April 1991, he became Deputy Party Secretary of Chongqing. In June 1993, he was appointed Chairman of the Chinese People's Political Consultative Conference (CPPCC) of Chongqing.

When Chongqing was separated from Sichuan province in 1997 and upgraded to a provincial-level municipality, Zhang became the first CPPCC chairman of the Chongqing municipality.
