= Xiangheyuan Subdistrict =

Xiangheyuan Subdistrict 香河园街道
- Subdistrict
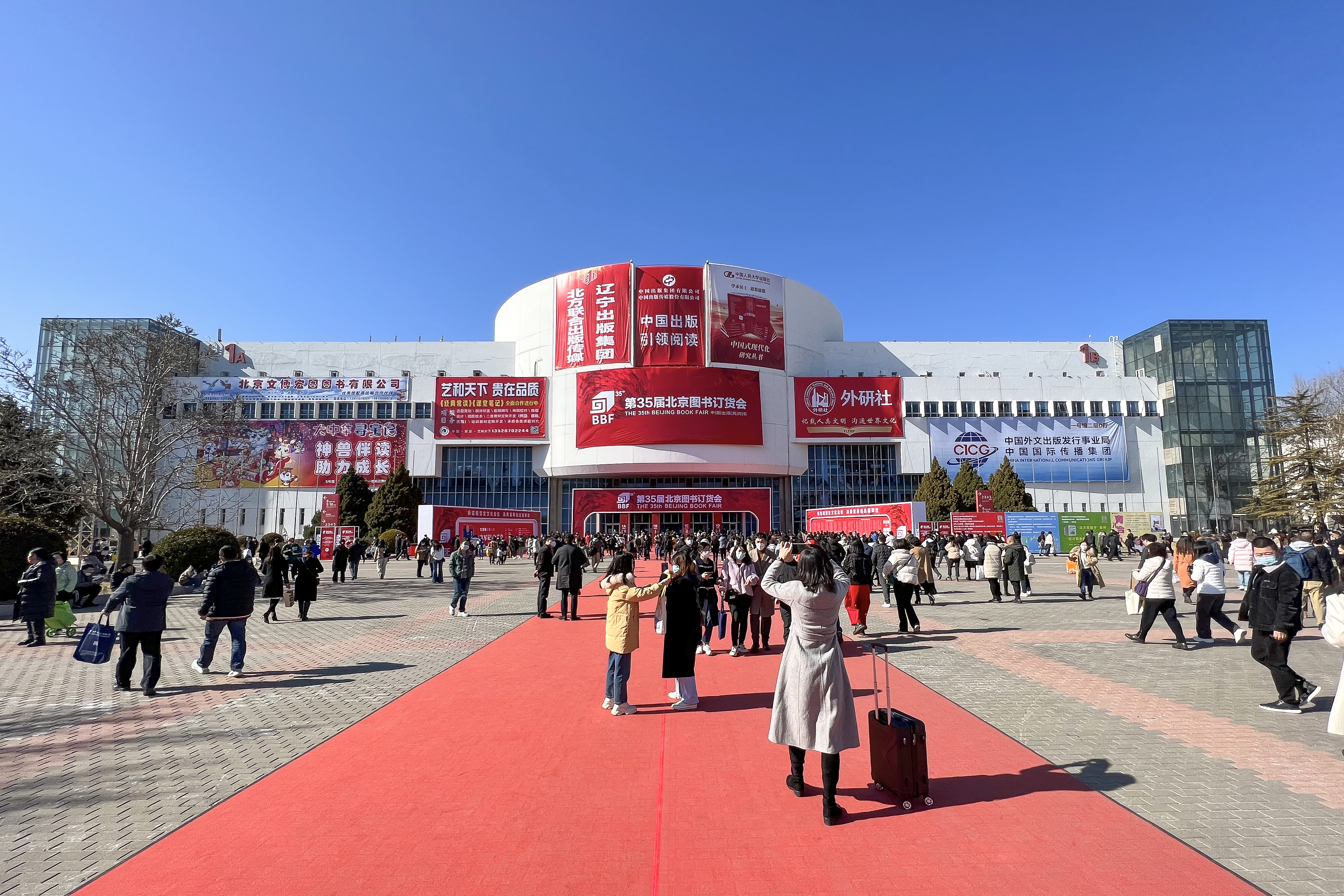
- China International Exhibition Center Chaoyang Hall within the subdistrict, 2023

- Location within Beijing
- Country: China
- Municipality: Beijing
- District: Chaoyang

Area
  - Total: 2.5 km^{2} (0.97 sq mi)

Population (2020)
  - Total: 43,002
  - Density: 17,000/km^{2} (45,000/sq mi)
- Time zone: UTC+8 (China Standard)
- Postal code: 100028
- Area code: 010

Xiangheyuan Subdistrict (Chinese: 香河园街道; pinyin: Xiānghéyuán Jiēdào) is a township-level division situated in Chaoyang District Beijing, China. In 2020, it had a total population of 43,002.

The subdistrict was named after Xiangheyuan (Chinese: 香河园; lit. 'Garden of Fragrant River') Road within it.

== History ==
Timeline of changes in the status of Xiangheyuan Subdistrict
Time	Status
Qing dynasty	Part of Daxing County, Shuntian Prefecture
1925	Part of East Suburban District
1947	Part of 8th Suburban District
1949	Part of 14th District, East Suburb
1952	Part of Taiyangong Township
1957	Incorporated into Zuojiazhuang Subdistrict except Xibahe Beili
1959	Part of Wuluju Subdistrict
1968	Part of Heping Street Subdistrict
1977	Part of Zuojiazhuang Subdistrict
1987	Separated from Zuojiazhuang Subdistrict and established as Xiangheyuan Subdistrict

== Administrative Division ==
At the end of 2021, there were nine communities within the subdistrict:

Administrative Division Code	Community Name in English	Community Name in Simplified Chinese
110105006034	Xibahe Nanli	西坝河南里
110105006037	Xibahe Xili	西坝河西里
110105006038	Xibahe Zhongli	西坝河中里
110105006039	Liufang Beili	柳芳北里
110105006040	Liufang Nanli	柳芳南里
110105006041	Guangximen Beilibei	光熙门北里北
110105006042	Guangximen Beilinan	光熙门北里南
110105006043	Xibahe Dongli	西坝河东里
110105006044	Guangxi Jiayuan	光熙家园

== See also ==
- List of township-level divisions of Beijing
