= Zuojiazhuang Subdistrict =

Zuojiazhuang Subdistrict 左家庄街道
- Subdistrict
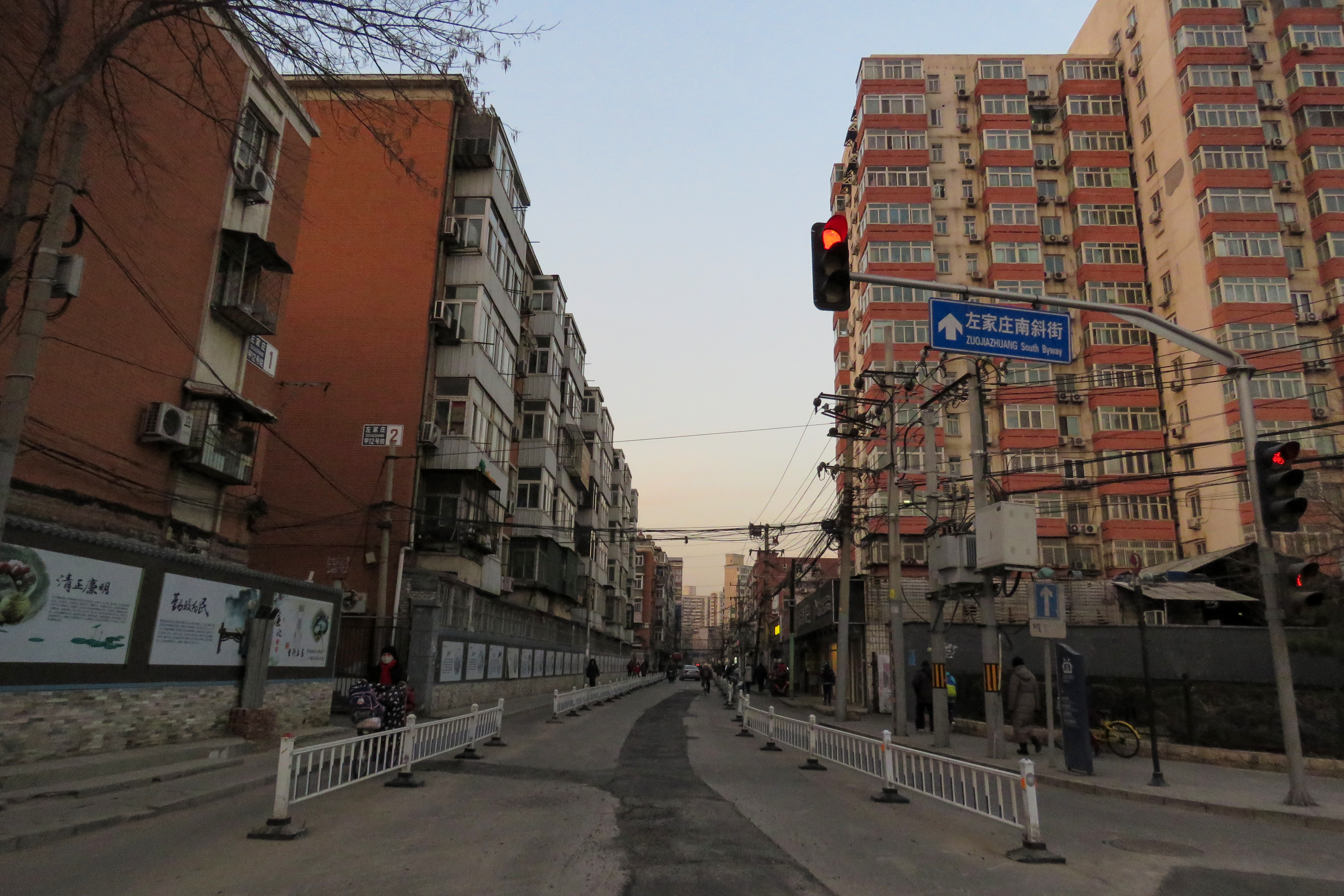
- Zuojiazhuang South Byway

- Location within Beijing Location within China
- Coordinates: 39°56′54″N 116°26′42″E
- Country: China
- Municipality: Beijing
- District: Chaoyang
- Elevation: 44 m (144 ft)

Population (2020)
  - Total: 70,245
- Time zone: UTC+8 (China Standard)
- Postal code: 100027
- Area code: 010

Zuojiazhuang Subdistrict (Chinese: 左家庄街道; pinyin: Zuǒjiāzhuāng Jiēdào) is a subdistrict of Chaoyang District, Beijing. 2020, it has a total population of 70,245

== History ==
Timeline of changes in status of Zuojiazhuang
Year	Status
Ming Dynasty	Part of Daxing County, Shuntian Prefecture
1912	Part of East Suburban District
1947	Part of 8th Suburban District
1952	Part of Taiyanggong Township, East Suburban District
1957	Separated from Taiyanggong and formed Zuojiazhuang Subdistrict
1959	Incorporated into Wuluju Subdistrict
1968	Incorporated into Heping Street Subdistrict
1977	Restored as Zuojiazhuang Subdistrict

== Administrative Division ==
At the end of 2021, the subdistrict has 11 communities under it:

Administrative Division Code	Community Name in English	Community Name in Simplified Chinese
110105005048	Xinyuanli	新源里
110105005049	Sanyuanli	三源里
110105005050	Shunyuanli	顺源里
110105005051	Xinyuan Xili	新源西里
110105005052	Jing'anli	静安里
110105005053	Zuodongli	左东里
110105005054	Zuonanli	左南里
110105005055	Zuobeili	左北里
110105005056	Shuguangli	曙光里
110105005057	Shuguang Fenghuangcheng	曙光凤凰城
110105005058	Shuguanglixi	曙光里西

== See also ==
- List of township-level divisions of Beijing
