= Xiaoguan Subdistrict =

Xiaoguan Subdistrict 小关街道
- Subdistrict
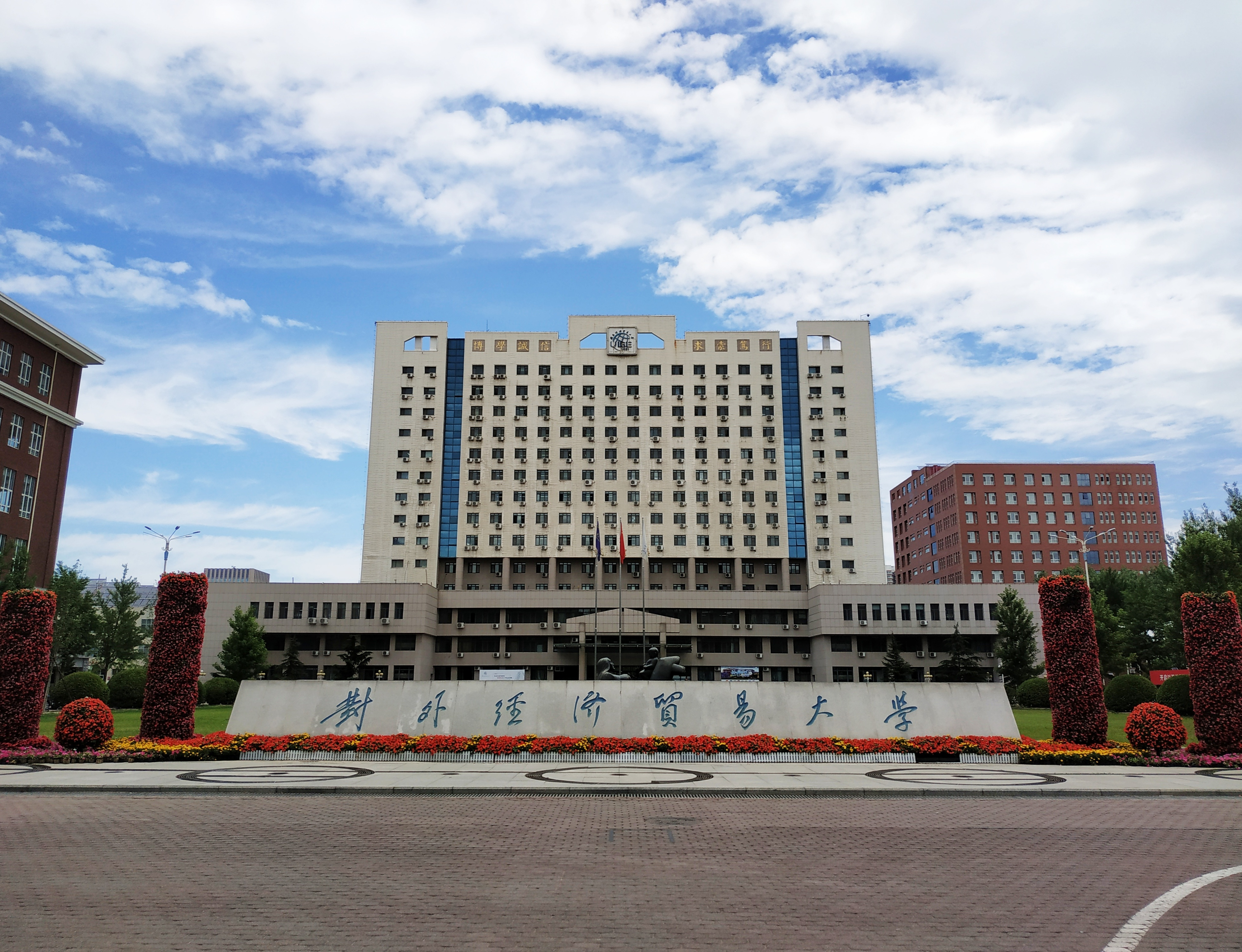
- University of International Business and Economics within the subdsitrict, 2019

- Location within Beijing Location within China
- Coordinates: 39°58′34″N 116°24′23″E
- Country: China
- Municipality: Beijing
- District: Chaoyang

Area
  - Total: 2.58 km^{2} (1.00 sq mi)

Population (2020)
  - Total: 61,966
  - Density: 24,000/km^{2} (62,200/sq mi)
- Time zone: UTC+8 (China Standard)
- Postal code: 100029
- Area code: 010

Xiaoguan Subdistrict (Chinese: 小关街道; pinyin: Xiǎoguān Jiēdào) is a subdistrict on the northwest of Chaoyang District, Beijing, China. It borders Taiyanggong Township to the East, Hepingjie Subdistrict to the south, Yayuncun Subdistrict to the west, and Datun Subdistrict to the north. As of 2020, it has a total population of 61,966.

This district's name, Xiaoguan (Chinese: 小关; lit. 'Small Pass') came from the fact that there used to be a checkpoint within the area.

== History ==
In 1975, Deqing Road Subdistrict was created within this area, and the name was changed to Xiaoguan Subdistrict 3 years later. In 1987, the land of what would become Anzhen Subdistrict was separated from the subdistrict.

== Administrative Division ==
At the end of 2021, there are a total of 8 communities under Xiaoguan Subdistrict:

Administrative Division Code	Community Name in English	Community Name in Simplified Chinese
110105010022	Huixinyuan	惠新苑
110105010023	Huixin Beili	惠新北里
110105010024	Gaoyuanjie	高原街
110105010025	Xiaoguan	小关
110105010026	Huixinli	惠新里
110105010027	Xiaoguan Dongjie	小关东街
110105010028	Huixin Dongjie	惠新东街
110105010029	Huixin Xijie	惠新西街
