= Anzhen Subdistrict =

Anzhen Subdistrict 安贞街道
- Subdistrict
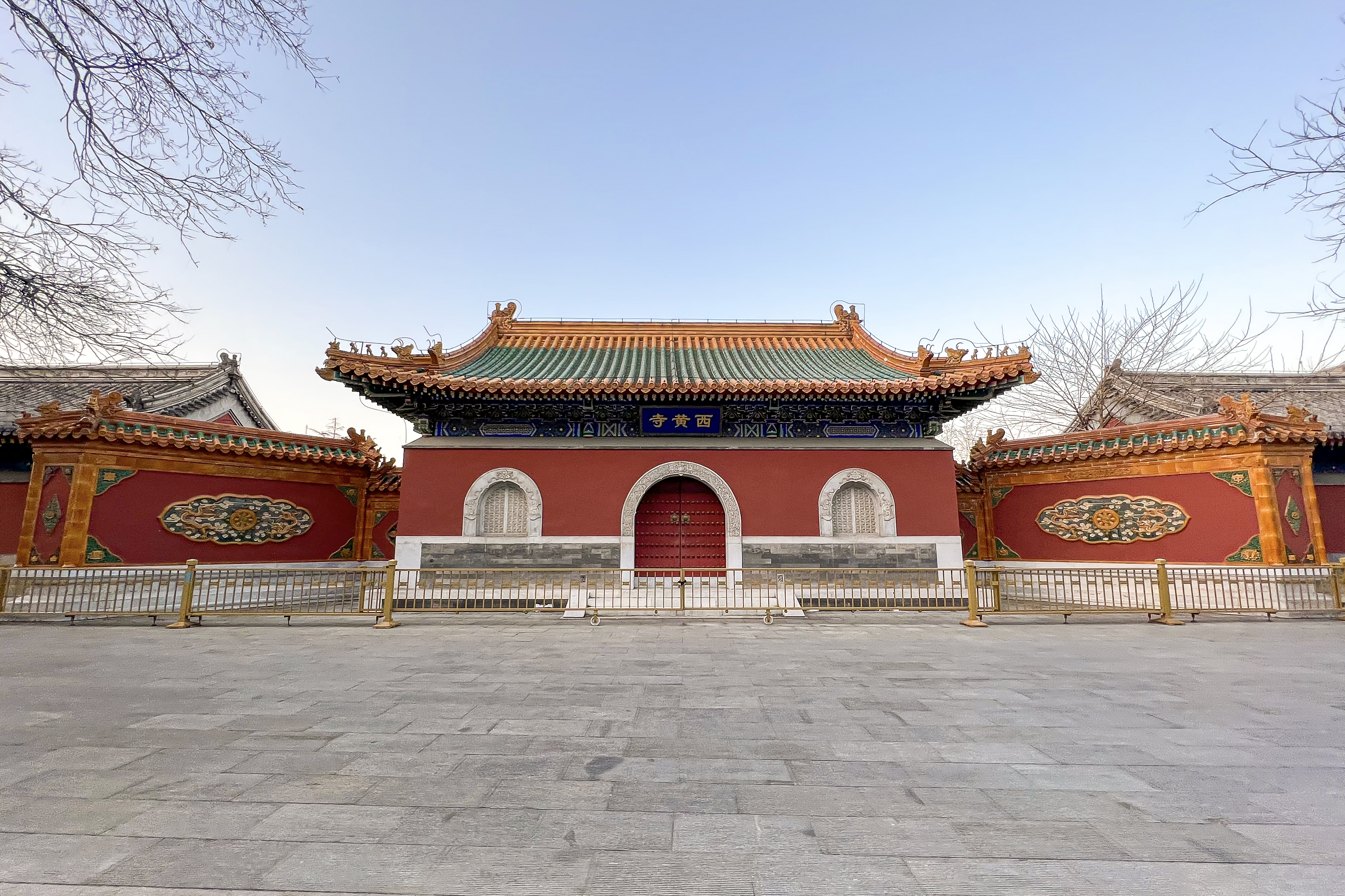
- Xihuang Temple within the subdistrict, 2021

- Location within Beijing Location within China
- Coordinates: 39°57′58″N 116°23′41″E
- Country: China
- Municipality: Beijing
- District: Chaoyang

Area
  - Total: 3.6 km^{2} (1.4 sq mi)

Population (2020)
  - Total: 57,016
  - Density: 16,000/km^{2} (41,000/sq mi)
- Time zone: UTC+8 (China Standard)
- Postal code: 100011
- Area code: 010

Anzhen Subdistrict (Chinese: 安贞街道; pinyin: Ānzhēn Jiēdào) is a subdistrict on the northwest portion of Chaoyang District, Beijing, China. As of 2020, it has a total population of 57,016.

The subdistrict got its name from Anzhenmen (Chinese: 安贞门; lit. 'Gate of Peace and Virtue'), a former city gate of Khanbaliq.

== History ==
Timeline of changes in the status of Anzhen Subdistrict
Time	Status
Yuan dynasty	Part of Dadu
1925	Part of North Suburban District
1947	Part of 7th Suburban District
1950	Part of Wuluju Township
1952	Wuluju Township was transferred under East Suburban District
1968	Transferred to Hepingjie Subdistrict
1977	Transferred to Xiaoguan Subdistrict
1987	Separated from Xiaoguan Subdistrict, two subdistricts were created: Anzhenli and Anhuali
1990	The two subdistricts were combined to form Anzhen Subdistrict

== Administrative Division ==
As of 2021, there are 10 communities under the subdistrict:

Administrative Division Code	Community Name in English	Community Name in Simplified Chinese
110105008052	Anzhenli	安贞里
110105008053	Anzhen Xili	安贞西里
110105008054	Anhuali	安华里
110105008055	Anhua Xili	安华西里
110105008056	Huangsi	黄寺
110105008057	Yuminlu	裕民路
110105008058	Yongxi	涌溪
110105008059	Wuluju	五路居
110105008060	Anwai	安外
110105008061	Waiguan	外馆

== Landmark ==
- Xihuang Temple
