= Xihuang Temple =

Buddhist temple in Beijing, China

- 西黄寺
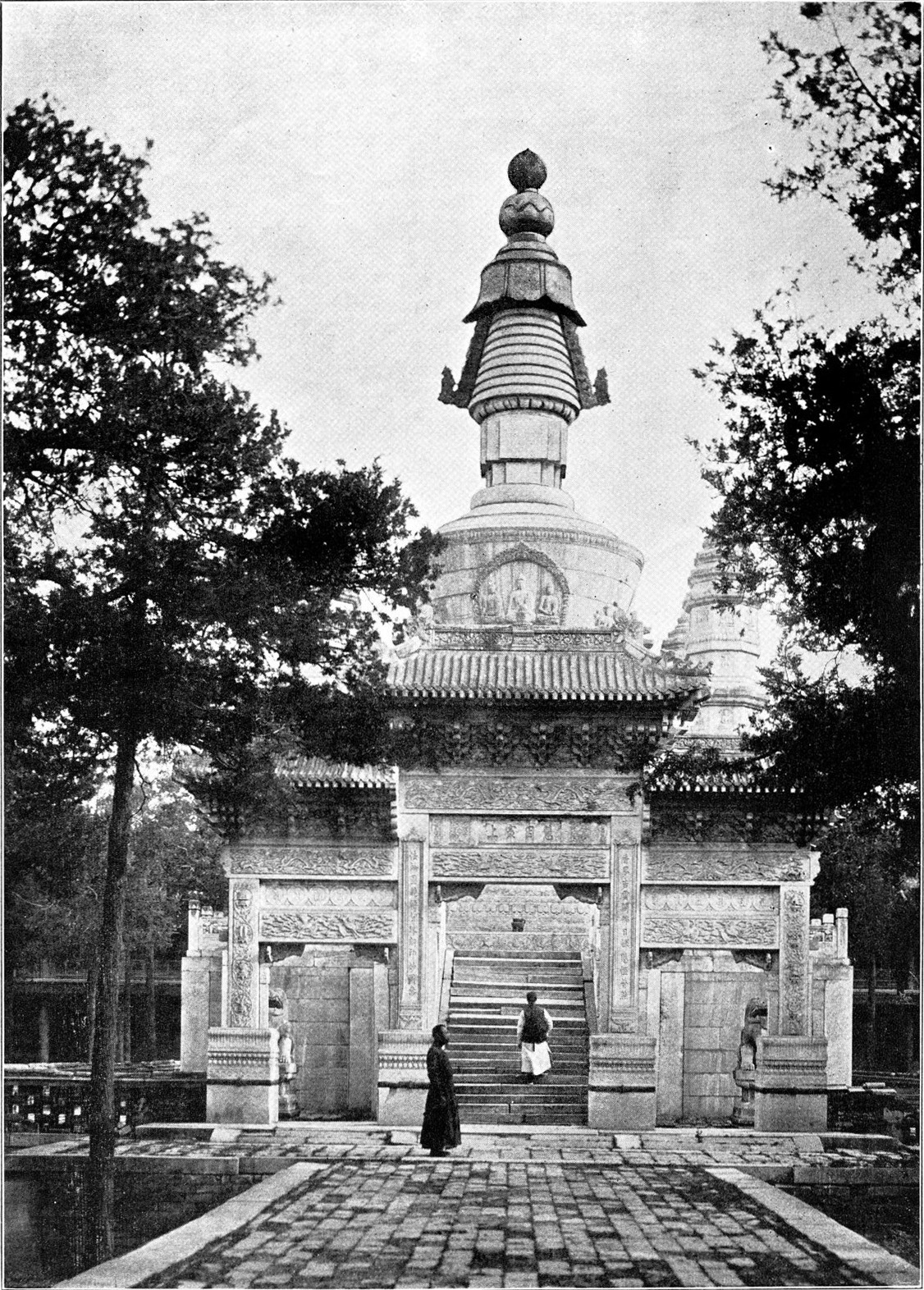
- A white pagoda at Xihuang Temple.

- Location within Beijing Location within Beijing

Religion
- Affiliation: Buddhism
- Sect: Tibetan Buddhism–Gelug

Location
- Location: Chaoyang District, Beijing
- Country: China
- Interactive map of Xihuang Temple
- Coordinates: 39°58′11″N 116°23′49″E

Architecture
- Style: Chinese architecture
- Founder: Shunzhi Emperor
- Established: 1652

Xihuang Temple (simplified Chinese: 西黄寺; traditional Chinese: 西黃寺; pinyin: Xīhuáng Sì) is a Buddhist temple located in Chaoyang District, Beijing.

== History ==
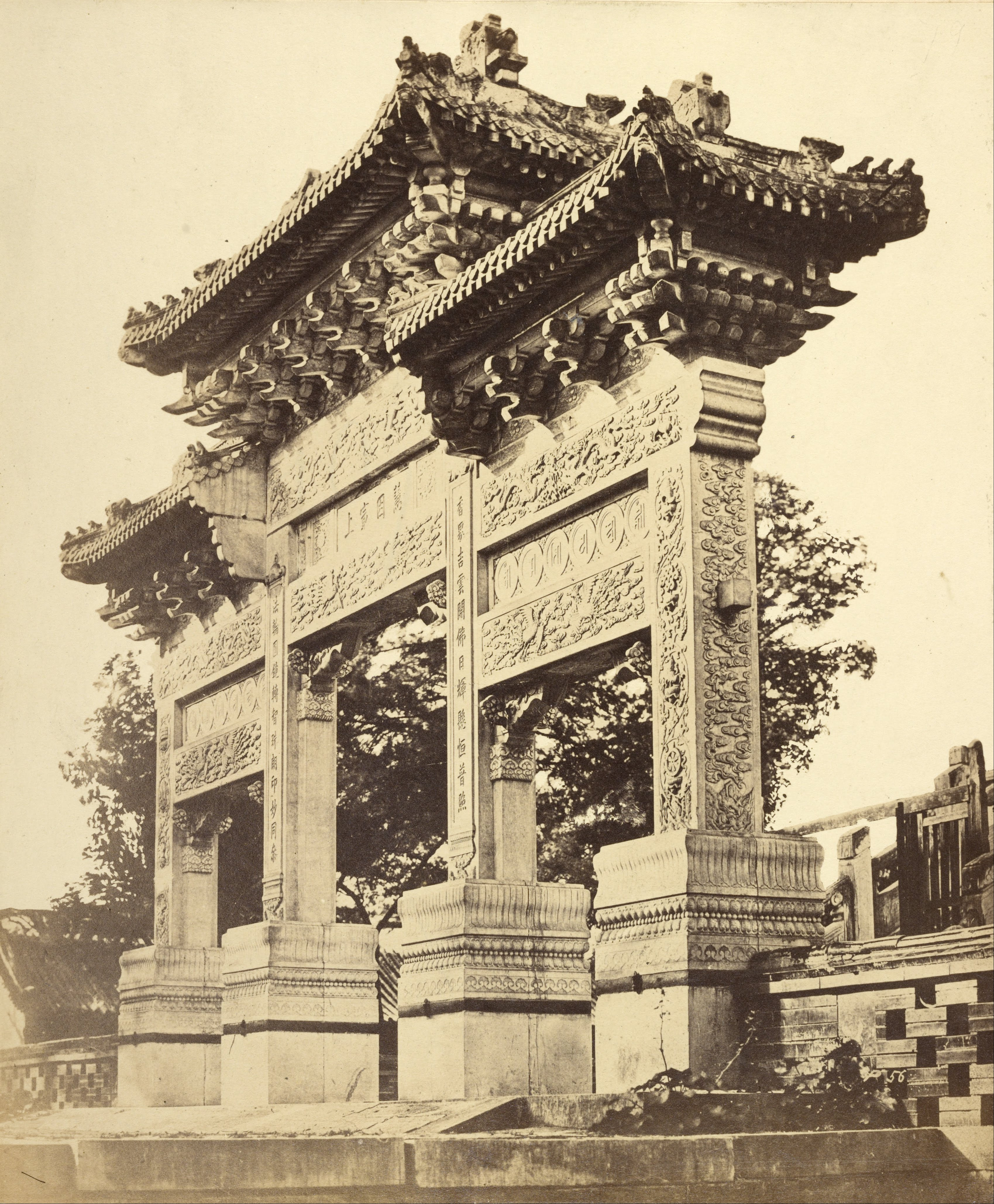
The paifang at Xihuang Temple, photoed by Felice Beato.

=== Qing dynasty ===
In 1644, Shunzhi Emperor established the Qing dynasty (1644–1911) in Beijing. In order to deal with military and political affairs, he invited the 5th Dalai Lama to Beijing in 1651. Shunzhi Emperor issued the decree building the temple as the residence for the 5th Dalai Lama.

In 1780, after the Parinirvana of the 6th Panchen Lama, Qianlong Emperor ordered built a white pagoda to commemorate him. The construction completed in 1982, Qianlong Emperor named it "Qingjing Huacheng Pagoda" (清净化成塔).

Xihuang Temple was devastated by the combined armies of the English and French during the Second Opium War in 1860. Forty years later in 1900, the Eight-Nation Alliance ransacked Xihuang Temple during the Invasion of Beijing.

In 1908, the 13th Dalai Lama lived here for almost three months.

=== Republic of China ===
In 1923, the 9th Panchen Lama came to Beijing and lived in Xihuang Temple.

=== People's Republic of China ===
After the establishment of the Communist State in 1954, the 10th Panchen Lama and 14th Dalai Lama paid religious homage to Xihuang Temple while they attending the 1st National People's Congress.

In 1979, Xihuang Temple was inscribed to the Beijing Municipal Cultural Preservation Pnit List. The Beijing Municipal Government refurbished and redecorated the temple in the following year.

Xihuang Temple has been designated as a National Key Buddhist Temple in Han Chinese Area by the State Council of China in 1983.

In September 1987, the 10th Panchen Lama set up the High-Level Tibetan Buddhism College of China at the temple.

In 2001, the white pagoda was listed among the "Major National Historical and Cultural Sites in Beijing" by the State Council of China.

On May 18, 2018, the Museum of Xihuang Temple was officially opened to the public.

== Architecture ==
Along the central axis are the Shanmen Hall, Hall of Four Heavenly Kings, Main Hall, Paifang, East Side Hall and West Side Hall.
