= Hepingjie Subdistrict =

Hepingjie Subdistrict 和平街街道
- Subdistrict
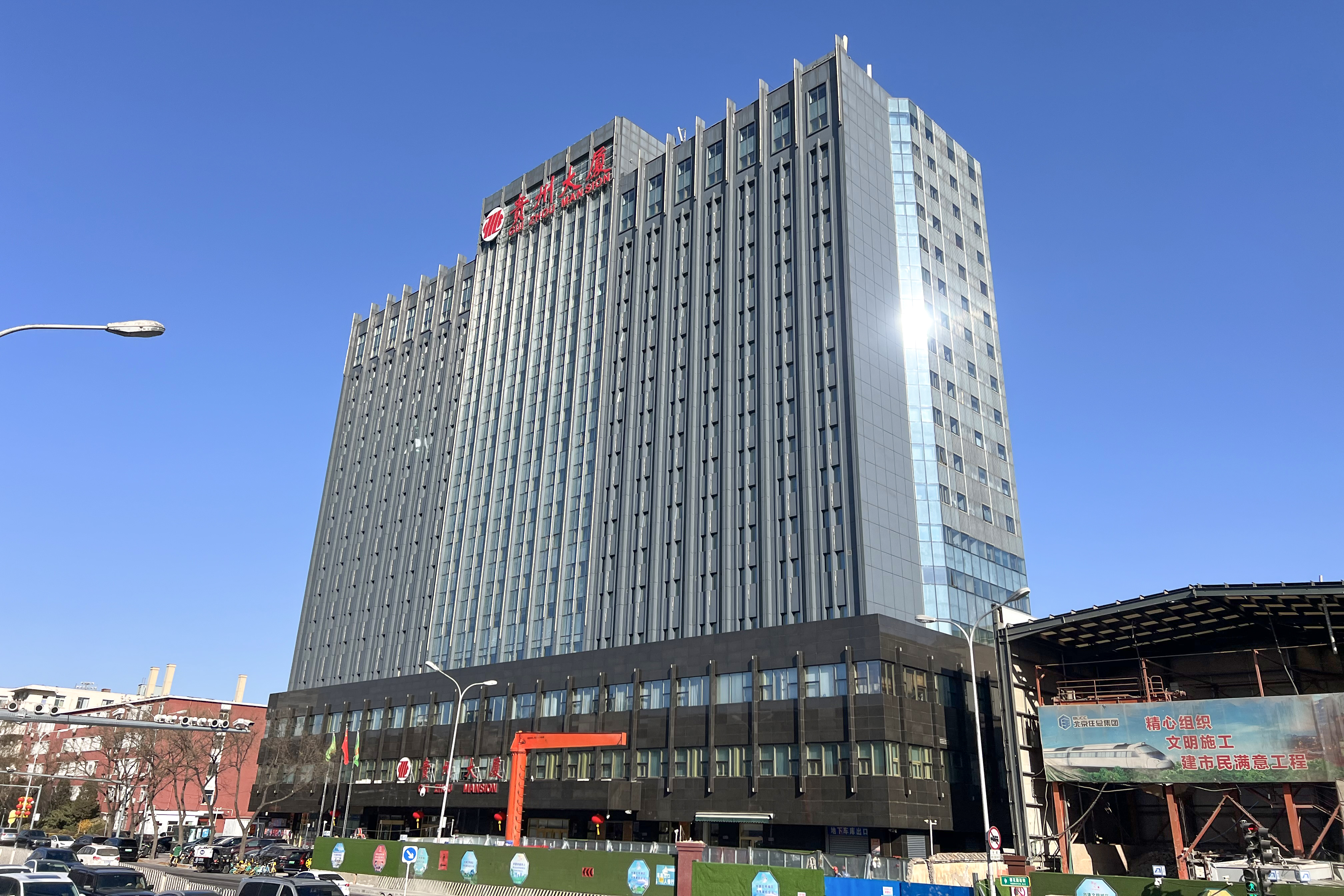
- Guizhou Mansion within the subdistrict, 2024

- Location within Beijing Location within China
- Coordinates: 39°57′41″N 116°25′04″E
- Country: China
- Municipality: Beijing
- District: Chaoyang

Area
  - Total: 4.54 km^{2} (1.75 sq mi)

Population (2020)
  - Total: 81,180
  - Density: 17,900/km^{2} (46,300/sq mi)
- Time zone: UTC+8 (China Standard)
- Postal code: 100029
- Area code: 010

Hepingjie Subdistrict (Chinese: 和平街街道; pinyin: Hépíngjiē Jiēdào) is a subdistrict on the northwestern side of Chaoyang District, Beijing, China. As of 2020, it has a total population of 81,180.

It was named after Heping (Chinese: 和平; lit. 'Peace') Street that was located within it.

== History ==
Hepingjie Subdistrict was established in 1956, when Xiaohuangzhuang and Wuluju Townships merged into Dongjiaoqu Wuluju Office, later changed to the current name in 1990.

== Administrative Division ==
As of 2021, the subdistrict has a total of 12 communities within its borders:

Administrative Division Code	Community Name in English	Community Name in Simplified Chinese
110105007039	Shengguzhuang	胜古庄
110105007040	Yinghuayuan	樱花园
110105007041	Hepingdongjie	和平东街
110105007042	Zhuangjiaolou	砖角楼
110105007043	Heping Jiayuan	和平家园
110105007044	Shisiqu	十四区
110105007045	Xiaohuangzhuang	小黄庄
110105007046	Meitan Kejiyuan	煤炭科技苑
110105007047	Shenggubei	胜古北
110105007048	Shenggunan	胜古南
110105007049	Heping Jiayuanbei	和平家园北
110105007050	Hepingxiyuan	和平西苑

== Landmark ==
- China Academy of Building Research
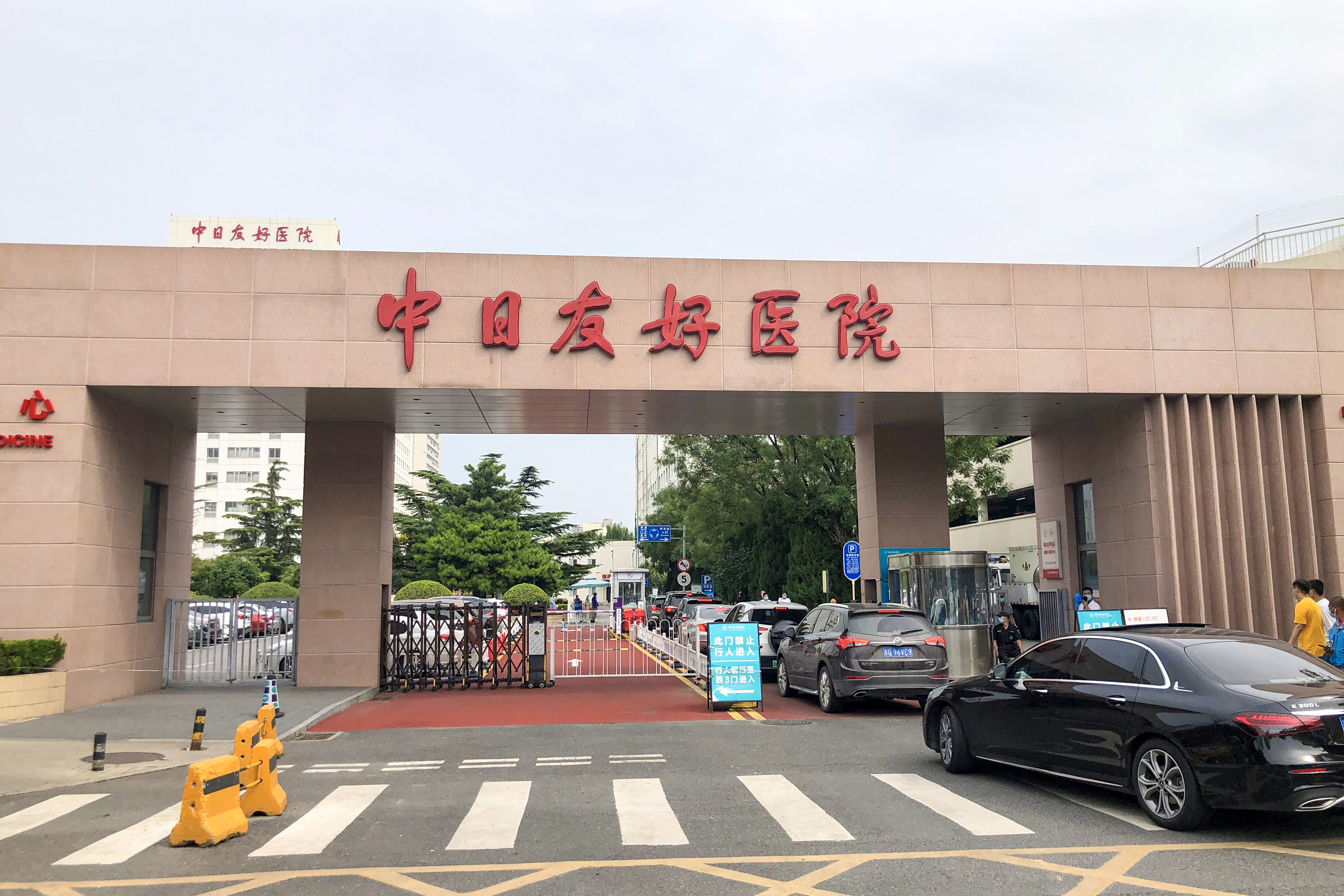
China-Japan Friendship Hospital, 2021

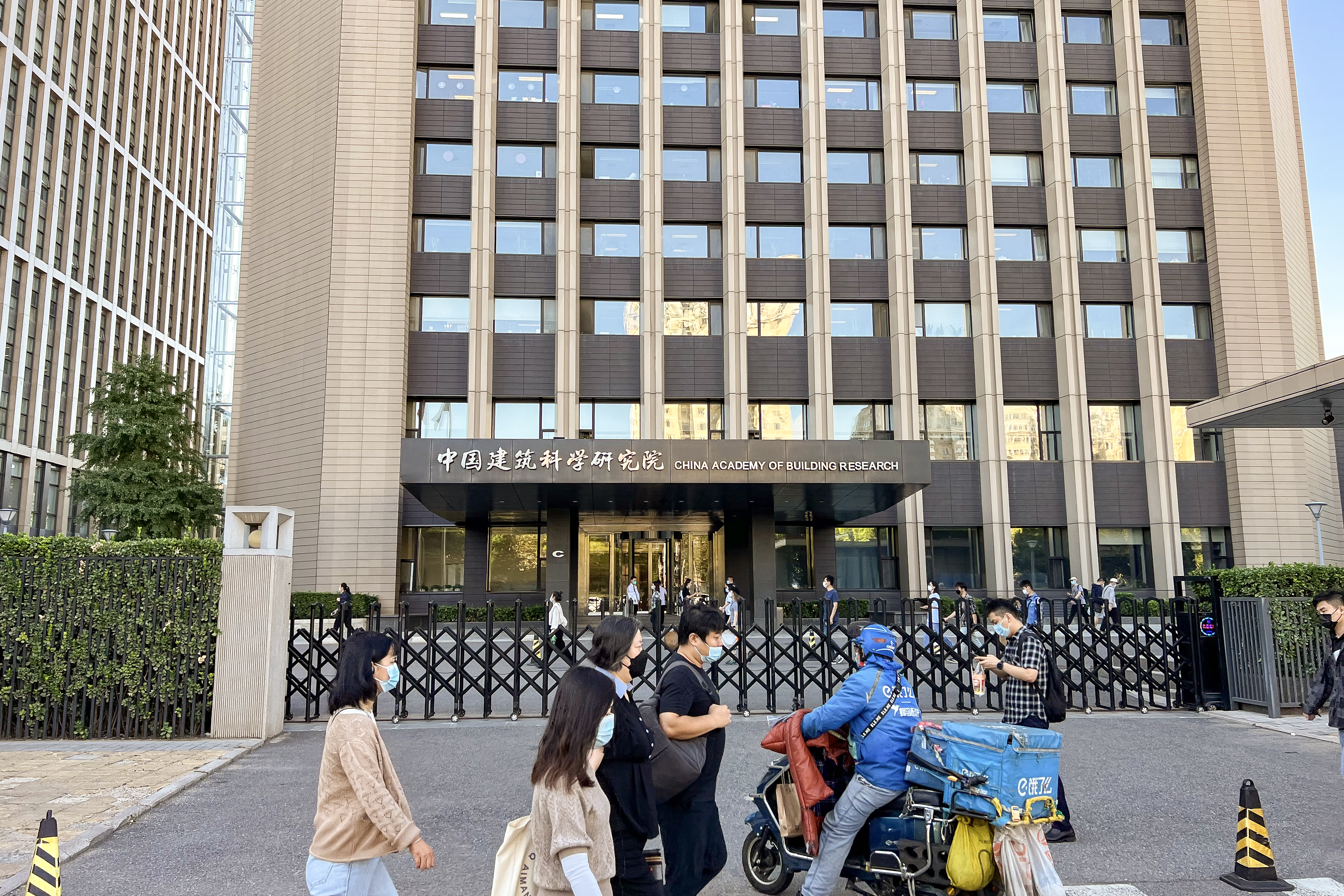
China Academy of Building Research, 2022

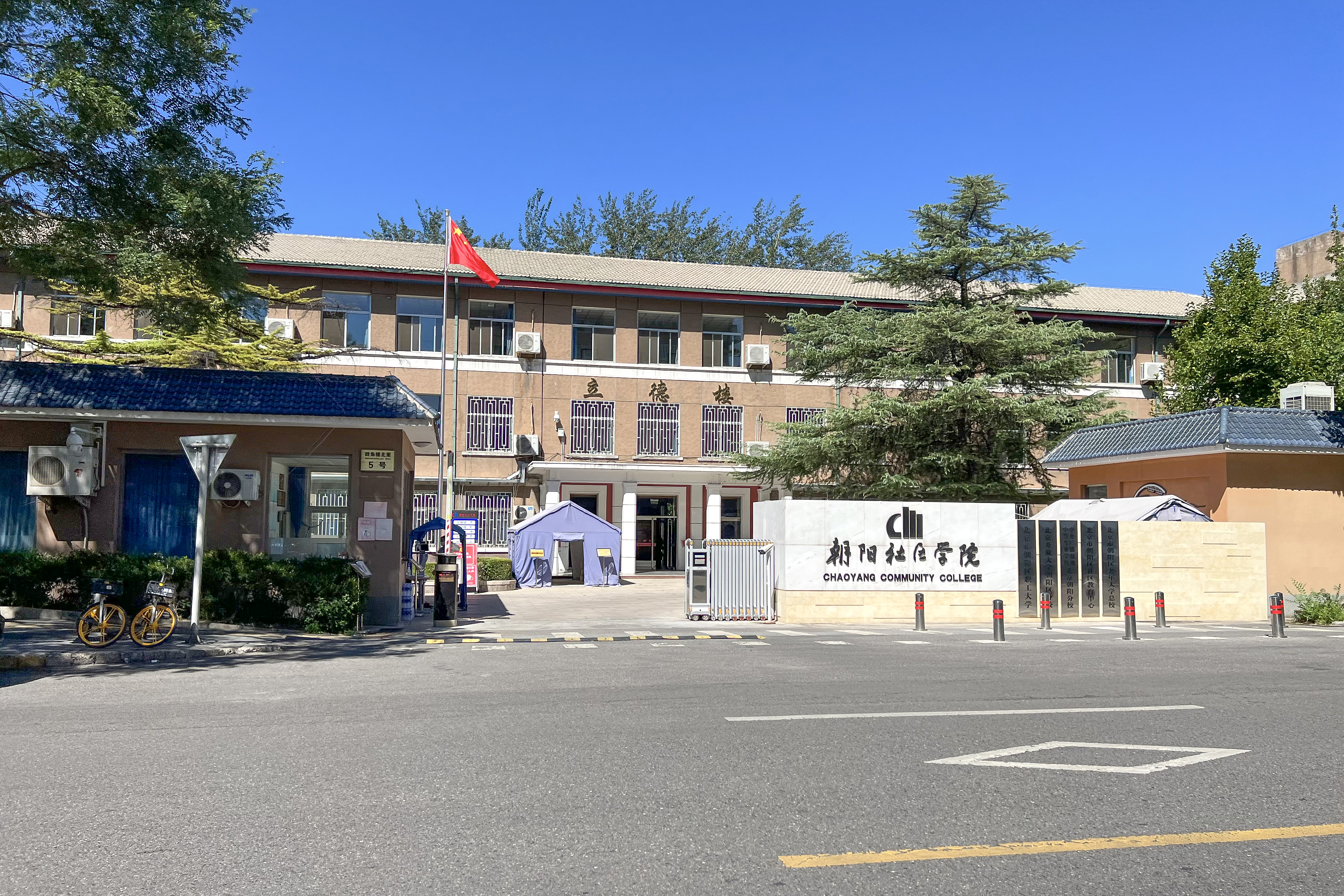
Chaoyang Community College, 2022

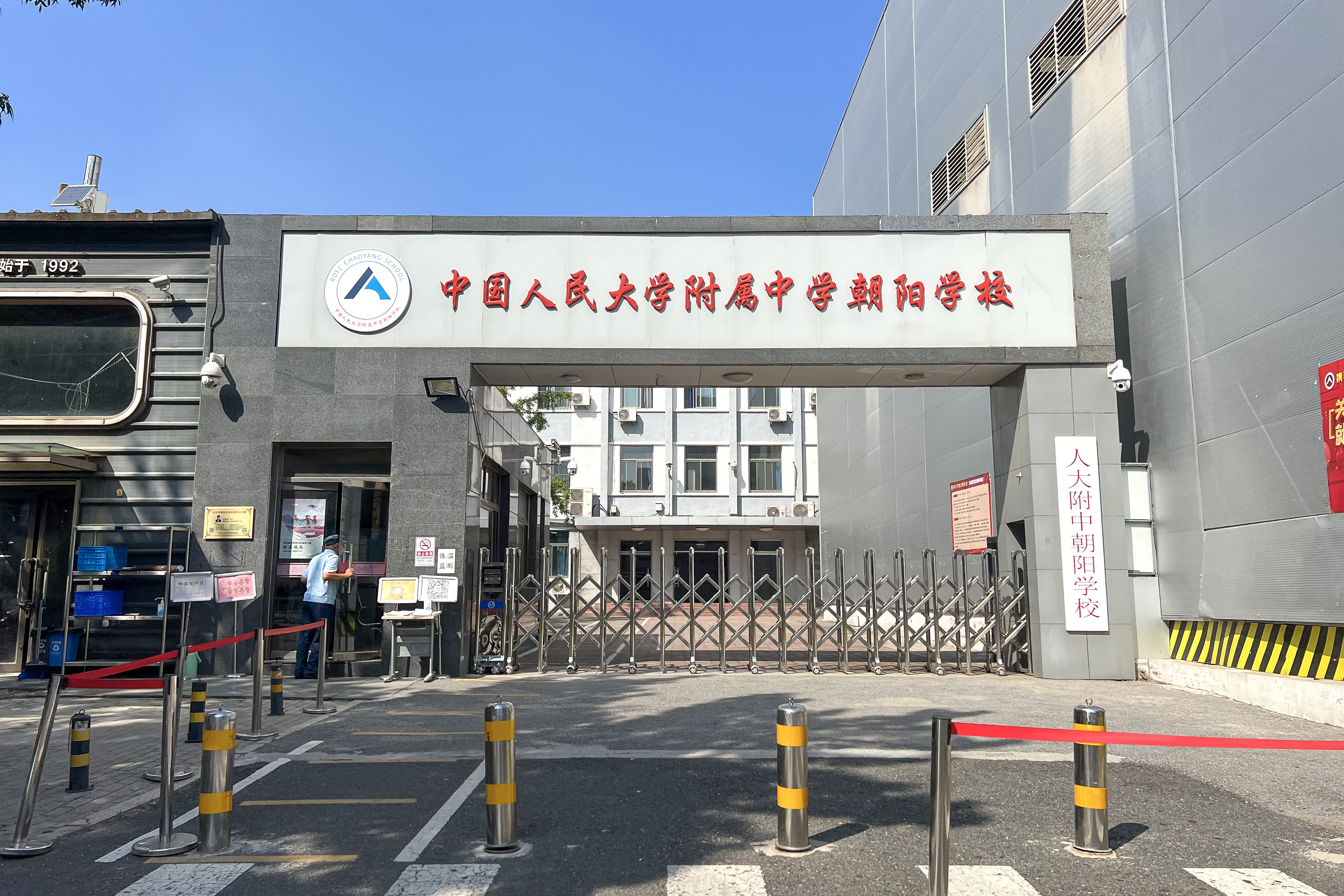
RDFZ Chaoyang School Heping Xiqiao Campus, 2022

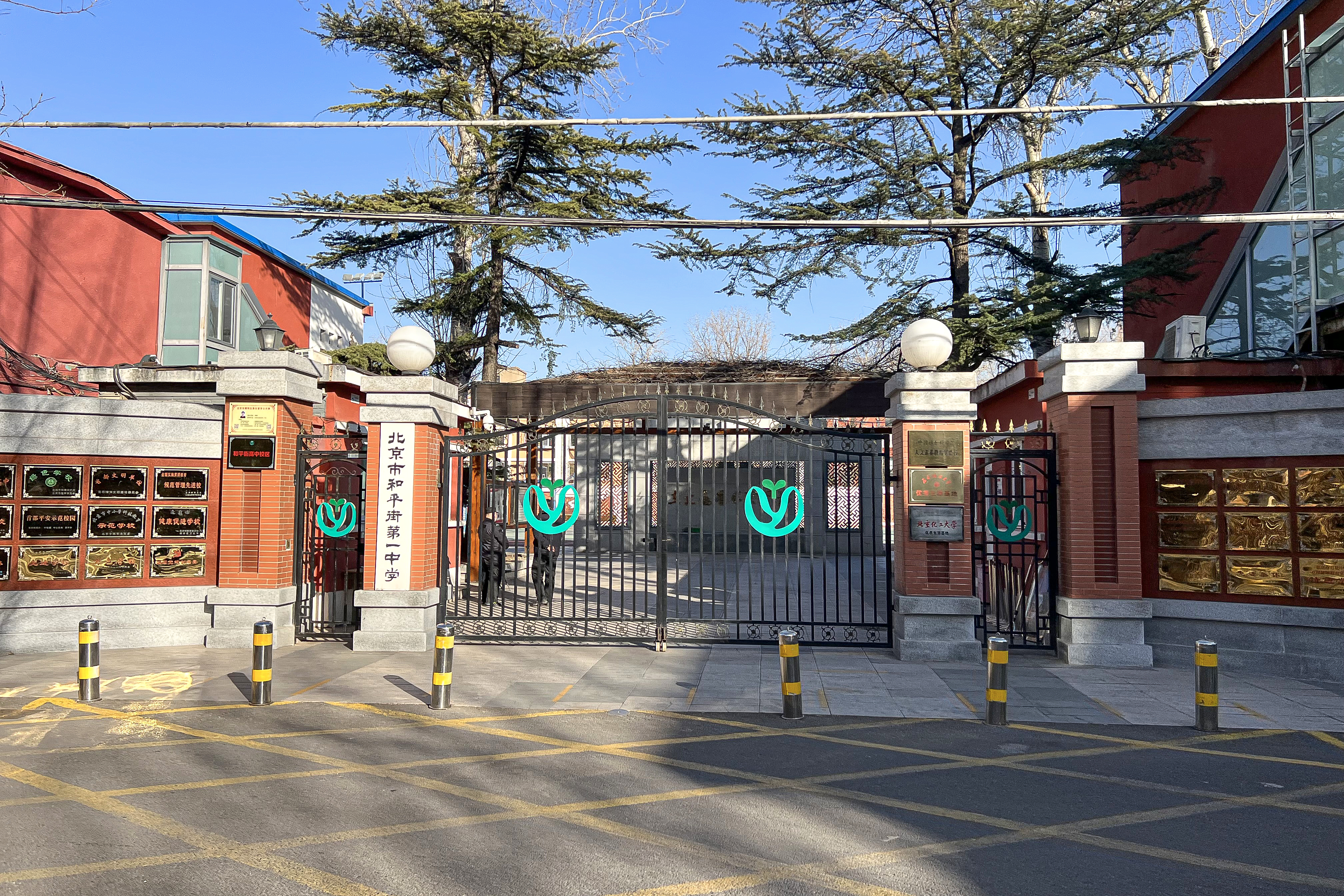
Beijing Hepingjie No. 1 Middle School, 2023
