= Dongcheng, Beijing =

Dongcheng 东城区
- District
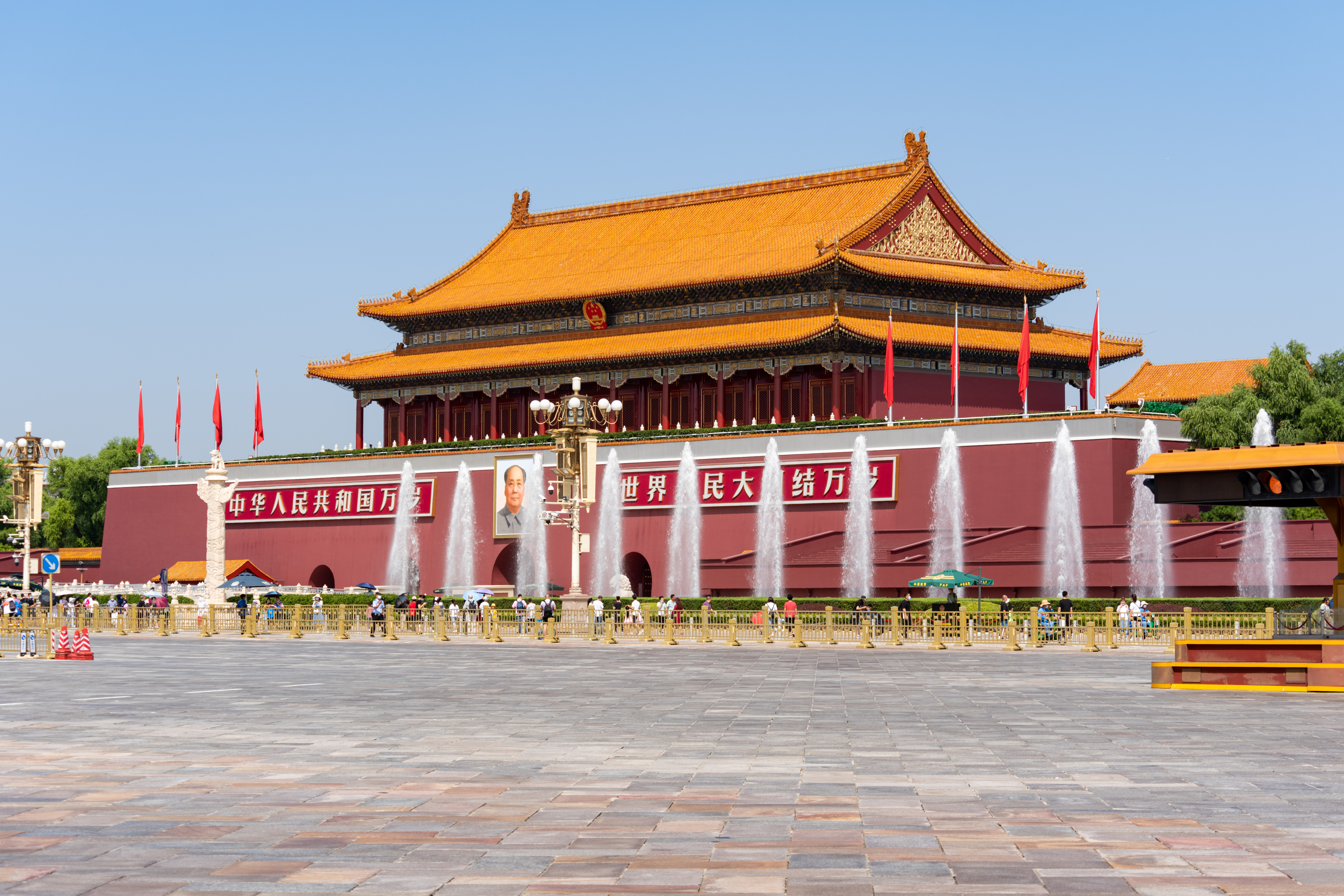
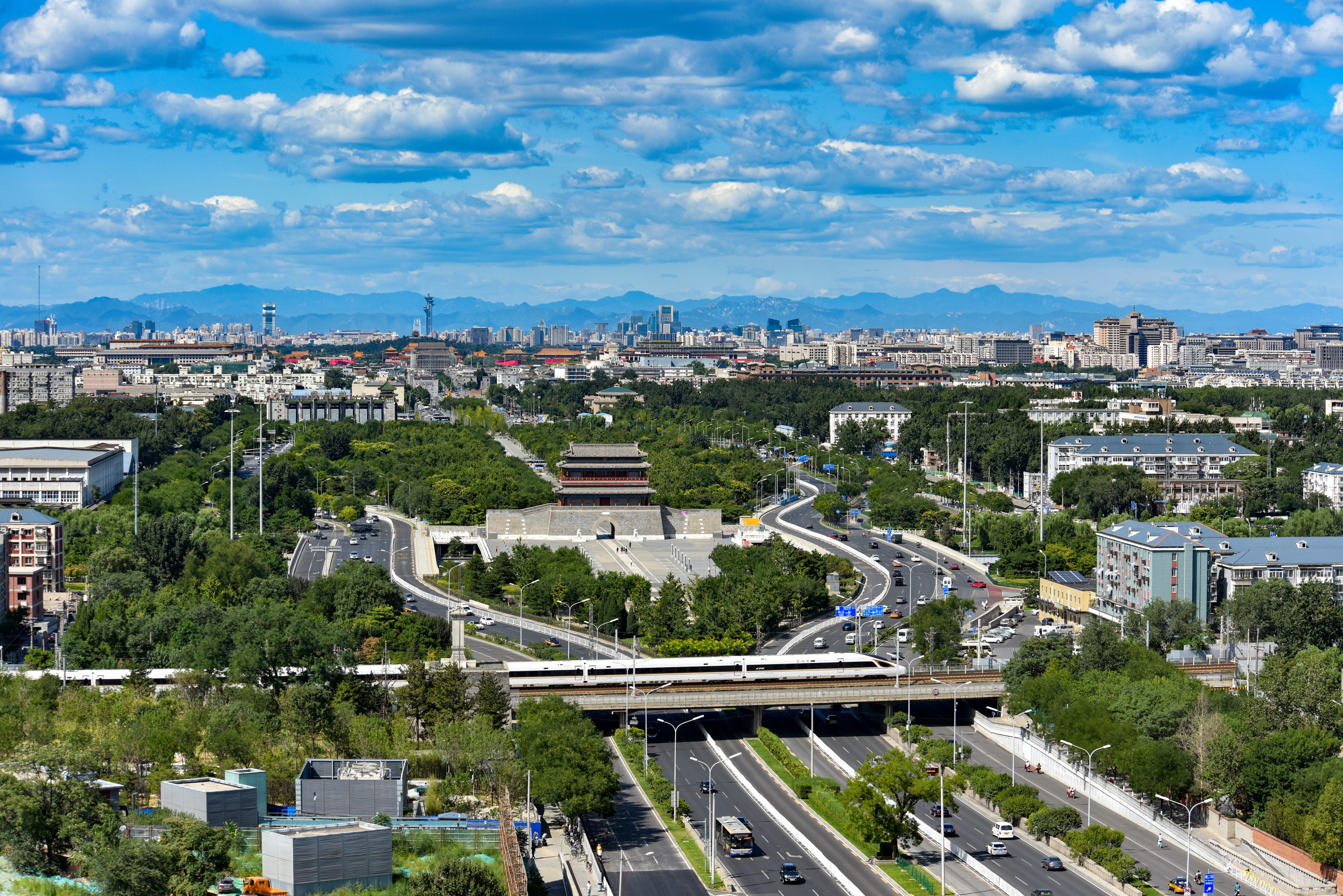
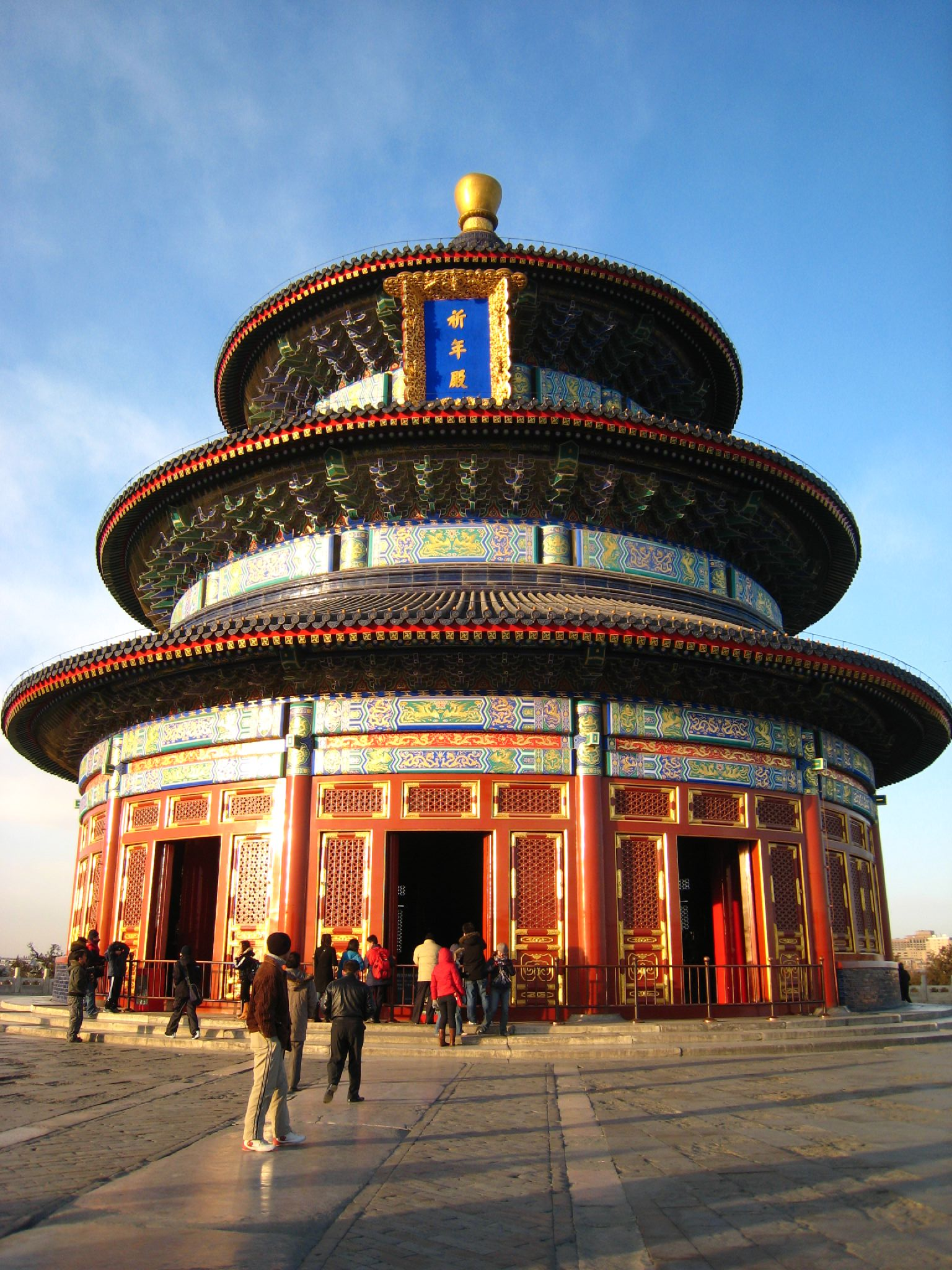
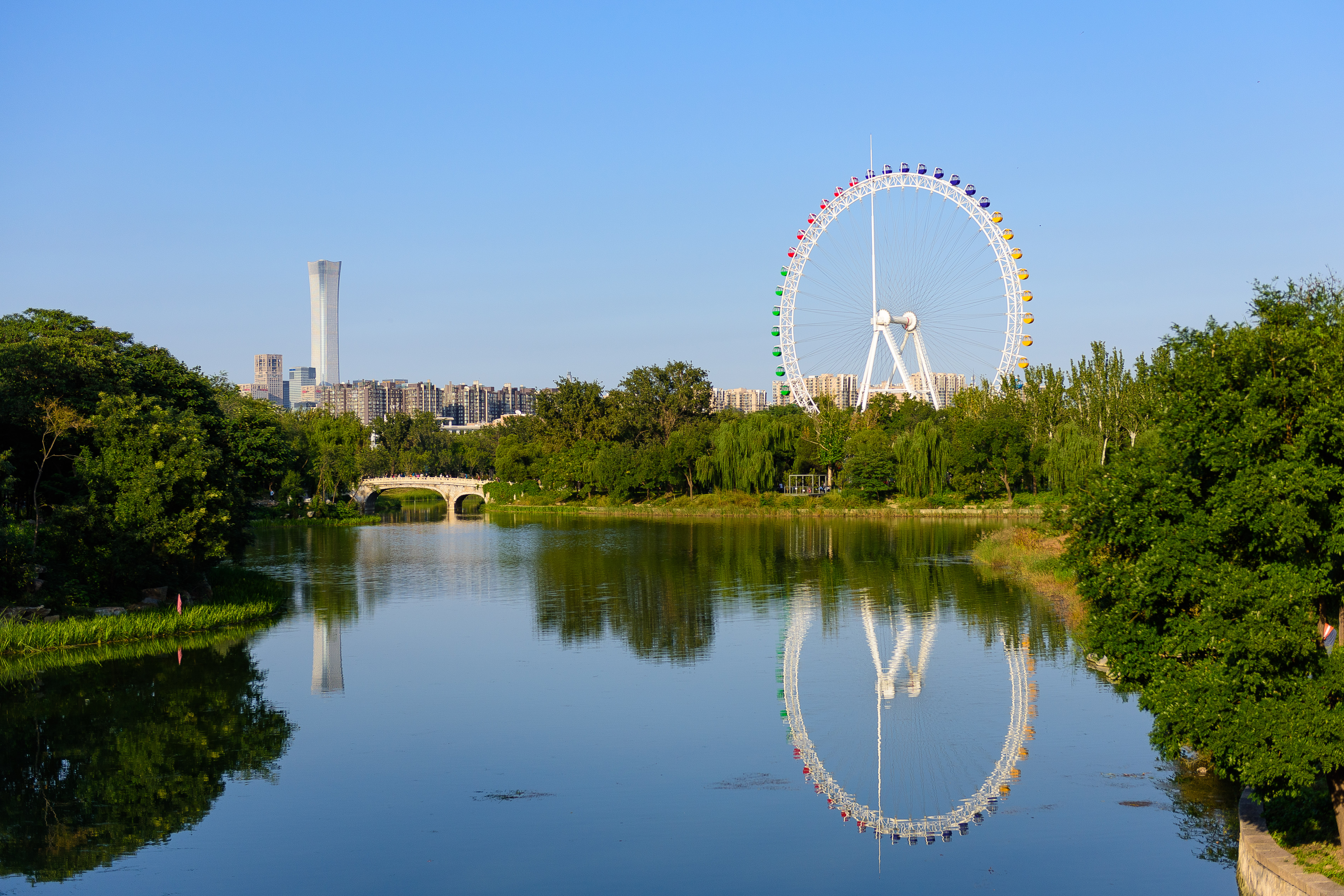
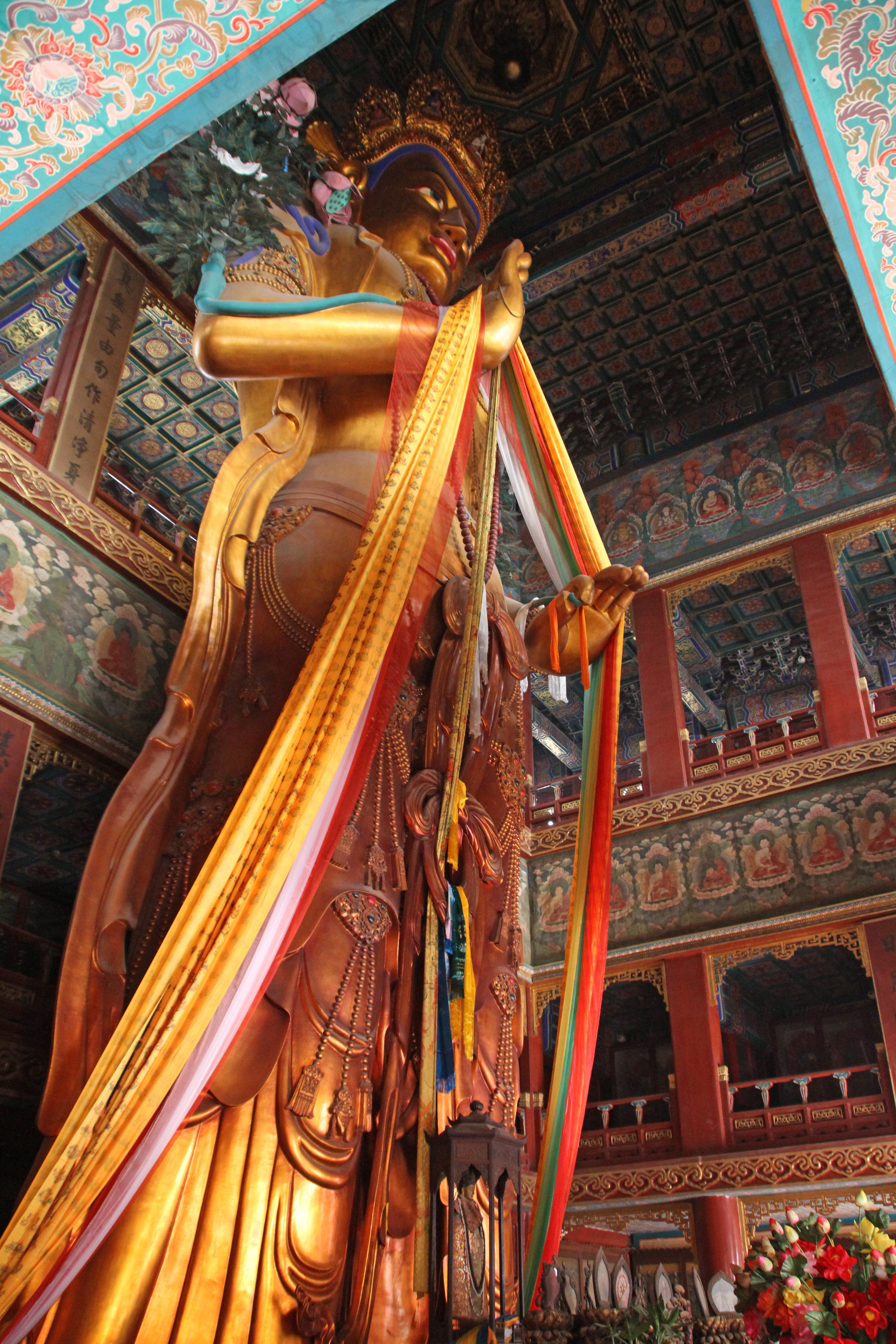
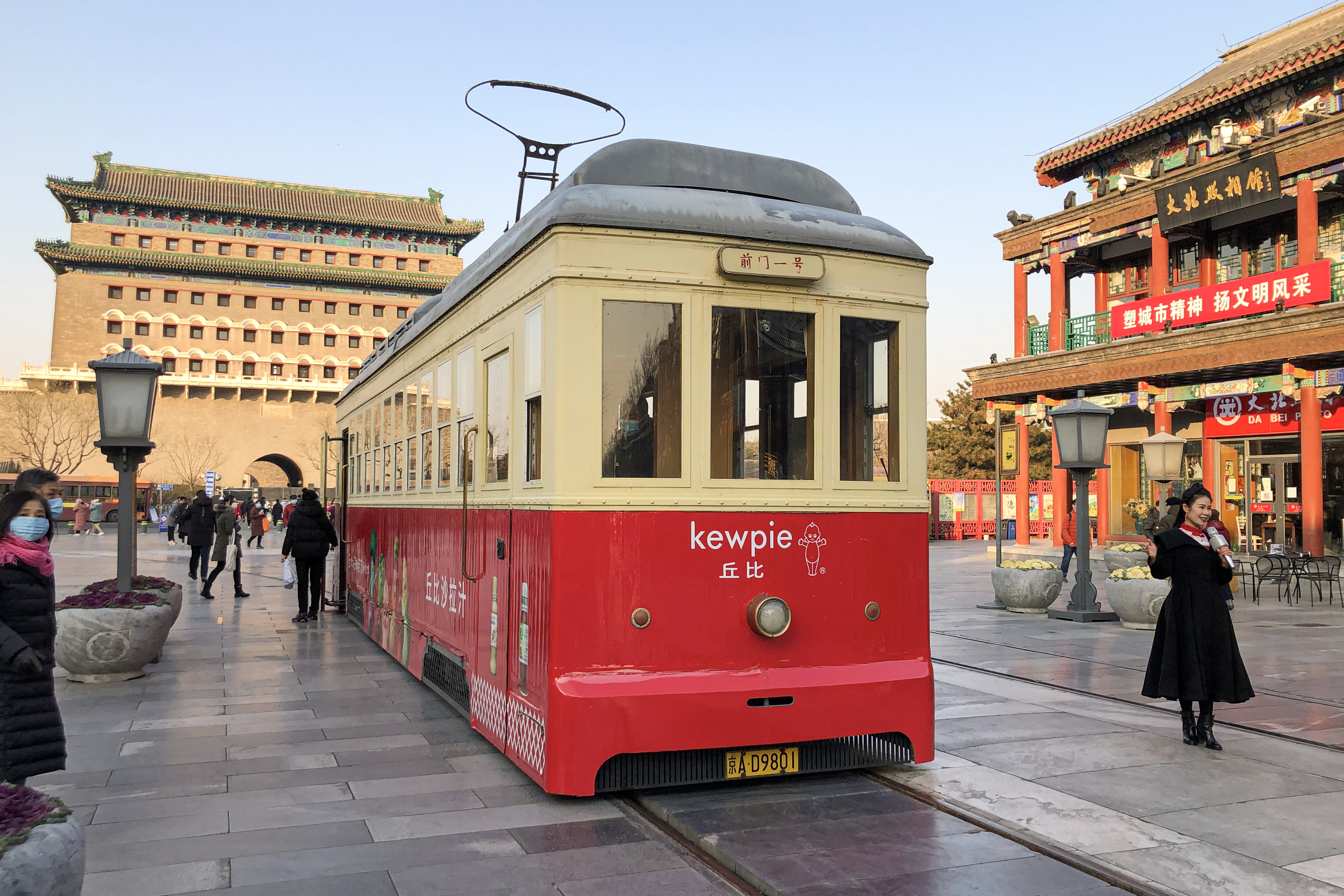
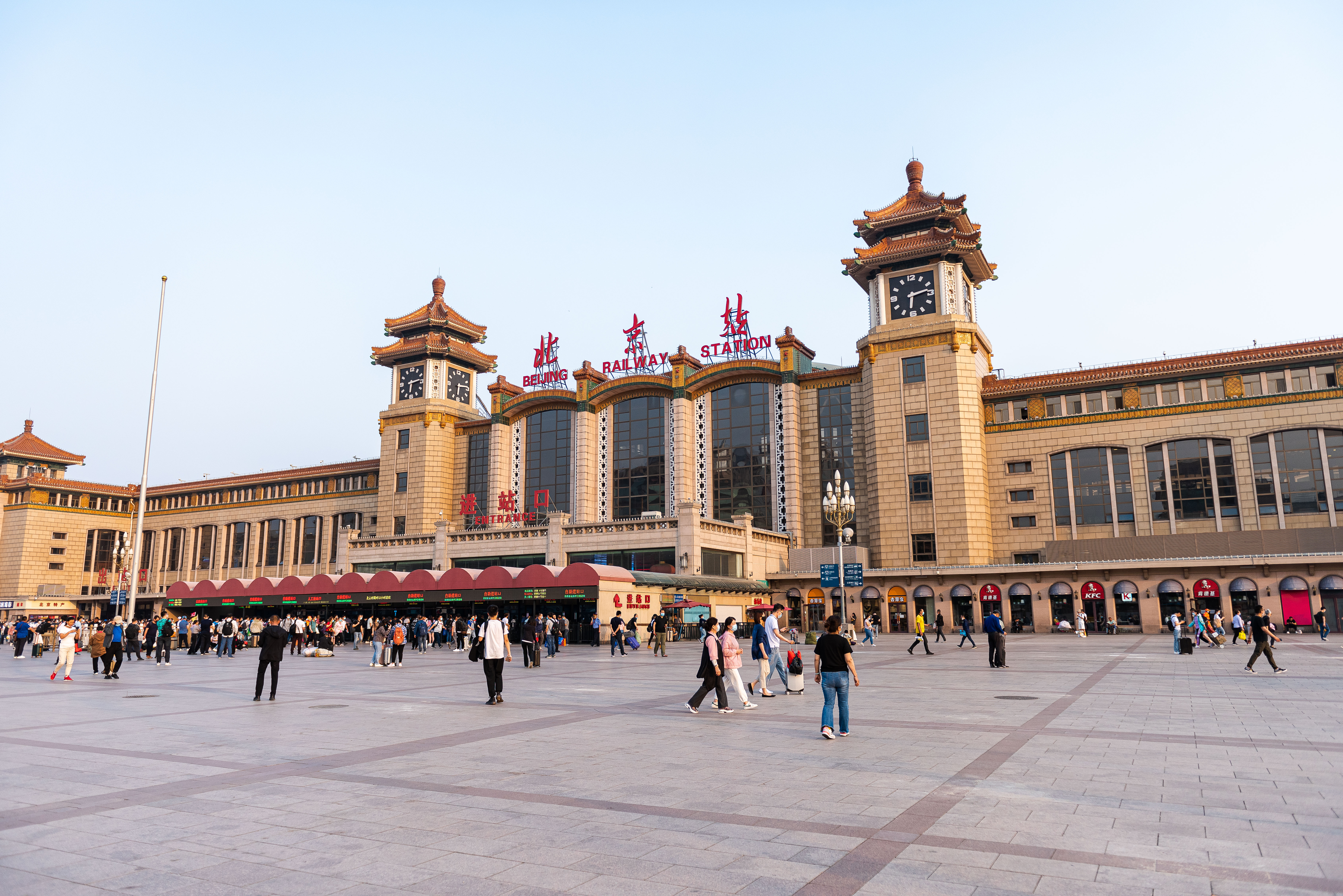
- Tian'anmen Yongdingmen Temple of Heaven Longtan Park Yonghe Temple Zhengyangmen Beijing Railway Station

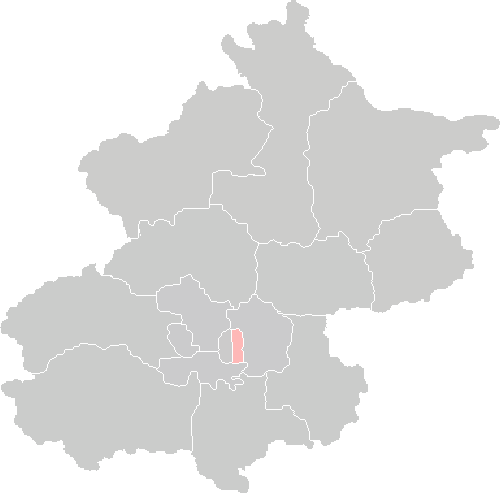
- Dongcheng District in Beijing
- Interactive map of Dongcheng
- Coordinates: 39°55′23″N 116°24′40″E
- Country: People's Republic of China
- Municipality: Beijing
- Township-level divisions: 17 subdistricts

Area
  - Total: 40.6 km^{2} (15.7 sq mi)

Population (2020 Census)
  - Total: 708,829
  - Density: 17,500/km^{2} (45,200/sq mi)
- Time zone: UTC+8 (China Standard)
- Postal code: 100010, 100061
- Area code: 0010
- Website: http://www.bjdch.gov.cn/

Dongcheng (Chinese: 东城区; pinyin: Dōngchéng Qū; lit. 'East City District') is a district of the city of Beijing. It covers the eastern half of Beijing's urban core region, including all of the eastern half of the Old City inside of the 2nd Ring Road with the northernmost extent crossing into the area within the 3rd Ring Road. Its 40.6 km^{2} (15.7 sq mi) area is further subdivided into 17 subdistricts.

Settlement in the area dates back over a millennium. It did not formally become a district of the city until the establishment of the Republic of China in 1911. The name Dongcheng was first given to it in a 1958 reorganization; it has existed in its current form since a 2010 merger with the former Chongwen to its south.

Dongcheng includes many of Beijing's major cultural attractions, such as the Forbidden City and Temple of Heaven, both UNESCO World Heritage Sites. More than a quarter of the city's Major National Historical and Cultural Sites are inside its boundaries, with a similar percentage of those protected at the municipal level. Tiananmen Square is also in Dongcheng, along with other popular destinations for domestic and international tourists such as the bars and nightlife in the hutongs of Nanluoguxiang and the shopping in Wangfujing. Over three-quarters of the district's economic activity is in the service sector.

== Geography ==
Dongcheng is often described, and depicted on simplified maps, as the eastern half of the area inside the 2nd Ring Road. However, the district boundaries include some areas outside it as well, particularly on the north and east. In the former direction a small projection crosses the 3rd Ring Road. The 2010 merger with Chongwen added some land beyond the Ring Road on the south.

=== Boundary ===
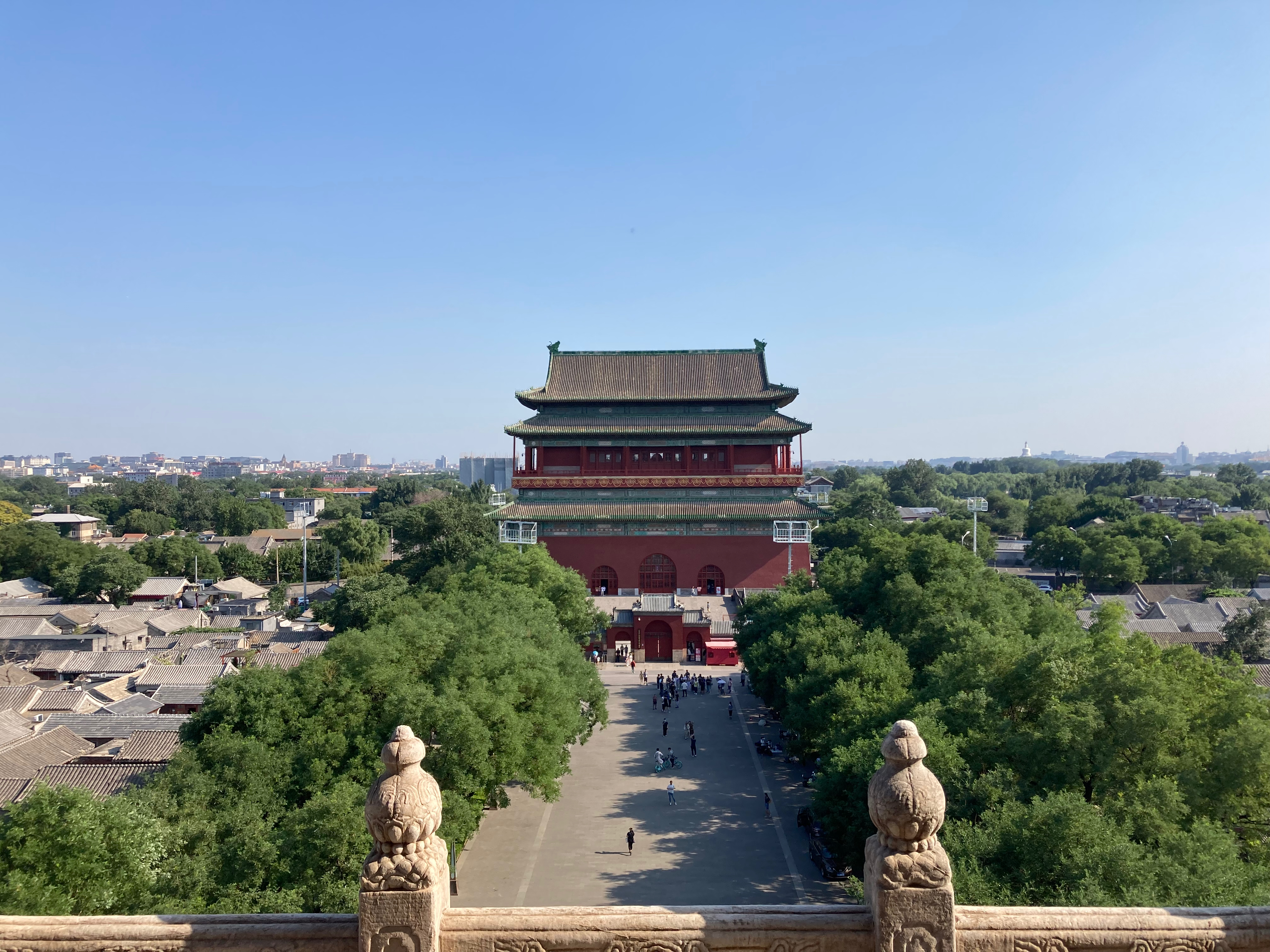
The Drum Tower, with Dongcheng District to the left

From Tiananmen at the north end of the eponymous square the district boundary follows West Chang'an Avenue to Chang Street, where it turns north, taking in Zhongshan Park as it follows the western moat of the Forbidden City. At Wenzhin Street it turns eastward to follow Jingshan Front Street between the Forbidden City and Jingshan Park. It resumes its northward course along Jingshan East Street, turning west along Jingshan Back Street, thus leaving all of Jingshan in Xicheng to the west.

At Di'anmen Inner Street it turns north again, following the east–west line that formally divided Beijing in the mid-15th century. After a short turn to the west at the Bell and Drum Towers along Gulou West Street, it resumes its northward course along Jiugulou Street, which it follows north for several kilometers, past the 2nd Ring Road to Andeli Street North, where it turns west. At the street's end, the edge of Rendinghu Park, it follows the park edge to the northeast.

The boundary turns east at Huangsi Street, following the rear property lines of buildings on the north side. It crosses the street again a block east of Gulou Outer Street, where it follows the northern edge of Liuyin Park. From the park's northeastern corner it goes due east to Andingmen Outer Street, where it turns north.

It continues north across the 3rd Ring Road for a kilometer to Jian'an East Road, where it turns east, just south of Yuan Dadu City Wall Ruins Park. This is the district's northernmost section, bordering on Chaoyang. After 500m, it zigzags south, southeast and then west again along local streets to Shenggu Middle Road. There it turns south and crosses the Ring Road again, continuing on Xiaohangzhuang North Street. Another zigzag takes it along Xiaohangzhuang, Xinghua, and Qingniangou roads to Heipingli East Street, where it turns south, to turn east again along Heiplingli North Street.

At Jiaolin Alley it turns south again, following another irregular path through the neighborhoods here to just east of Minwang Hutong. At the river paralleling the Second Ring Road on its north, it turns east briefly to follow that, cross under the Airport Expressway along Xiangheyuan Middle Street. A short section detours north to take in some of the buildings on the north side of Xiangheyuan Road, after which it returns to what is now Xiangheyuan North Street.

Turning southeast along Zuojiazhuang West Street, the boundary turns to follow the north bank of the Landmark River eastward at the Chunxiu Road intersection. The river bends to the east and then southeast, where a short tributary comes in 200 m west of Chunxiu. It follows that back to Chunxiu at its intersection with Dongzhimen Outer Street.

Rejoining Chunxiu, the boundary stays with it for another 1 km (0.62 mi) to Beijing Workers' Stadium, where it becomes Workers' Stadium West Road, with Workers Indoor Arena on the east side. At Dongyingfang Hutong, it turns west again. Following Jishikou East Road north for a block, then turning west on Panjiapao Hutong, a brief northward turn at Dongzhong Street brings it back to the Second Ring Road via Fuhua Dasha South Street.

From that point the boundary largely follows the ring road south, with a few diversions to take in all of the exit ramps at the Jianguomen Street interchange and some open land at the Tonghui River to its south. At Longtan Park in the southeast corner of the district, it curves west with the road to form the district's southern boundary with Fengtai. Just past the Temple of Heaven Park, in the Yongdingmen area, it leaves the ring road to take in a roughly triangular area to the south that includes the Beijing South railway station at its eastern corner.

It then follows Yongdingmen, Tianqiao, and Qianmen streets due north back to the southern end of Tian'anmen Square. There it turns west briefly, then goes up the square's west road between the China Numismatic Museum and the Great Hall of the People. At the square's north end is West Chang'an Avenue.

=== Buildings and geography ===
Like most of Beijing, the district is consistently level, with an elevation of 30–50 metres (98–164 ft) above sea level, reflecting the city's location on the North China Plain. There are a few significant bodies of water, all lakes in parks—Liuyin Lake in that park and Youth Lake in Qingnianhu Park, both in the district's northern portion, and Dragon Lake in Longtan Park at the district's southeast corner. On the west central edge is the moat surrounding the Forbidden City. The Nanchang River, heavily channelized from its days as the once-walled city's north moat, flows across the district's north, with the South Moat paralleling the 2nd Ring Road along its southern boundary. Along the southern edge of the Forbidden City another small stream, the Changpu River, flows above ground for a kilometer.

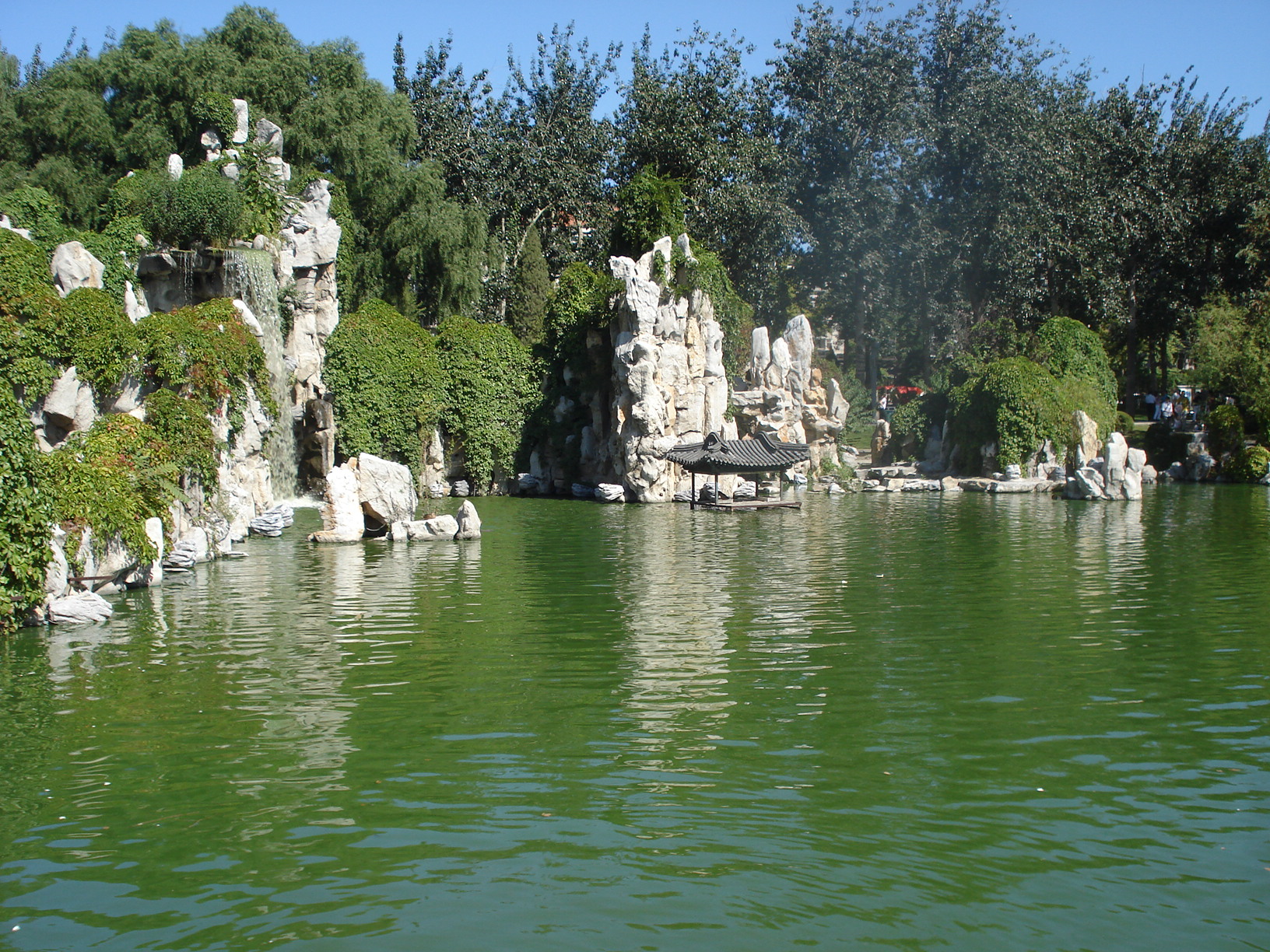
Dragon Lake in Longtan Park

Much of the district is densely developed, with major streets following a grid plan, while the side streets connecting them are irregular. Temple of Heaven Park is the largest, at 267 hectares (660 acres), with the 42.7-hectare (106-acre) Temple of Earth Park in the Hepingli Subdistrict in second. In addition to the parks already mentioned, others of note include Dongdan Park off that street in the central area of the district and Nanguan Park near the northeast corner. Some major arteries also have wide planted median strips. The Russian embassy complex just inside the Ring Road at the northeast corner of the district also has another large planted area, although it is fenced off.

The most significant non-park urban open space in the district is the 44-hectare (110-acre) Tiananmen Square at its west central point. It is a stone-paved pedestrian area with the Monument to the People's Heroes and Zhengyang Gate bracketing its one building, the Mausoleum of Mao Zedong. To the square's immediate north the 72-hectare (180-acre) Forbidden City complex also has many vast courtyards. At the east end, the Workers' Gymnasium has some large paved areas and open lawns in its vicinity. There is also a large open plaza in front of the Beijing railway station.

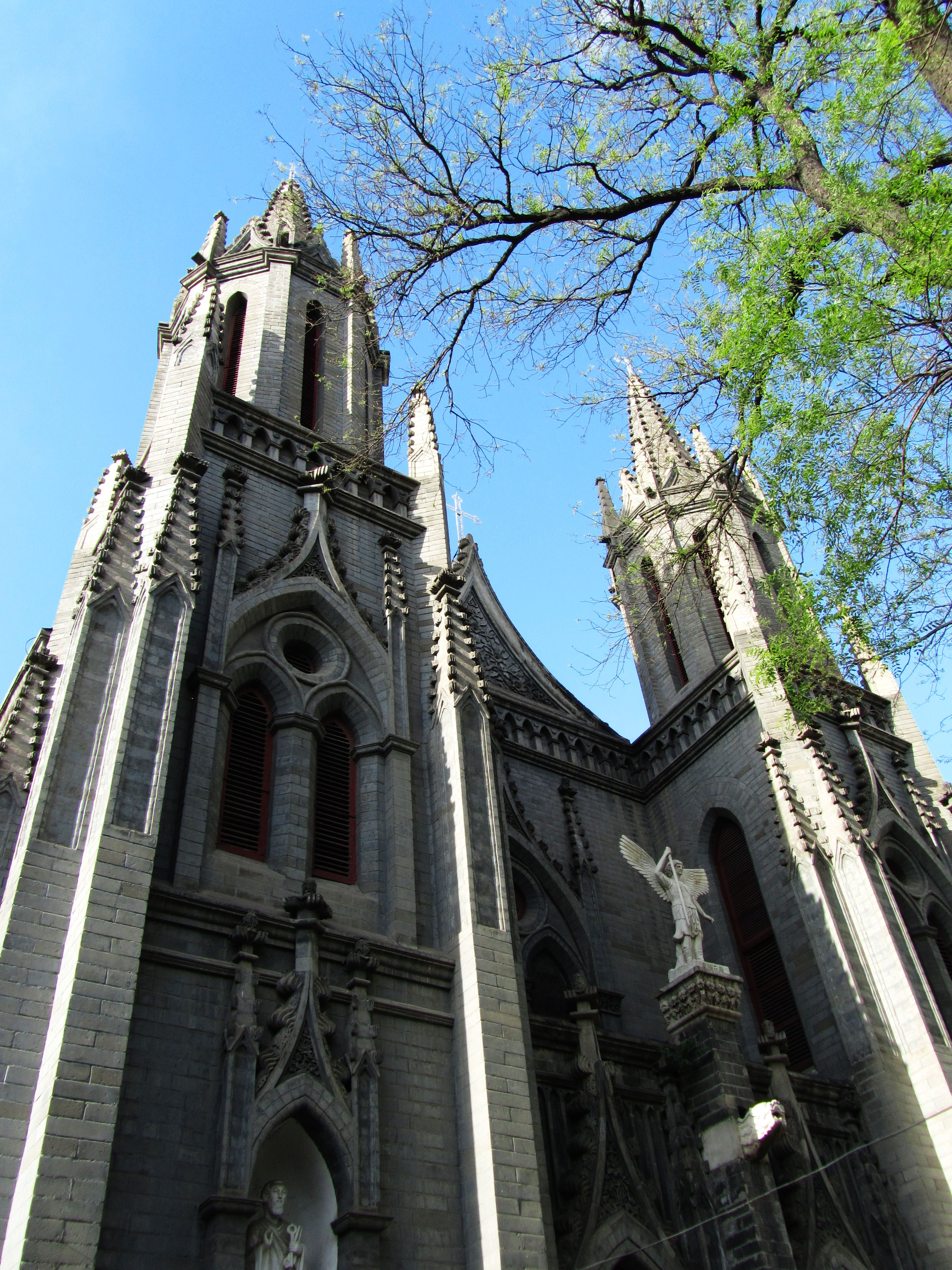
St. Michael's Church, a Gothic Revival structure in the Legation Quarter

Architecture in the district varies greatly. It ranges in form from the small one and two-story ancient stone houses in the siheyuan plan, that line the district's many hutongs, the narrow, winding lanes that make up many neighborhoods on the side streets, to taller modern office buildings and hotels. Styles include the traditional Chinese architecture of the 15th-century imperial buildings in the Forbidden City and the various temples, the fin-de-siècle European revival styles in the Legation Quarter to the modern styles of today's newest buildings. The district has over a quarter of Beijing's Major National Historical and Cultural Sites, and a similar portion of its municipal-level heritage listings. Two of those, the Forbidden City and Temple of Heaven, are further inscribed as UNESCO World Heritage Sites.

== History ==
Map of Beijing's city walls during the imperial period. Dongcheng is the area at upper right of the green rectangle

Dongcheng's history dates back over a millennium, long predating the city's current boundaries. Settlement of the area between the city's inner and outer walls began during the Liao dynasty in the 10th century C.E., when small hamlets began to form outside the northeastern corner of what was then the city (now the Forbidden City). Growth continued through the Jin dynasty, which succeeded the Liao in the 12th century.

Under the Jin, the area first became known as the northeastern part of the capital, then known as Zhongdu. When Kublai Khan established the Yuan dynasty later in the century, he rebuilt the city and renamed it Dadu. As part of that project, the future Dongcheng district's boundaries were first officially drawn, although they were different from today's.

The Yongle emperor, Zhu Di, third of the Ming dynasty, took the throne at the beginning of the 15th century. He built the present-day Forbidden City, now part of Dongcheng, as his palace inside the walls of the original city. Outside it, Dongcheng had 15 lanes at that time, the beginnings of its many hutongs.

During the Ming and Qing dynasties, the area began to become a desirable residence for both government officials and the merchants who sold to them, due to its proximity to the palace. They built themselves the siheyuan courtyard-style houses that remain a valued part of the district's cultural heritage. The Qings stationed four divisions of their army in the district, which was officially at the time part of Daxing County (now a district south of the city).

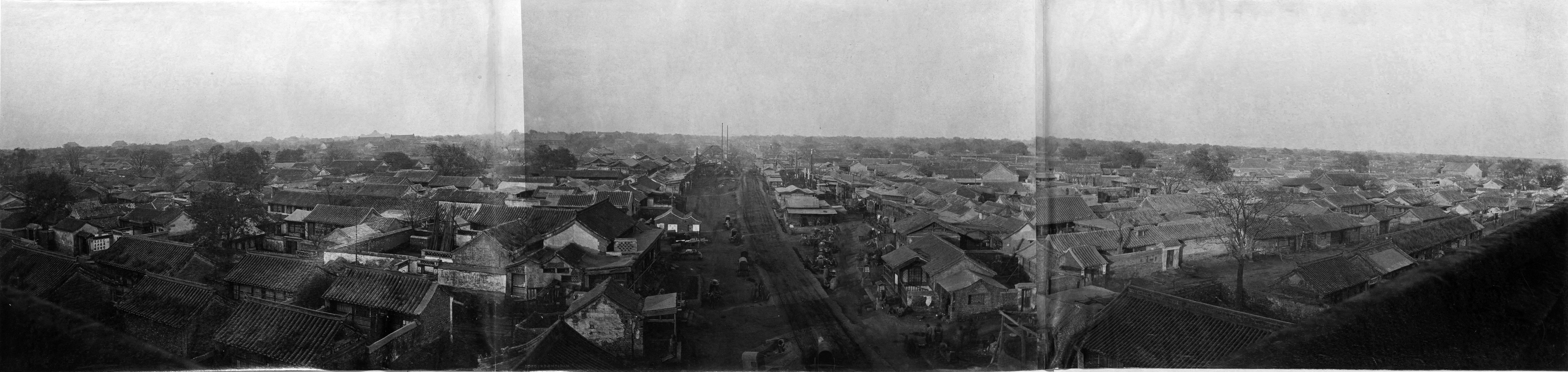
Panorama of Beijing City taken from Chongwenmen c. 1879. The road below is Chongwenmen Inner Street. In the left of the picture, we can see Forbidden City, Hill of Jingshan and White Dagoba near the horizon. Residential houses in the left below were torn down not long after the picture were taken to make room for the construction of Legation Quarter according to Article 7 of Boxer Protocol.

The overthrow of the Qings and the establishment of the Republic of China in the wake of the Xinhai Revolution of 1911 led to the area northeast of the Forbidden City being opened to the public for the first time. Under the government of the new Republic of China, the districts of Beijing were reorganized. Today's Dongcheng was known as the inner first and inner third districts.

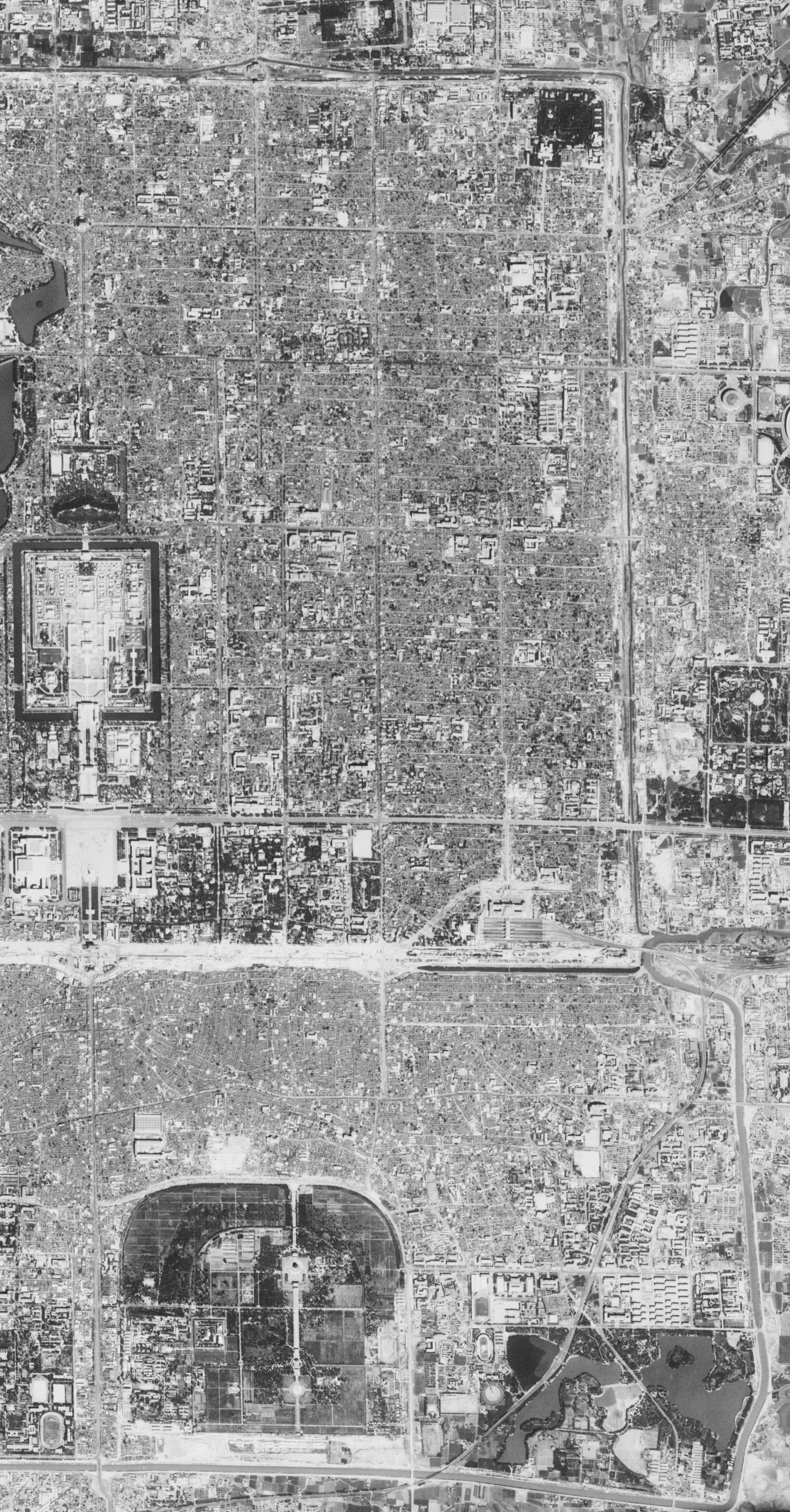
Satellite image of Dongcheng District in September 1967

Four decades later, the Communist victory in the Chinese Civil War led to the People's Republic of China displacing the Republic as the sovereign government of mainland China. This had two effects on Dongcheng. First, the two districts in the area were renamed Dongsi and Dongdan, corresponding to streets that still exist in the northern and central portions of the district, in 1952; six years later the two were merged and renamed Dongcheng. That district was then merged with the Chongwen District to its south in 2010.

Secondly, many of the wealthy siheyuan residents fled to Taiwan or elsewhere in anticipation of the Communist victory and the likely expropriation of their property; those who remained or did not leave in time indeed suffered that fate. The new government subdivided many of the houses in order to deliver on its promise of better housing for the working class, and the neighborhood culture of the hutongs was sustained. However, the increased wealth in China created by the reform and opening up of the late 20th century, following the Tiananmen Square protests of 1989, put pressure on Beijing's city government to demolish hutongs in Dongcheng and elsewhere. They were perceived as architecturally undistinguished substandard slums that could not be fully modernized, to be replaced by urban renewal projects such as the Oriental Plaza mall complex that would impress visitors to the 2008 Summer Olympics.

Often many poorer residents found themselves displaced, unable to afford the luxury housing that replaced their demolished homes. In the 1990s it was estimated that 40% of Beijing's Old City, which includes Dongcheng, had been demolished; some predictions suggest that if demolition continues at its current pace, eventually 90% of the Old City will be gone. Efforts by preservationists to protect the hutongs were only partly successful, and developers and officials often ignored them. A battle over the city's proposed redevelopment of South Chizi Street, alongside the Forbidden City's southeast corner, at first attracted attention due to its high-visibility location, but ultimately only nine of over 200 siheyuans in the blocks east of the street escaped demolition. They have been replaced by architecturally sympathetic new construction that is among the most expensive housing in the city.

== Government ==
Dongcheng is run by several committees. The District Committee of the Chinese Communist Party (CCP) is its local organization. The District People's Congress is responsible for most major decisions, as well as implementing national and local laws and regulations. Its members, all appointed by the CCP, elect their leadership and local officials. The People's Government, composed of several local commissions, makes local laws and enforces administrative policy. Lastly, the district committee of the Chinese People's Political Consultative Conference serves an advisory function. All four committees are headed by chairs, appointed by the CCP to five-year terms.

While most of China's major government bodies are headquartered in the neighboring Xicheng District, there are a hundred lesser ones in offices throughout Dongcheng. Two major agencies in the district are the Civil Aviation Administration of China (CAAC), which occupies a large building on Dongsi Street, and the China Maritime Safety Administration, on Jianguomen Inner Avenue. The Beijing Municipal Public Security Bureau is also headquartered in Dongcheng, as is the China International Development Cooperation Agency (China Aid).

== Economy ==
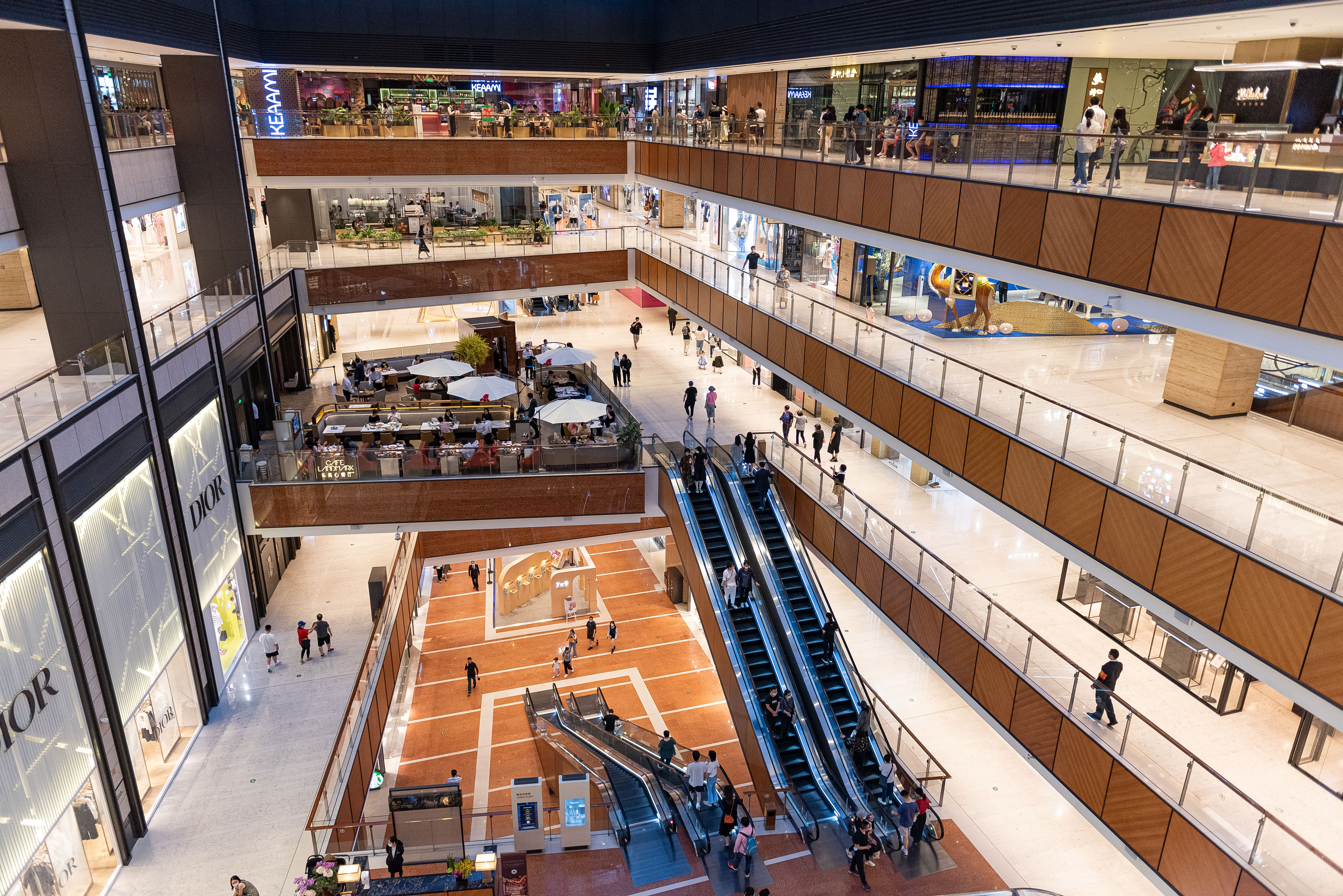
Interior of WF Central Mall

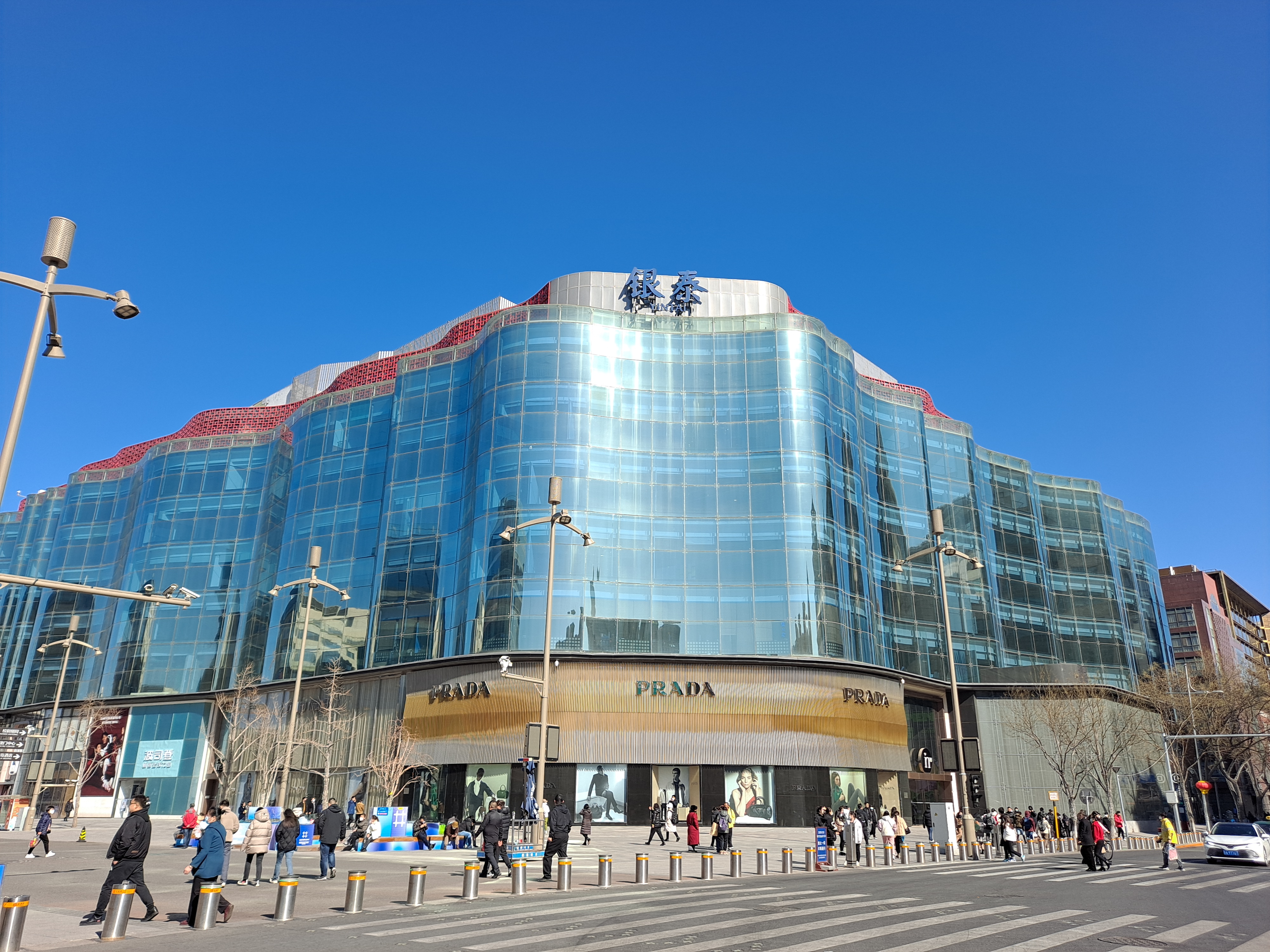
Wangfujing

In 2017, the regional GDP of the district was 392.07 billion yuan, with GDP per capita at 321.4 thousand yuan.

Owing to its many tourist attractions, much of Dongcheng's economy is in the service sector, which in 2001 accounted for 88% of the district's share of China's gross domestic product. Foreign direct investment at that time was estimated to be US$247.6 million, and rising. Dongcheng is home to some of Beijing's most prestigious hotels, like the Beijing Hotel complex and the nearby Grand Hyatt on East Chang'an Avenue near Tiananmen Square. Near those hotels are the shopping opportunities of the Malls at Oriental Plaza, once Asia's largest, and the Wangfujing pedestrian mall, a big draw for domestic tourists. Further to the north younger Beijingers and foreigners often visit the hutongs of Nanluogoxiang, east of the Bell and Drum Towers, for its bar and nightlife offerings.

While most of Beijing's major corporate buildings are located in the city's central business district in the Chaoyang District to Dongcheng's north and east, some are within the district. China National Petroleum Corporation and subsidiary PetroChina share one headquarters facility just inside the district at the Chaoyangmen intersection along the 2nd Ring Road. Air Koryo has an office in the Swissôtel Beijing in Dongcheng District.

Beijing's current master plan designates Dongcheng as one of the city's four core zones. To enhance the district's combination of commercial and cultural attractions, it calls for giving priority to service and high-tech industries within it. Three areas in particular are singled out for attention—Wangfujing, the eastern portion of the 2nd Ring Road, and the High Technology Park near the Lama Temple at Yonghegong Road and the Ring Road. The plan also calls for the "preservation of the city's historic landscape and renovation of dilapidated houses." Tax credits are available to eligible businesses that generate at least a half a million renminbi in contributions in their first years of operation in the district.

== Administrative divisions ==
The district contains 17 subdistricts:

Name	Chinese (S)	Hanyu Pinyin	Population (2010)	Area (km^{2})
Jingshan Subdistrict	景山街道	Jǐngshān Jiēdào	40,308	1.64
Donghuamen Subdistrict	东华门街道	Dōnghuámén Jiēdào	61,366	5.35
Jiaodaokou Subdistrict	交道口街道	Jiāodàokǒu Jiēdào	49,196	1.45
Andingmen Subdistrict	安定门街道	Āndìngmén Jiēdào	44,358	1.76
Beixinqiao Subdistrict	北新桥街道	Běixīnqiáo Jiēdào	82,273	2.62
Dongsi Subdistrict	东四街道	Dōngsì Jiēdào	43,731	1.53
Chaoyangmen Subdistrict	朝阳门街道	Cháoyángmén Jiēdào	36,702	1.24
Jianguomen Subdistrict	建国门街道	Jiànguómén Jiēdào	57,170	2.70
Dongzhimen Subdistrict	东直门街道	Dōngzhímén Jiēdào	46,018	2.07
Hepingli Subdistrict	和平里街道	Hépínglǐ Jiēdào	112,058	5.02
Qianmen Subdistrict	前门街道	Qiánmén Jiēdào	12,924	1.10
Chongwenmenwai Subdistrict	崇文门外街道	Chóngwénménwài Jiēdào	48,817	1.12
Donghuashi Subdistrict	东花市街道	Dōnghuāshì Jiēdào	52,775	1.92
Longtan Subdistrict	龙潭街道	Lóngtán Jiēdào	56,257	3.06
Tiyuguanlu Subdistrict	体育馆路街道	Tǐyùguǎnlù Jiēdào	40,303	1.84
Tiantan Subdistrict	天坛街道	Tiāntán Jiēdào	50,304	4.03
Yongdingmenwai Subdistrict	永定门外街道	Yǒngdìngménwài Jiēdào	84,693	3.33

== Transport ==
=== Metro ===
Dongcheng is currently served by nine metro lines of the Beijing Subway:

- Line 1 - Tian'anmen East, Wangfujing 8 , Dongdan 5 , Jianguomen 2
- Line 2 - Qianmen 8 , Chongwenmen 5 , Beijing Railway Station, Jianguomen 1 , Chaoyangmen 6 , Dongsi Shitiao, Dongzhimen 13 Capital Airport , Yonghegong Lama Temple 5 , Andingmen, Guloudajie 8
- Line 5 - Hepingli Beijie, Yonghegong Lama Temple 2 , Beixinqiao Capital Airport , Zhangzizhonglu, Dongsi 6 , Dengshikou, Dongdan 1 , Chongwenmen 2 , Ciqikou 7 , Tiantandongmen
- Line 6 - Nanluoguxiang 8 , Dongsi 5 , Chaoyangmen 2
- Line 7 - Zhushikou 8 , Qiaowan, Ciqikou 5 , Guangqumennei, Guangqumenwai
- Line 8 - Andelibeijie, Guloudajie 2 , Shichahai, Nanluoguxiang 6 , Zhongguo Meishuguan (National Art Museum), Jinyu Hutong, Wangfujing 1 , Qianmen 2 , Zhushikou 7 , Tianqiao, Yongdingmenwai 14 , Muxiyuan
- Line 13 - Dongzhimen 2 Capital Airport
- Line 14 - Yongdingmenwai 8 , Jingtai
- Capital Airport Express - Dongzhimen 2 13 , Beixinqiao 5

== Education ==
=== Primary and secondary schools ===
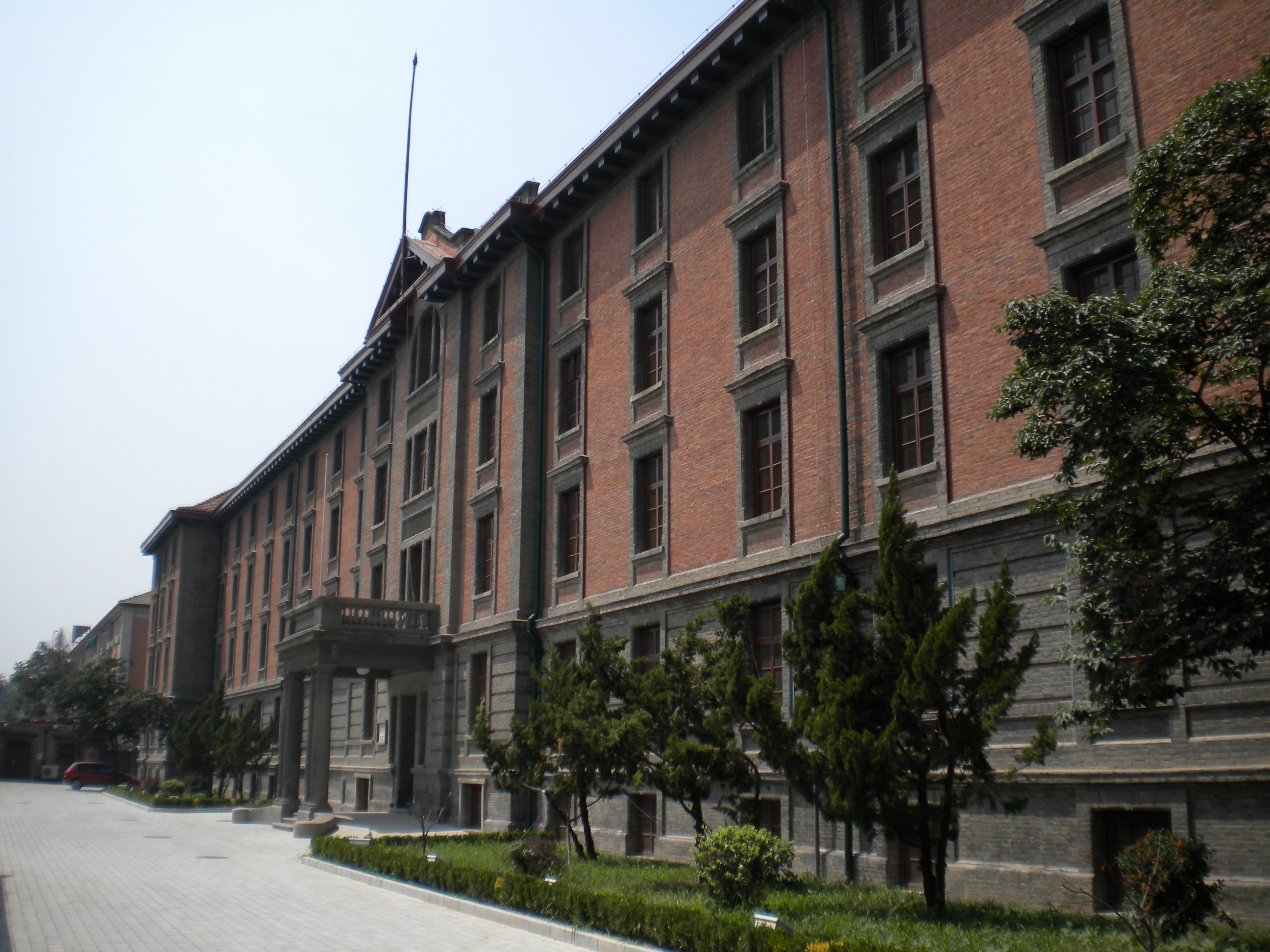
The Honglou (Chinese: 红楼; lit. 'Red (brick) building'), a former building of Peking University

Throughout Dongcheng are many of Beijing's public schools. Some of its high schools have been added to the city's list of beacon high schools, those that consistently maintain high standards. Among them are Beijing No. 166 High School on Tongfu Alley just off Dengshikou Street, Beijing Huiwen Middle School on Peixin Street in the former Chongwen District and Beijing No. 5 High School on Xiguan Hutong east of Nanluogoxiang. Another secondary institution of note, Beijing Jingshan School, is also located on Dengshikou Road. on Chaoyangmen Inner Street.

Beijing No. 25 Middle School has a dual Chinese-Canadian diploma program.

The Beijing Dongcheng Huimin Elementary School (北京市东城区回民小学) serves the local Hui population.

=== Post-secondary schools ===
From its founding in the early 20th century to the Japanese occupation of eastern China in 1937, Peking University was housed in the Belgian-designed brick Honglou (紅樓) or "Red House", at Wusi and Beiheyan streets. Mao Zedong worked in the library there, where he was among the leaders of the May Fourth Movement that lent its name to Wusi Street, an experience that later led him to help found the CCP. The university moved out to a larger campus in the Haidian District when Mao established the People's Republic of China in 1949, and the Honglou is now a museum.

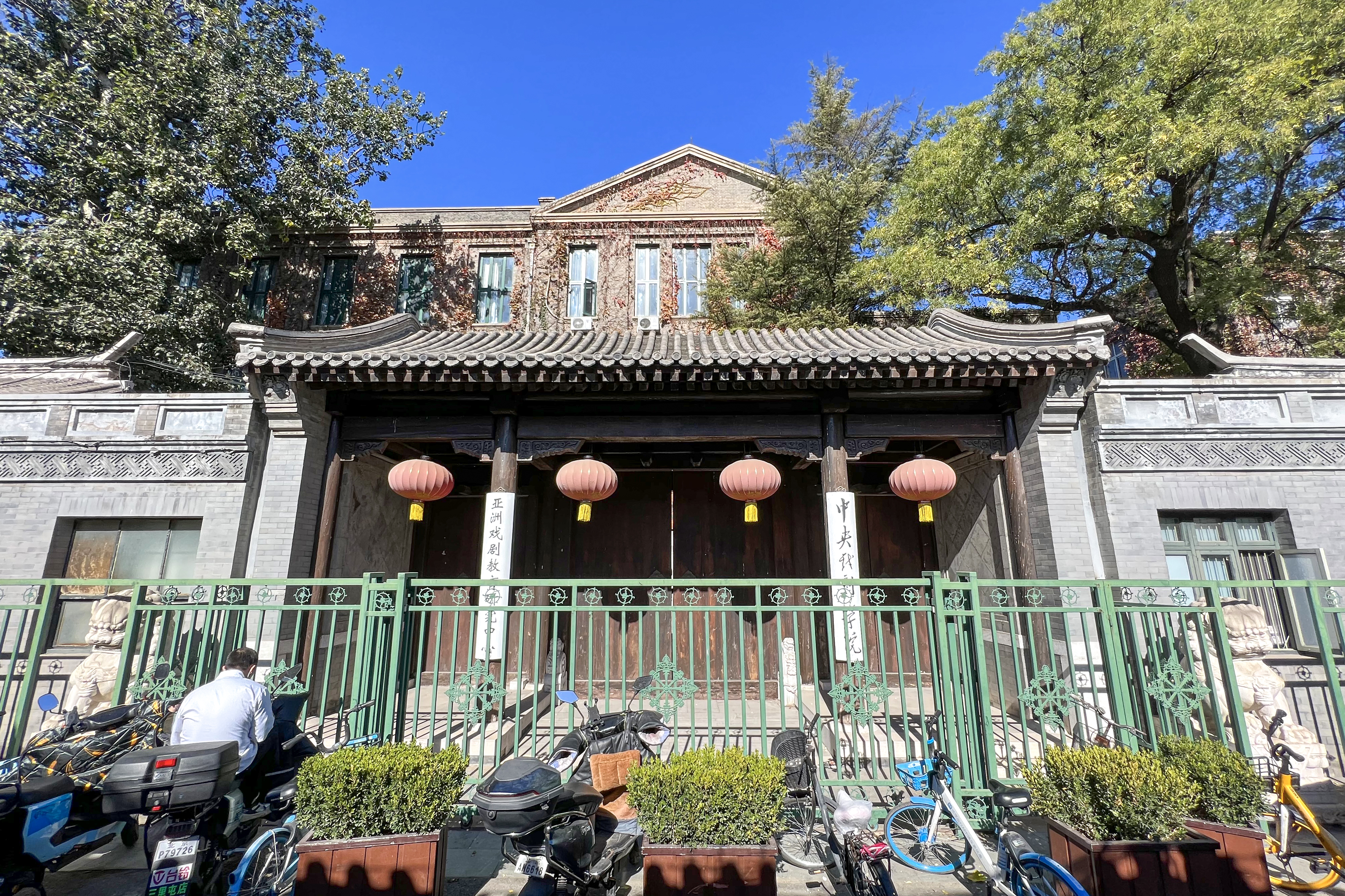
Central Academy of Drama

Shortly after the university moved, Mao established the Central Academy of Drama, the only institution of higher education currently in the district. Many accomplished Chinese actors have graduated from it, and it is considered one of the best drama schools in China, East Asia and Asia. It is located on Dongmianhua Hutong, a short distance west of Nanluoguxiang.

== Visitor attractions ==
Some of the well-known areas in Dongcheng District are:

- Forbidden City
- Zhongshan Park
- Tiananmen
- Tiananmen Square
- Mausoleum of Mao Zedong
- National Museum of China
- Legation Quarter
- Qianmen
- Wangfujing
- Yonghe Temple
- Temple of Confucius
- Guozijian (Imperial College)
- Temple of Earth
- St. Joseph's Catholic Church (Dong Tang)
- Drum Tower & Bell Tower
- Great Leap Brewing
- National Art Museum of China
- Zhihua Temple
- Youth Science & Technology Museum (Qingshaonian Kejiguan)
- Donghuamen Night Market
- Temple of Heaven
- Longtan Park
- Qingnianhu Park
- Huashi
- Chaonei No. 81

== Twin cities ==
- Province of Forlì-Cesena, Emilia-Romagna, Italy (2012)
