= Chongwenmenwai Subdistrict =

Chongwenmenwai Subdistrict 崇文门外街道
- Subdistrict
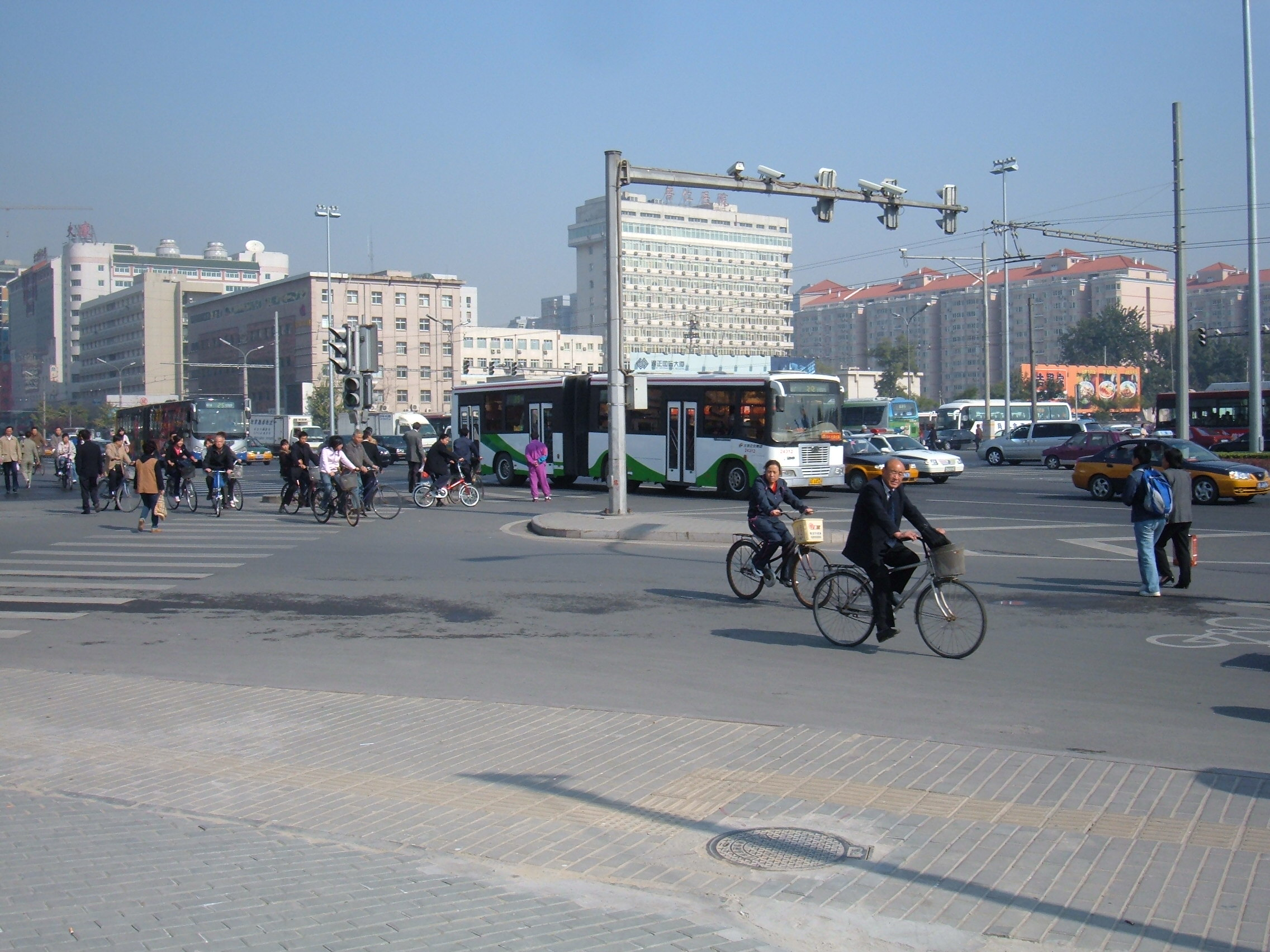
- Ciqikou, an intersection in Chongwenmenwai Subdistrict, 2007

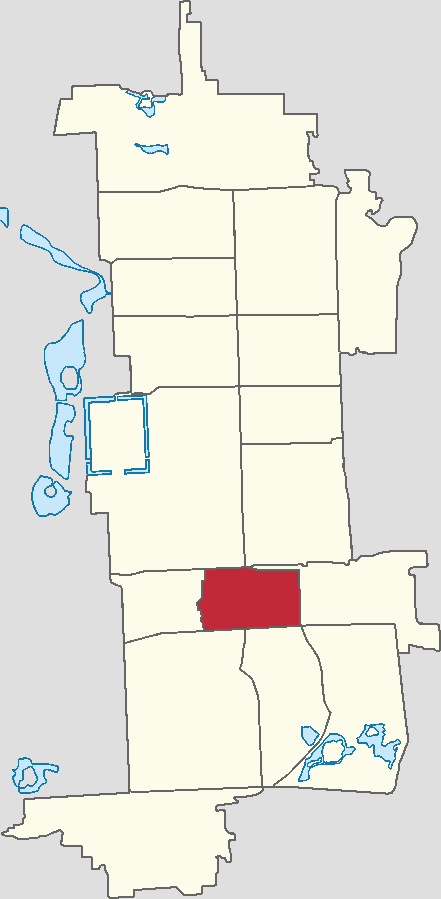
- Location of Chongwenmenwai Subdistrict within Dongcheng District

- Location within Beijing Location within China
- Coordinates: 39°53′36″N 116°25′15″E
- Country: China
- Municipality: Beijing
- District: Dongcheng

Area
  - Total: 1.12 km^{2} (0.43 sq mi)

Population (2020)
  - Total: 44,545
  - Density: 39,800/km^{2} (103,000/sq mi)
- Time zone: UTC+8 (China Standard)
- Postal code: 100062
- Area code: 010

Chongwenmenwai Subdistrict (Chinese: 崇文门外街道; pinyin: chóngwénménwài jiēdào) is a subdistrict located in the southern part of Dongcheng District, Beijing, China. As of 2020, It has a population of 44,545.

The subdistrict got its current name due to its location outside of Chongwenmen (Chinese: 崇文门; lit. 'Revere Culture Gate'), a gate of the former Beijing city wall.

== History ==
Timeline of changes in the status of Chongwenmenwai
Year	Status
1947	Part of 8th and 10th Districts
1954	Divided into four street offices: Shihunandayuan, Caochangbatiao, Jinmao and Xuejiawan
1958	Combined into the Dongxinglong Street Office, changed to Chongwenmenwai Subdistrict later the same year.
1966	Renamed Nanchanglu Subdistrict
1979	Restored as Chongwenmenwai Subdistrict

== Administrative Division ==
As of 2021, there are a total of 11communities in the subdistrict. They are as follows:

Administrative Division Code	Community Name in English	Community Name in Simplified Chinese
110101012001	Xinglong Dushi Xingyuan	兴隆都市馨园
110101012002	Xinshijie Jiayuan	新世界家园
110101012003	Chongwenmen Dongdajie	崇文门东大街
110101012004	Chongwenmen Xidajie	崇文门西大街
110101012005	Xihuashinanli Dongqu	西花市南里东区
110101012006	Xihuashinanli Xiqu	西花市南里西区
110101012008	Xinyi Jiayuan	新怡家园
110101012009	Xihuashinanli Nanqu	西花市南里南区
110101012010	Guoruicheng Xiqu	国瑞城西区
110101012011	Guoruicheng Zhongqu	国瑞城中区
110101012012	Guoruicheng Dongqu	国瑞城东区
