= Jingshan Subdistrict, Beijing =

Jingshan Subdistrict 景山街道
- Subdistrict
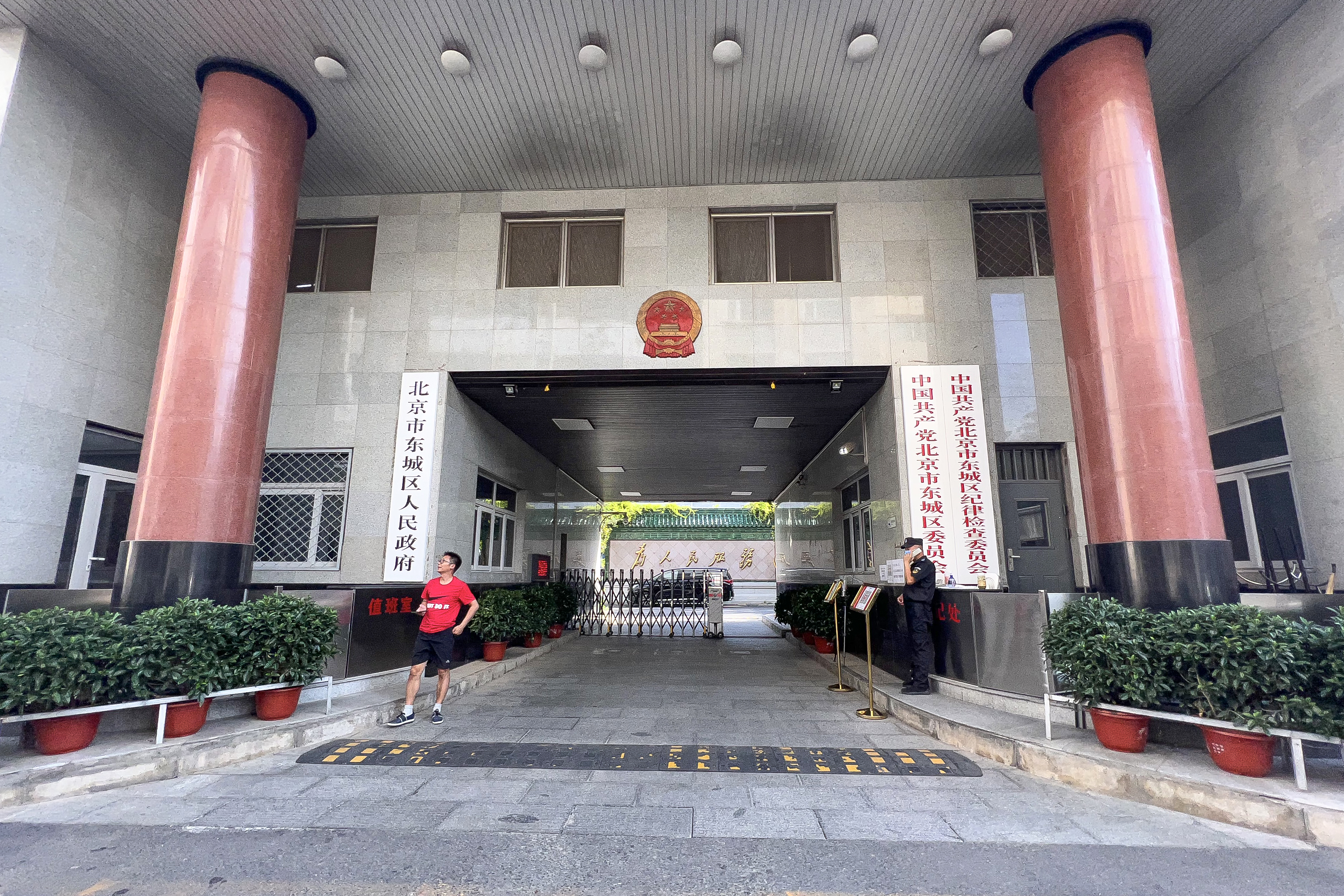
- The government building of the Dongcheng District

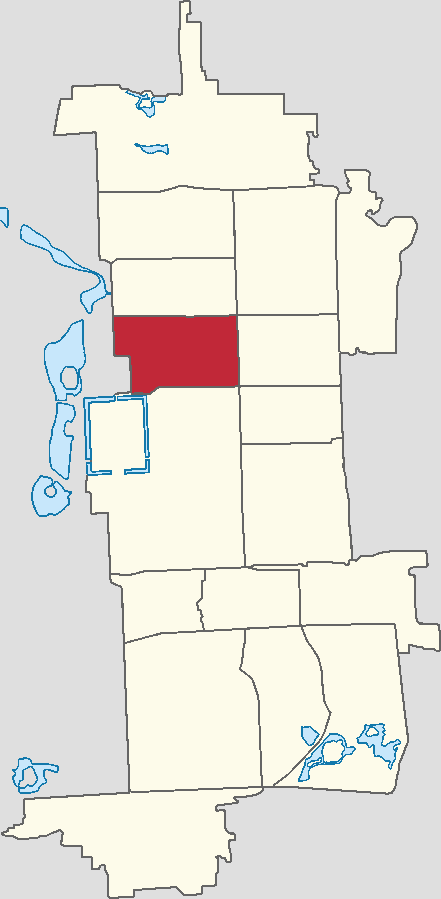
- Location of Jingshan Subdistrict within Dongcheng District

- Location within Beijing Location within China
- Coordinates: 39.9264°N 116.4116°E
- Country: China
- Municipality: Beijing
- District: Dongcheng
- Village-level Division: 8 communities

Area
  - Total: 1.45 km^{2} (0.56 sq mi)

Population (2020)
  - Total: 25,374
  - Density: 17,500/km^{2} (45,300/sq mi)
- Time zone: UTC+8 (China Standard)

Jingshan Subdistrict (Chinese: 景山街道; pinyin: jǐngshān jiēdào) is a subdistrict in Dongcheng District, Beijing, China. It contains 8 communities. The subdistrict has a total area of 1.64 square kilometers, and as of 2020, it has a population of 25,374.

The subdistrict received its current name from the Jingshan Park (Chinese: 景山公园; lit. 'Prospect Hill Park') that is located inside the subdistrict.

== History ==
Timeline of the status of Jingshan Subdistrict
Time	Status
1912	Part of 3rd and 6th Inner Districts
1949	Part of Dongcheng District. The following subdistricts were established: Madaren Hutong; Qianliang Hutong; Gongxian Hutong; Weijia Hutong; Jingshan Dongjie; Nafu Hutong
1955	Reorganized with only 4 subdistricts left: Nafu, Weishan, Jingshan and Mashi. The last one was merged into other districts at December of the same year.
1958	Nafu and Weishan were incorporated into Jingshan Subdistrict
1960	Reorganized into commune
1990	Changed back to a subdistrict

== Administrative Divisions ==
The table below lists the 8 communities under Jingshan as of 2021:

Administrative Division Code	Name in English	Name in Simplified Chinese
110101002001	Longfusi	隆福寺
110101002002	Jixiang	吉祥
110101002003	Huanghuamen	黄化门
110101002004	Zhonglou	钟鼓
110101002005	Weijia	魏家
110101002006	Wangzhima	汪芝麻
110101002008	Jingshan Dongjie	景山东街
110101002009	Huangchenggen Beijie	皇城根北街

== See also ==
- List of township-level divisions of Beijing
