= Longtan Subdistrict, Beijing =

Longtan Subdistrict 龙潭街道
- Subdistrict
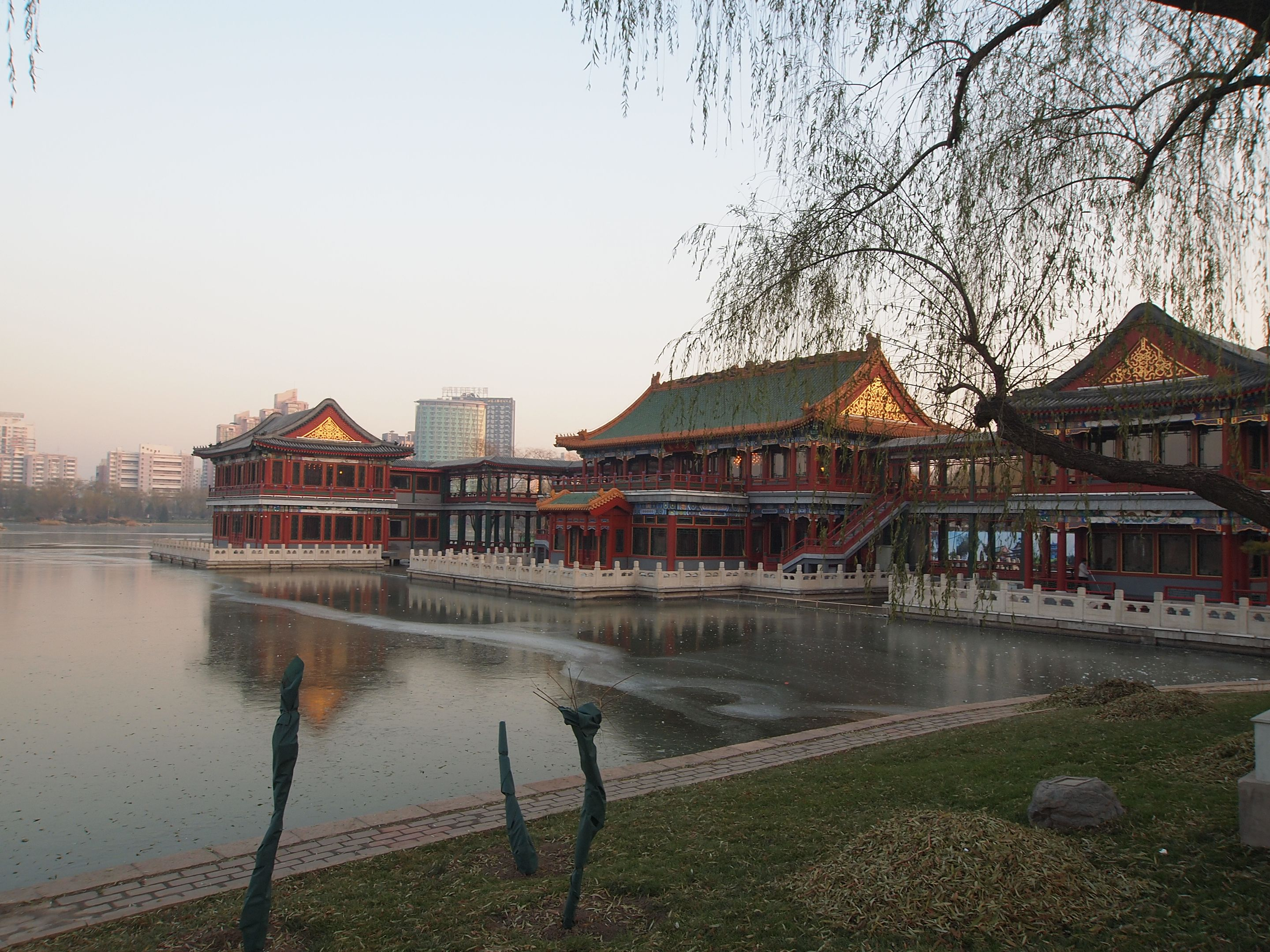
- The Longtan Park with the subdistrict, 2011

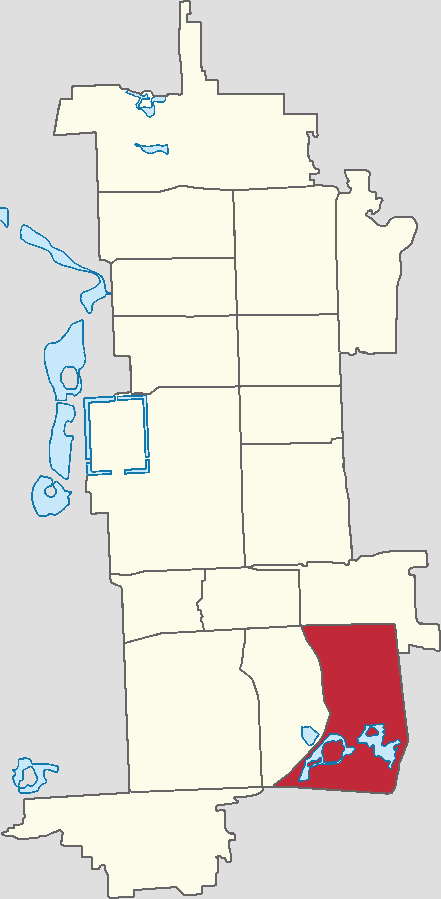
- Location of Longtan Subdistrict within Dongcheng District

- Location within Beijing Location within China
- Coordinates: 39°53′7″N 116°26′12″E
- Country: China
- Municipality: Beijing
- District: Dongcheng

Area
  - Total: 3.06 km^{2} (1.18 sq mi)

Population (2020)
  - Total: 53,930
  - Density: 17,600/km^{2} (45,600/sq mi)
- Time zone: UTC+8 (China Standard)
- Postal code: 100061
- Area code: 010

Longtan Subdistrict (Chinese: 龙潭街道; pinyin: lóngtán jiēdào) is a subdistrict on the southeast portion of Dongcheng, Beijing, China. In 2020, it has a population of 53,930.

The subdistrict was named after the Longtan Lake (Chinese: 龙潭湖; lit. 'Dragon Pit Lake') that is located within the subdistrict.

== History ==
Timeline of changes in the status of Longtan Subdistrict
Year	Status
1947	Part of the Tenth District
1954	Divided into two subdistricts: Banchang Xinli and Huoshengmiao
1958	The two combined to form the Longtan Subdistrict

== Administrative divisions ==
As of 2021, the Longtan Subdistrict was divided into 10 communities, all of which are listed in the table below:

Administrative Division Code	Community Name in English	Community Name in Simplified Chinese
110101014001	Anhualou	安化楼
110101014002	Xizhaosi	夕照寺
110101014006	Banchang Nanli	板厂南里
110101014010	Huacheng	华城
110101014012	Zuo'an Yiyuan	左安漪园
110101014013	Zuo'an Puyuan	左安浦园
110101014016	Xingfu	幸福
110101014017	Xinjiayuan	新家园
110101014018	Longtan Beili	龙潭北里
110101014019	Guangming	光明
