= Beijing No.166 High School =

Public secondary school in Dongcheng, Beijing, China

Coordinates: 39°55′9″N 116°24′33″E

Beijing No.166 High School (北京市第一六六中学) is a public secondary school Dongcheng, Beijing, China. The school is managed by the Beijing City Dongcheng District Education Committee.
