= Andingmen Subdistrict =

Andingmen Subdistrict 安定门街道
- Subdistrict
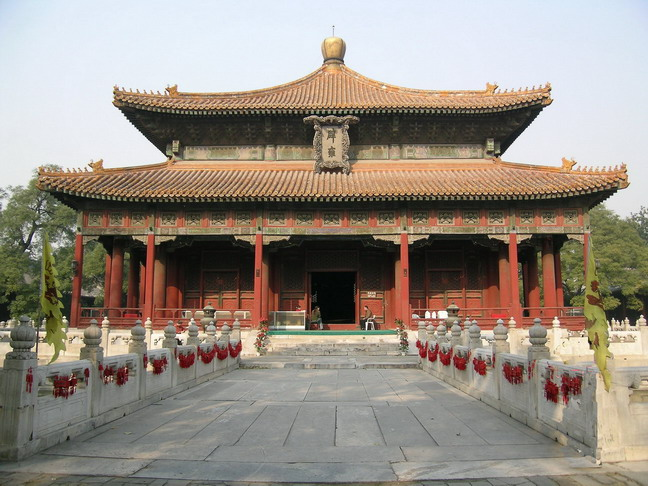
- The Imperial Academy within the subdistrict, 2004

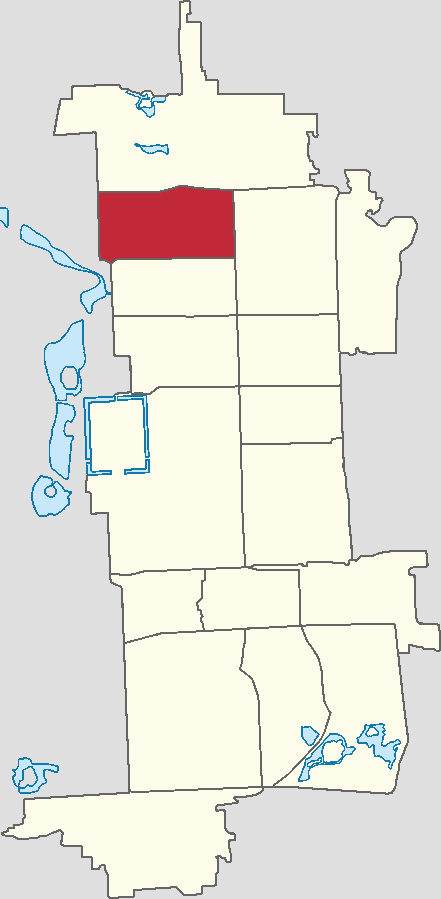
- Location of Andingmen Subdistrict within Dongcheng District

- Location within Beijing Location within China
- Coordinates: 39.9468°N 116.4070°E
- Country: China
- Municipality: Beijing
- District: Dongcheng
- Village-level Division: 9 communities

Area
  - Total: 1.74 km^{2} (0.67 sq mi)

Population (2020)
  - Total: 32,172
  - Density: 18,500/km^{2} (47,900/sq mi)
- Time zone: UTC+8 (China Standard)
- Postal code: 100007
- Area code: 010

Andingmen Subdistrict (Chinese: 安定门街道Chinese: 安定门街道; pinyin: āndìngmén jiēdào) is a subdistrict in the northwestern part of Dongcheng District, Beijing, China. It contains 9 communities, covers 1.74 square kilometers of land, and has a population of 32,172 by the year 2020.

This subdistrict was named after Andingmen (lit. 'Gate of Stability'), a gate of the Beijing city wall that once stood in this area.

== History ==
Timeline of changes in the status of Andingmen
Time	Status
1912	Part of the 3rd and 5th Inner Districts
1949	Part of Dongcheng District. The following subdistricts were established: Datoutiao; Fangjia Hutong; Cheniandian Hutong; Niangniangmiao; Liulisi; Zhaofujie; Xiaojingchang
1955	Merged into 5 subdistricts: Baochao, Cheniandian, Yongkang, Xiaojingchang and Toutiao. On December of the same year, the latter two were merged into others
1958	All the subdistricts were combined into Andingmen subdistrict
1960	transformed into a commune
1990	Restored as a subdistrict

== Administrative Division ==
As of 2021, there are 9 communities in Andingmen:

Administrative Division Code	Community Name in English	Community Name in Simplified Chinese
110101004001	Jiaobei Toutiao	交北头条
110101004002	Beiluoguxiang	北锣鼓巷
110101004003	Guozijian	国子监
110101004004	Zhonglouwan	钟楼湾
110101004005	Baochaonan	宝钞南
110101004006	Wudaoying	五道营
110101004009	Fensiting	分司厅
110101004011	Guowang	国旺
110101004012	Huayuan	花园

== Famous Sites ==
- Imperial Academy
- Drum Tower and Bell Tower
- Beijing Temple of Confucius

== See also ==
- List of township-level divisions of Beijing
