= Donghuamen Subdistrict =

Donghuamen Subdistrict 东华门街道
- Subdistrict
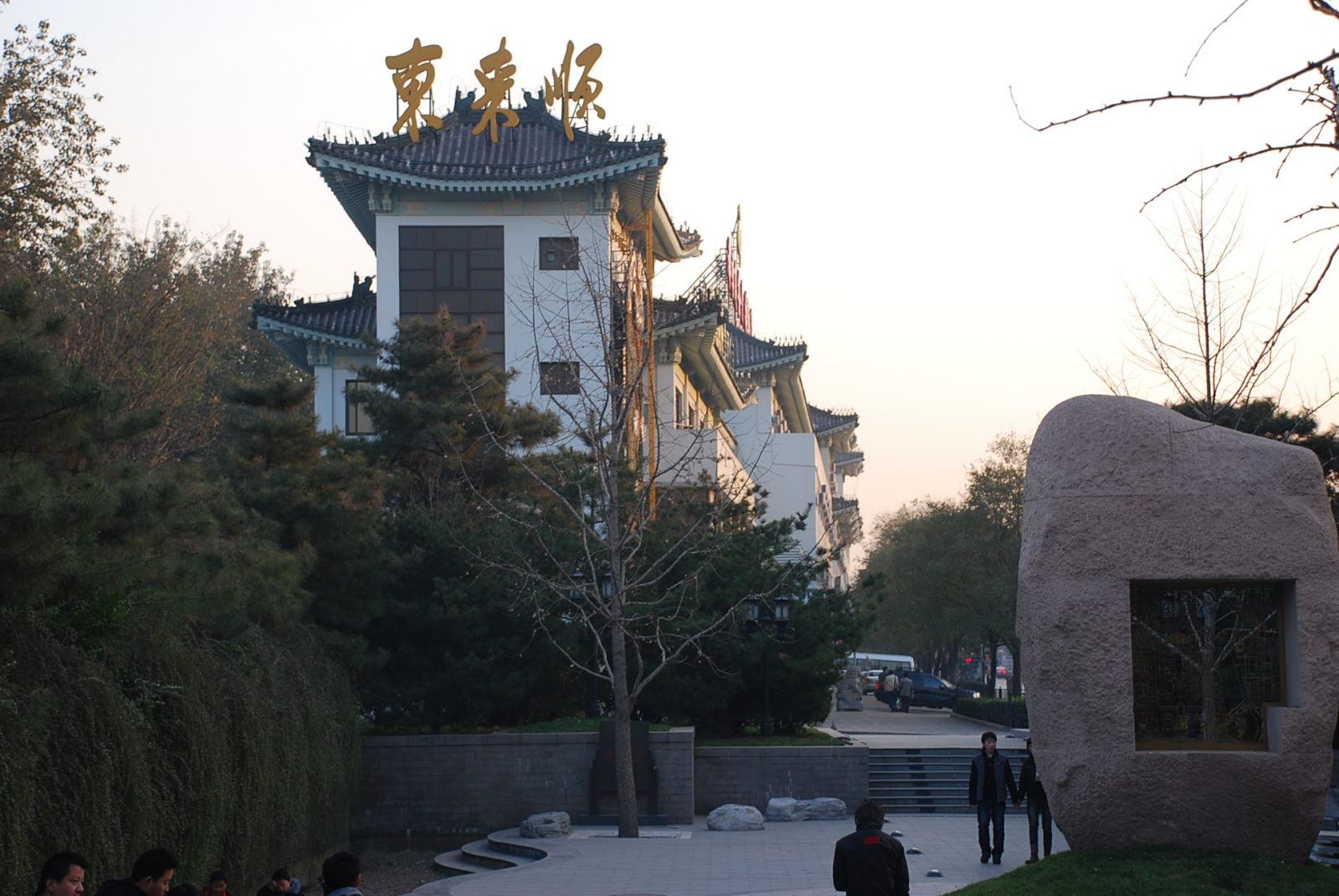
- Donghuamen Subdistrict, 2008

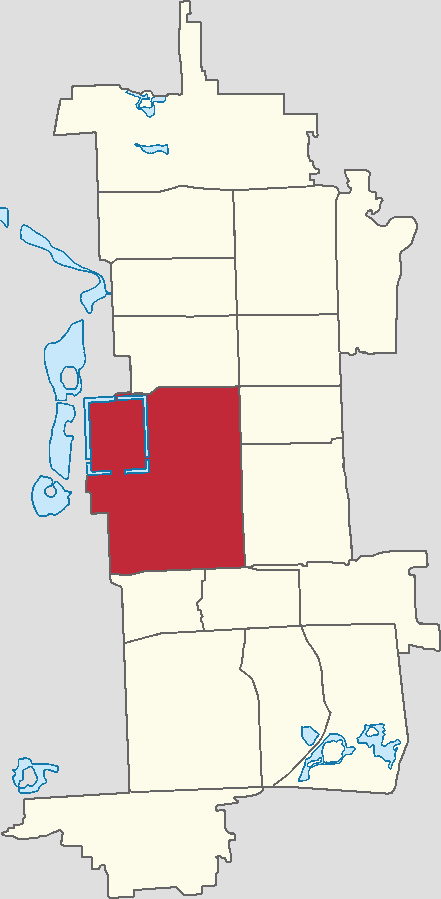
- Location of Donghuamen Subdistrict within Dongcheng District

- Location within Beijing Location within China
- Coordinates: 39.9128°N 116.4106°E
- Country: China
- Municipality: Beijing
- District: Dongcheng
- Village-level Division: 10 communities

Area
  - Total: 5.35 km^{2} (2.07 sq mi)

Population (2020)
  - Total: 38,090
  - Density: 7,120/km^{2} (18,400/sq mi)
- Time zone: UTC+8 (China Standard)
- Postal code: 100006
- Area code: 010

Donghuamen Subdistrict (Chinese: 东华门街道; pinyin: dōnghuámén jiēdào) is a subdistrict at the center of Dongcheng District, Beijing, China. Tiananmen Square is located within this subdistrict. As of 2020, it has a total population of 38,090.

The subdistrict was named after the Donghua Gate (Chinese: 东华门; pinyin: dōng huá mén; lit. 'East China Gate') located in the Eastern side of Forbidden City.

== History ==
Timeline of the status of Donghuamen
| Time | Status |
|---|---|
| 1912 | Part of 1st, 6th and 7th Inner Districts |
| 1949 | Incorporated into Dongcheng District. Divided into the following subdistricts: Datian Shuijing; Dongdan Santiao; Jinyu Hutong; Wangfujing Dajie; Guanfang Dayuan; Duofuxiang; Donghuamen Dajie; Pufusi |
| 1955 | Reorganized into 4 subdistricts: Baofang, Dacaochang, Pudusi and Xiaoweiying |
| 1958 | Merged to form Donghuamen Subdistrict |
| 1960 | organized into a people's commune |
| 1978 | Subdistrict status reinstated. |

== Administrative Division ==
In 2006, there were 14 communities under Donghuamen subdistrict. With redistricting over the years, as of 2021 there are currently 10 communities within the subdistrict:

| Administrative Division Code | Community Names (English) | Community Names (Simplified Chinese) |
|---|---|---|
| 110101001001 | Duofugang | 多福巷 |
| 110101001002 | Yinzha | 银闸 |
| 110101001005 | Dongchang | 东厂 |
| 110101001006 | Zhide | 智德 |
| 110101001007 | Nanchizi | 南池子 |
| 110101001009 | Dengshikou | 灯市口 |
| 110101001010 | Zhengyilu | 正义路 |
| 110101001013 | Taijichang | 台基厂 |
| 110101001014 | Shaojiu | 韶九 |
| 110101001015 | Wangfujing | 王府井 |

== Famous Sites ==
- Forbidden City
- Tiananmen Square
- Imperial Ancestral Temple
- Chairman Mao Memorial Hall
- Monument to the People's Heroes

== See also ==
- List of township-level divisions of Beijing
