= Tiyuguanlu Subdistrict =

Tiyuguanlu Subdistrict 体育馆路街道
- Subdistrict
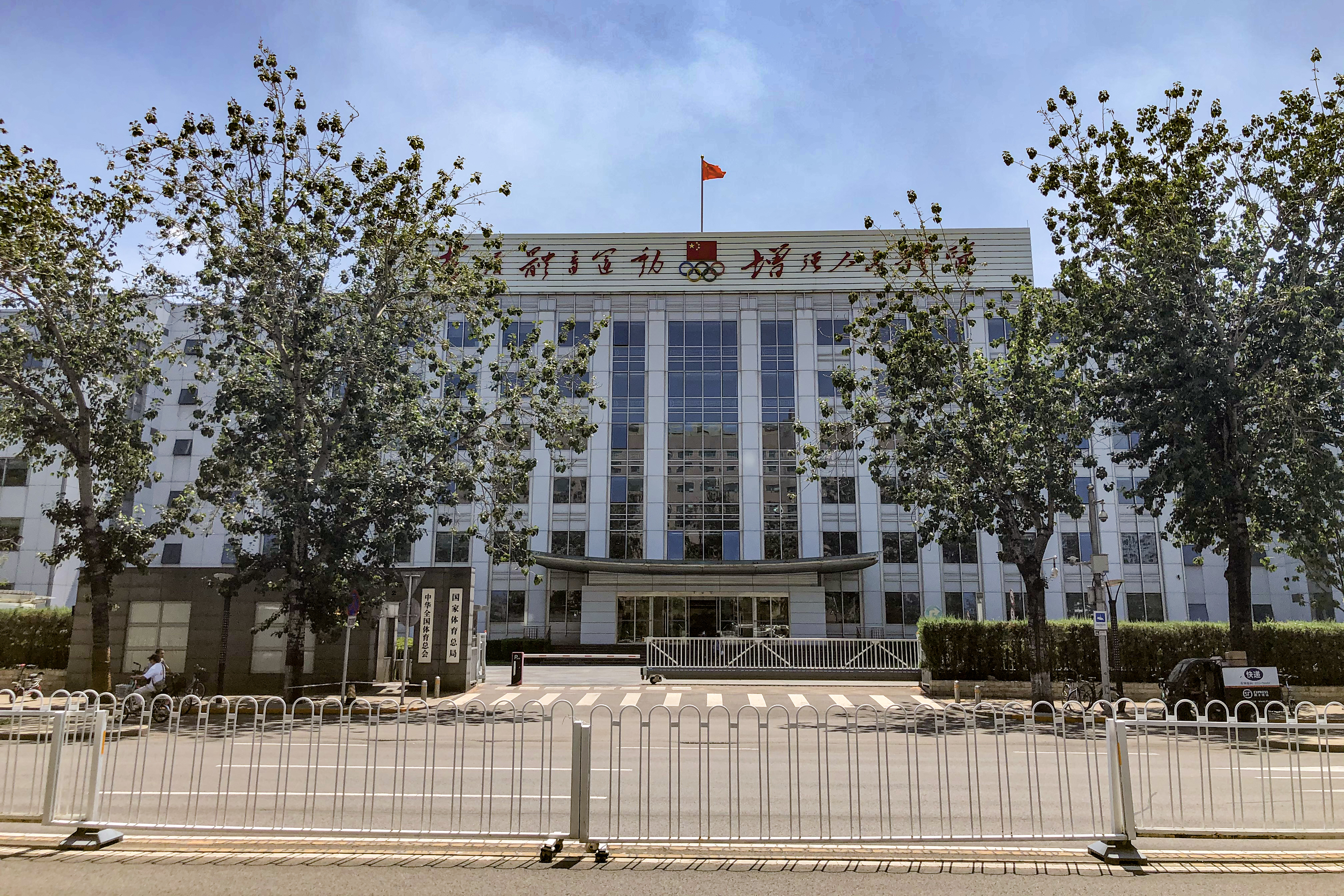
- Office Building of General Administration of Sport of China, located in this subdistrict, 2020

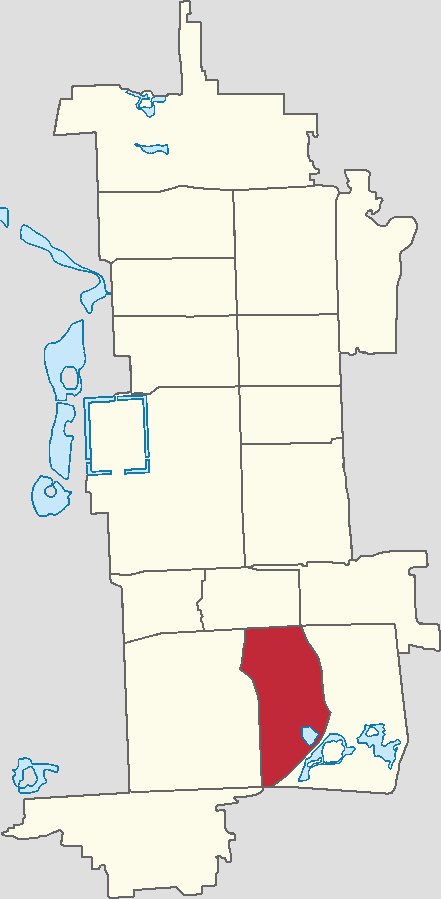
- Location of Tiyuguan Road Subdistrict within Dongcheng District

- Location within Beijing Location within China
- Coordinates: 39°53′8″N 116°25′19″E
- Country: China
- Municipality: Beijing
- District: Dongcheng

Area
  - Total: 1.84 km^{2} (0.71 sq mi)

Population (2020)
  - Total: 31,977
  - Density: 17,400/km^{2} (45,000/sq mi)
- Time zone: UTC+8 (China Standard)
- Postal code: 100061
- Area code: 010

Tiyuguanlu Subdistrict (Chinese: 体育馆路街道; pinyin: Tǐyùguǎnlù Jiēdào) is a southeastern subdistrict of the Dongcheng District, Beijing, China. In 2020 the population here is 31,977.

This subdistrict got its name from the Tiyuguan Road (Chinese: 体育馆路; lit. 'Gymnasium Road') within the subdistrict, which in turn was named after the Beijing Gymnasium.

== History ==
Timeline of changes in status of Tiyuguanlu Subdistrict
Year	Status
1954	Divided among the following subdistricts: Hongqiao, Yuqinguan, Guanwangmiao and Huoshenmiao (partial)
1955	Construction of Beijing Gymnasium and related offices were completed, Tiyuguanlu was created
1958	Surrounding area merged to form Tiyuguanlu Subdistrict

== Administrative Division ==
As of 2021, there are a total of 8 communities under the subdistrict. They are listed as follows:

Administrative Division Code	Community Name (English)	Community Name (Simplified Chinese)
110101015001	Dongting	东厅
110101015002	Congdian	葱店
110101015003	Fahua Nanli	法华南里
110101015004	Tiyu Zongju	体育总局
110101015005	Nangangzi	南岗子
110101015006	Changqingyuan	长青园
110101015007	Sikuaiyu	四块玉
110101015010	Xitang	西唐

== Landmark ==
- Beijing Gymnasium
