= Dongzhimen Subdistrict =

Dongzhimen Subdistrict 东直门街道
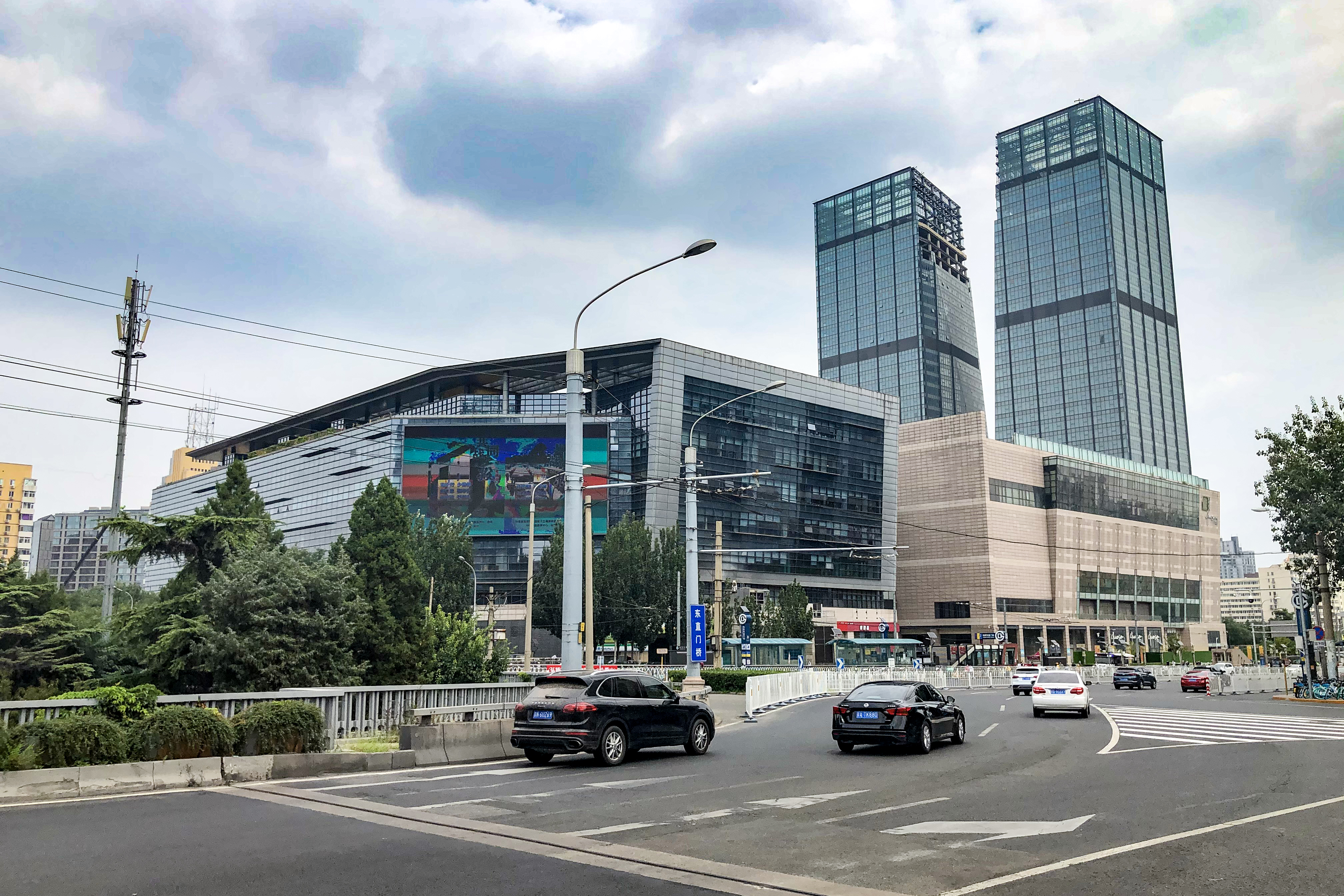
- Dongzhimen Public Transport Hub

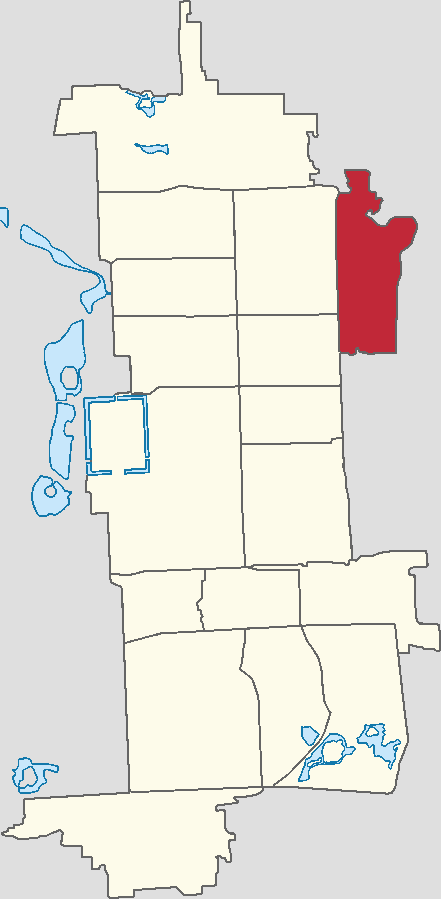
- Location of Dongzhimen Subdistrict within Dongcheng District

- Location within Beijing Location within China
- Coordinates: 39°55′58″N 116°26′3″E
- Country: China
- Municipality: Beijing
- District: Dongcheng

Area
  - Total: 2.07 km^{2} (0.80 sq mi)

Population (2020)
  - Total: 46,712
  - Density: 22,600/km^{2} (58,400/sq mi)
- Time zone: UTC+8 (China Standard)
- Postal code: 100027
- Area code: 010

Dongzhimen Subdistrict (Chinese: 东直门街道; pinyin: dōngzhímén jiēdào) is a district on the northeastern side of Dongcheng District, Beijing, China. As of 2020, the subdistrict's total population is 46,712.

The subdistrict got its current name from Dongzhimen (Chinese: 东直门; lit. 'East Straight Gate'), a gate of the Beijing city wall that used to exist in this area.

== History ==
Timeline of changes in the status of Dongzhimen Subdistrict
Year	Status
1912	Part of East Suburban District
1949	Part of Dongcheng District, two street offices were created: Dongzhimen and Xizhongjie
1950	Xizhongjie was incorporated into Dongzhimen
1955	Dongzhimen Street Office was changed to Dongzhimen Subdistrict
1960	Transformed into commune
1978	Changed back into a subdistrict

== Administrative Division ==
As of 2021, there are 10 communities within the subdistrict:

Administrative Division Code	Community Name in English	Community Name in Simplified Chinese
110101009003	Hujiayuan	胡家园
110101009004	Xinzhongjie	新中街
110101009005	Qingshuiyuan	清水苑
110101009006	Xinzhongxili	新中西里
110101009008	Shizipo	十字坡
110101009010	Dongwaidajie	东外大街
110101009012	Donghuan	东环
110101009013	Xiangheyuanbeili	香河园北里
110101009015	Gongrentiyuguan	工人体育馆
110101009016	Dongwaidajiebei	东外大街北

== Landmarks ==
- Workers Indoor Arena
