= Donghuashi Subdistrict =

Donghuashi Subdistrict 东花市街道
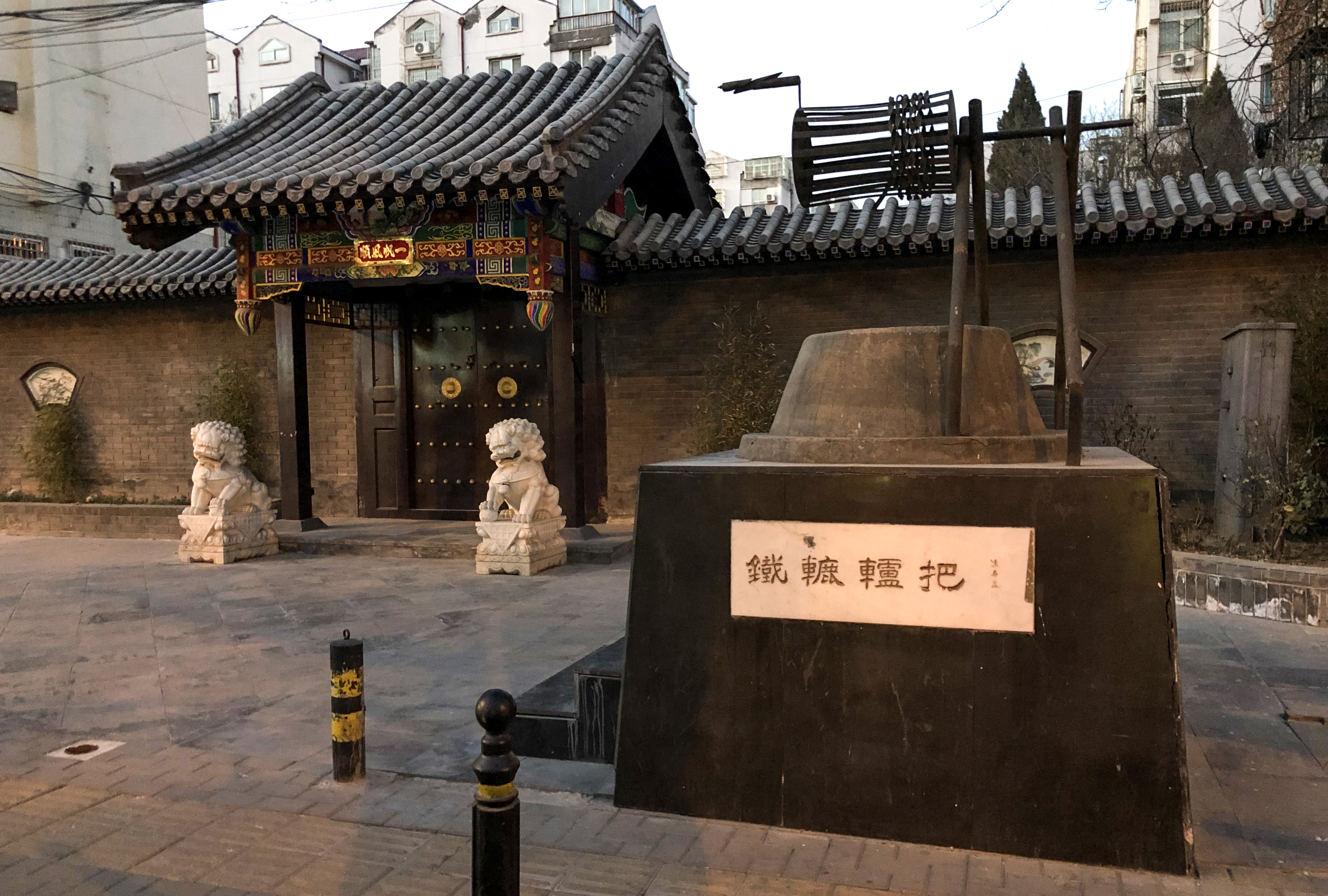
- Tielulubar Monument within Donghuashi Subdistrict, 2018

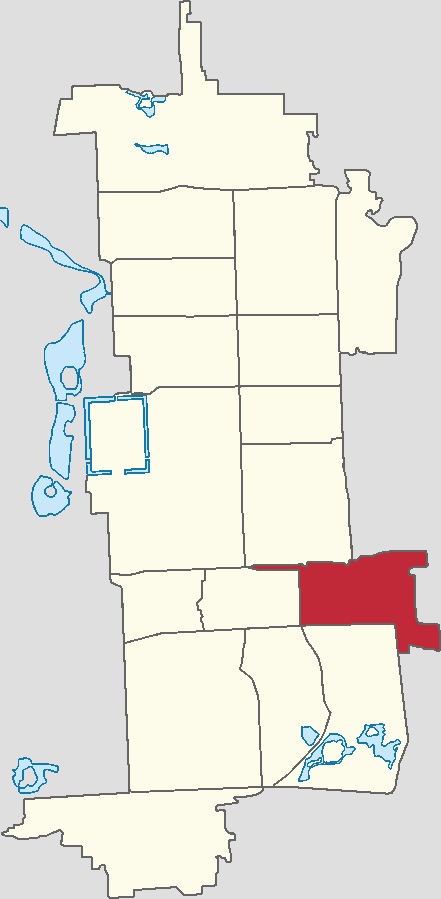
- Location of Donghuashi Subdistrict within Dongcheng District

- Location within Beijing Location within China
- Coordinates: 39°53′34″N 116°25′27″E
- Country: China
- Municipality: Beijing
- District: Dongcheng

Area
  - Total: 1.92 km^{2} (0.74 sq mi)

Population (2020)
  - Total: 47,864
  - Density: 24,900/km^{2} (64,600/sq mi)
- Time zone: UTC+8 (China Standard)
- Postal code: 100062
- Area code: 010

Donghuashi Subdistrict (Chinese: 东花市街道; pinyin: dōnghuāshì jiēdào) is a subdistrict in the southeast part of Dongcheng, Beijing, China. As of 2020, it has 47,864 residents within its borders.

The subdistrict got its name from Donghuashi Dajie (Chinese: 东花市大街; lit. 'East Flower Market Avenue') that is located with it.

== History ==
Timeline of changes in status of Donghuashi Subdistrict
| Year | Status |
|---|---|
| 1947 | Part of the 10th District |
| 1954 | Divided into 5 subdisitricts: Guanxiang, Baiqiao, Xiasitiao, Xihuashi and Shangtangzi |
| 1958 | Merged to form Donghuashi Subdistrict |

== Administrative Division ==
As of 2021, the Donghuashi Subdistrict has the following 8 communities under its administration:

| Administrative Division Code | Community Name in English | Community Name in Simplified Chinese |
|---|---|---|
| 110101013001 | Donghuashi Beili Xiqu | 东花市北里西区 |
| 110101013002 | Donghuashi Beili Dongqu | 东花市北里东区 |
| 110101013003 | Huashi Zaoyuan | 花市枣苑 |
| 110101013004 | Donghuashi Nanli | 东花市南里 |
| 110101013005 | Guangqumen Beili | 广渠门北里 |
| 110101013006 | Guangqumenwai Nanli | 广渠门外南里 |
| 110101013007 | Zhongshili | 忠实里 |
| 110101013008 | Donghuashi Nanli Dongqu | 东花市南里东区 |

== Landmarks ==
- Beijing Ming City Wall Ruins Park
