= Tiantan subdistrict, Beijing =

Tiantan Subdistrict 天坛街道
- Subdistrict
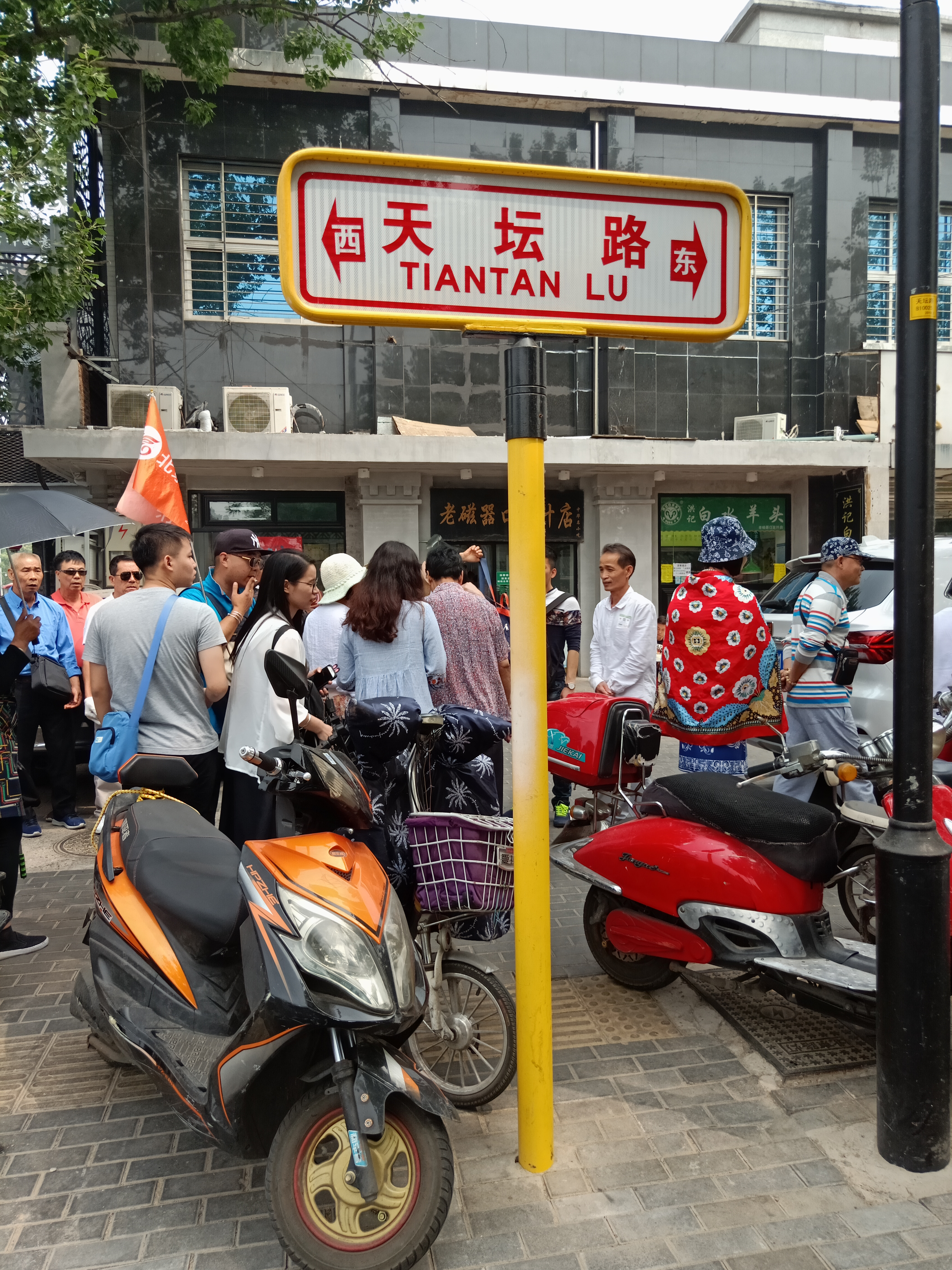
- Tiantan Road, a street within the subdistrict

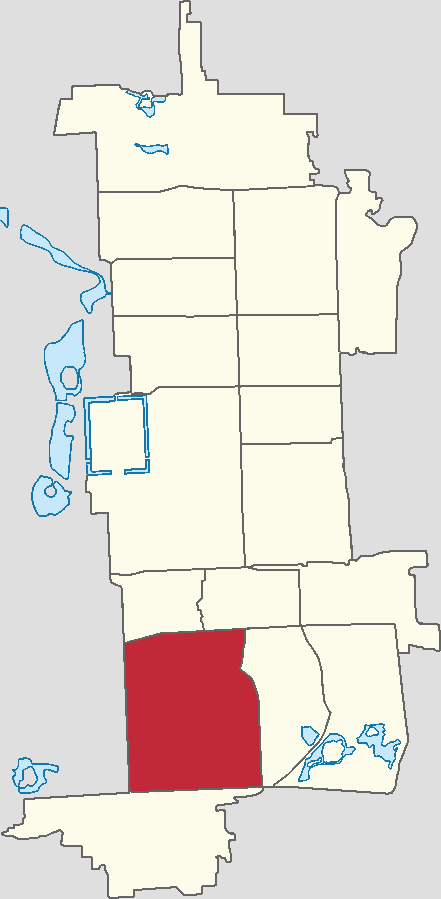
- Location of Tiantan Subdistrict within Dongcheng District

- Location within Beijing Location within China
- Coordinates: 39°52′54″N 116°24′23″E
- Country: China
- Municipality: Beijing
- District: Dongcheng

Area
  - Total: 4.03 km^{2} (1.56 sq mi)

Population (2020)
  - Total: 27,429
  - Density: 6,810/km^{2} (17,600/sq mi)
- Time zone: UTC+8 (China Standard)
- Postal code: 100050
- Area code: 010

Tiantan Subdistrict (Chinese: 天坛街道; pinyin: Tiāntán Jiēdào) is a subdistrict on the southwest side of the Dongcheng District, Beijing, China. As of 2020, it has a population of 27,429.

The subdistrict was named after Temple of Heaven, an imperial religious complex that is located in this area.

== History ==
Timeline of the changes in status of Tiantan Subdistrict
Year	Status
1947	Part of 12th District
1954	5 subdistricts were created: Lubanguan, Dashi Xindian, Jingzhongmiao, Tianqiaonan Dajie and Dongxiaoshi
1958	The subdistricts were merged to form Tiantan Subdistrict

== Administrative divisions ==
As of 2021, there are 11 communities within the Tiantan Subdistrict:

Administrative Division Code	Community Name in English	Community Name in Simplified Chinese
110101016001	Dongxiaoshi	东晓市
110101016002	Xiyuanzi	西园子
110101016008	Yongdingmennei	永定门内
110101016010	Taiyuan	泰元
110101016014	Jinyuchixi	金鱼池西
110101016015	Jinyuchi	金鱼池
110101016017	Qigu	祈谷
110101016018	Zhaoheng	昭亨
110101016019	Jintai	金台
110101016020	Guangli	广利
110101016021	Jingzhong	精忠

== Landmarks ==
- Temple of Heaven
- Beijing Museum of Natural History
