= Jiaodaokou Subdistrict =

Jiaodaokou Subdistrict 交道口街道
- Subdistrict
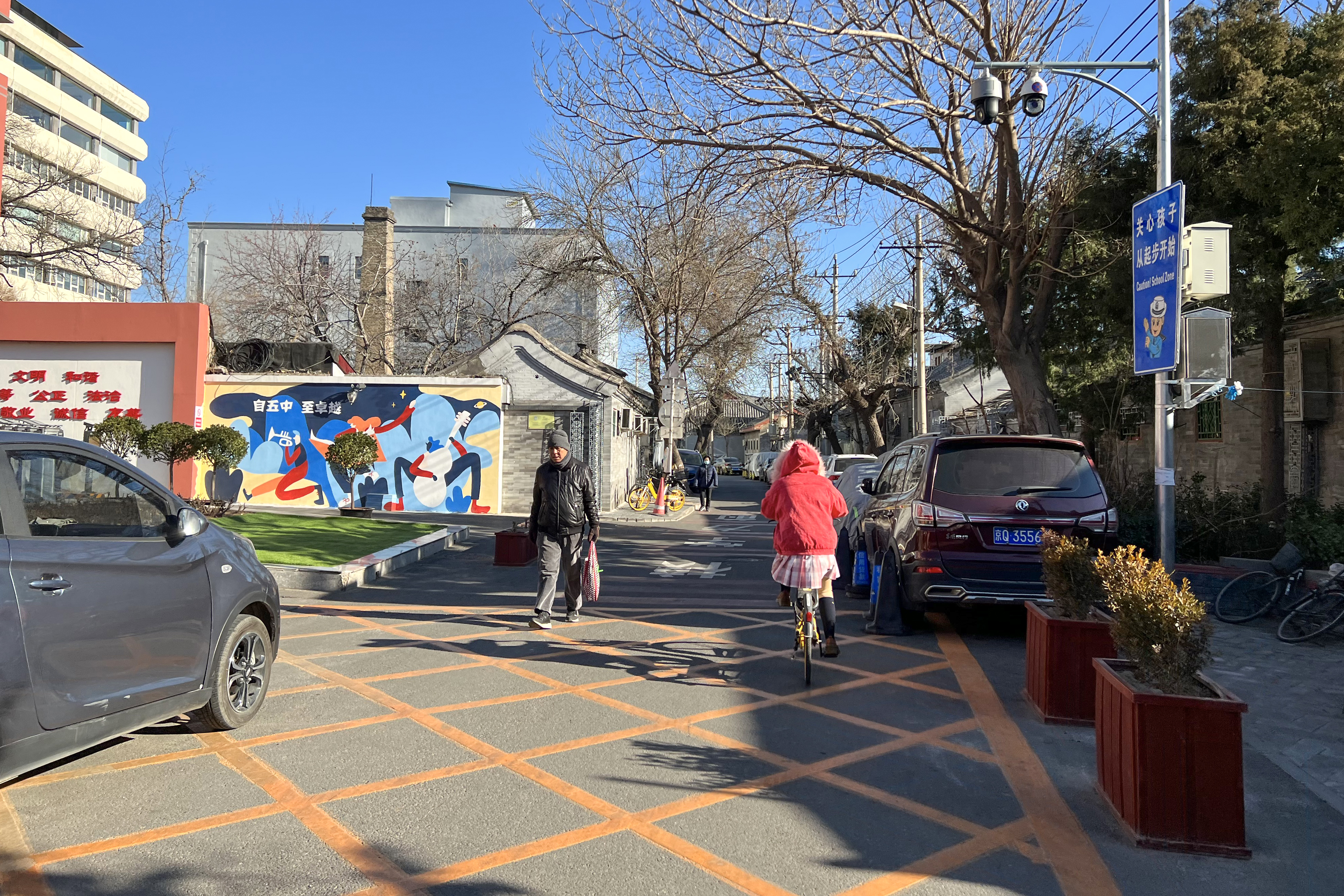
- Jiaodaokou District

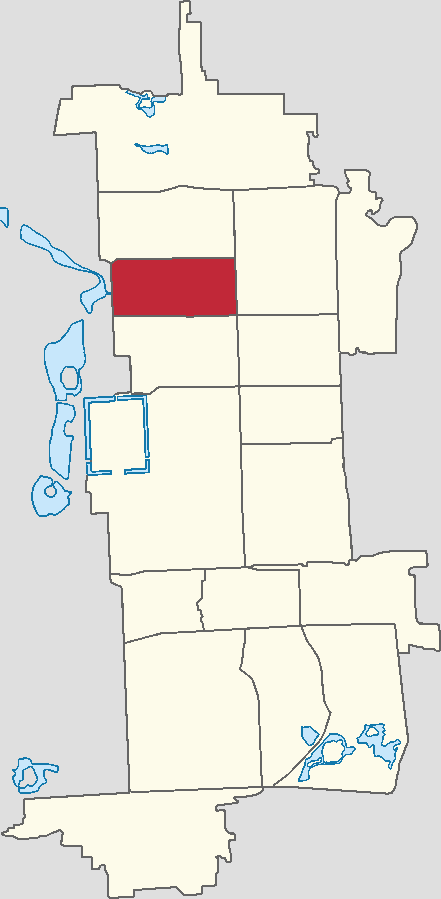
- Location of Jiaodaokou Subdistrict within Dongcheng District

- Location within Beijing Location within China
- Coordinates: 39°56′06″N 116°23′57″E
- Country: China
- Municipality: Beijing
- District: Dongcheng
- Village-level Division: 7 communities

Area
  - Total: 1.57 km^{2} (0.61 sq mi)

Population (2020)
  - Total: 31,951
  - Density: 20,400/km^{2} (52,700/sq mi)
- Time zone: UTC+8 (China Standard)
- Postal code: 100009
- Area code: 010

Jiaodaokou Subdistrict (Chinese: 交道口街道; pinyin: jiāodàokǒu jiēdào) is a subdistrict in Dongcheng District, Beijing, China. It contains 7 communities within 1.57 km^{2} of land, as of 2020 it has a permanent population of 31,951.

The subdistrict was named after the Jiaodaokounan (Chinese: 交道口南; lit. 'South of Intersection') Avenue that is located in it.

== History ==
Timeline of changes to the status of Jiaodaokou
Year	Status
1912	Part of 3rd and 5th Inner Districts
1949	Part of Dongcheng District. Following subdistricts were organized: Taotiao Hutong; Xiang'er Hutong; Ju'er Hutong; Doujiao Hutong; Yu'er Hutong
1955	The subdistricts were merged into Yu'er and Taotiao subdistricts
1958	The two were combined into the Jiaodaokou subdistrict
1960	Changed into a commune
1990	Reverted back to a subdistrict

== Administrative Divisions ==
As of 2021, there are seven communities within the subdistrict:

Administrative Disvision Code	Community Name in English	Community Name in Simplified Chinese	Population (2011)
110101003001	Jiaodong	交东	7,396
110101003002	Fuxiang	福祥	4,911
110101003003	Daxing	大兴	6,822
110101003005	Fuxue	府学	6,519
110101003007	Gulouyuan	鼓楼苑	9,479
110101003008	Ju'er	菊儿	6,096
110101003009	Nanluoguxiang	南锣鼓巷	8,491

== Famous Site ==
- Nanluogu Alley

== See also ==
- List of township-level divisions of Beijing
