= Rendinghu Park =

Park in Beijing, China

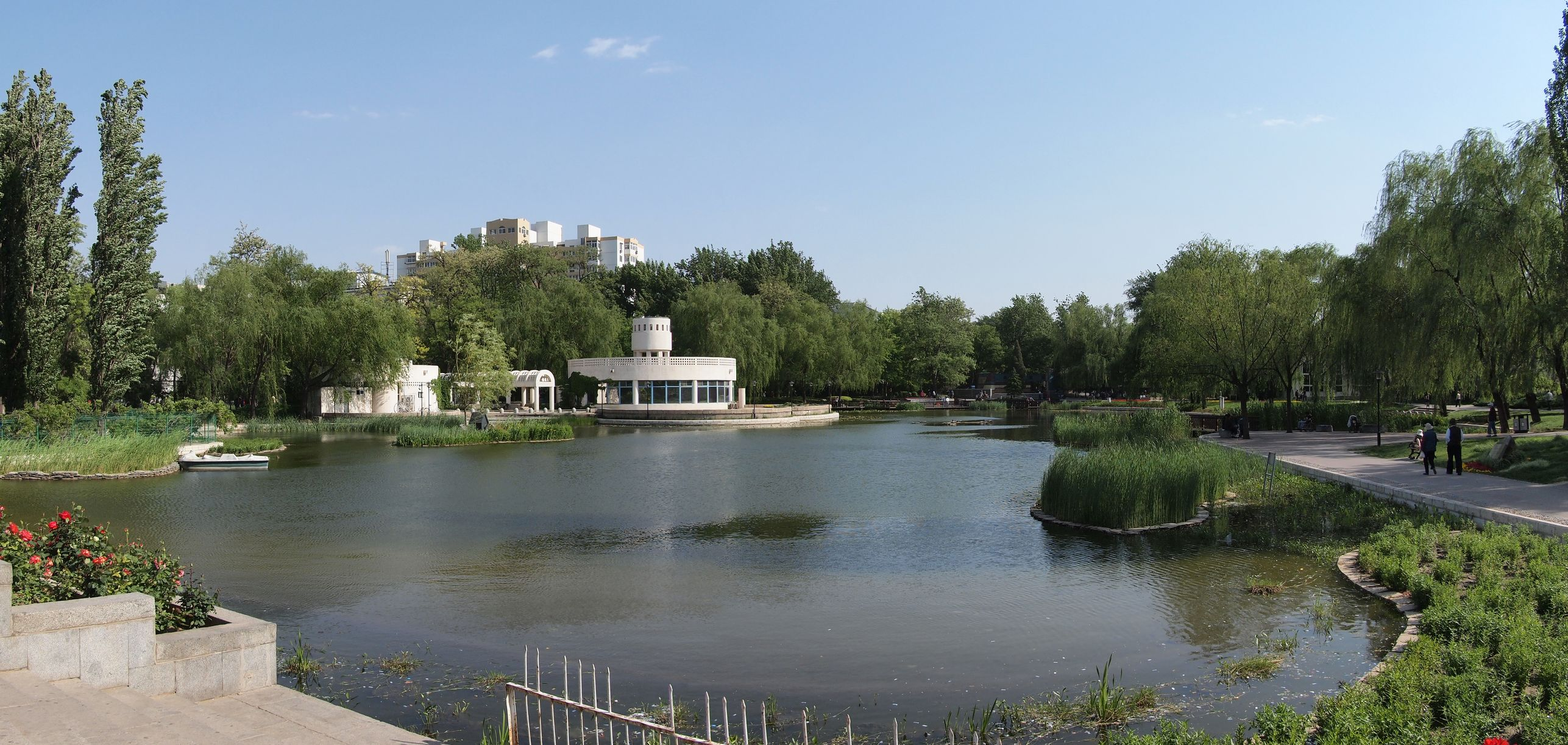
- Interactive map of Rendinghu Park
- Type: Urban park
- Location: Beijing, China
- Coordinates: 39°57′22″N 116°22′47″E
- Area: 9.2 hectares
- Created: 1958
- Status: Open all year

Rendinghu Park (simplified Chinese: 人定湖公园; traditional Chinese: 人定湖公園; pinyin: Réndìnghú Gōngyuán), is a European-style garden in Beijing, China, located at No. 25, Liupu Kang Street, Xicheng District, on the south side of Huangsi Street. The total area is 9.2 hectares, including 1 hectare of water area. Focusing on modern gardens, the southern half of the park uses grass, water features, sculptures, flower stands, and landscape walls to create a garden environment with the charm of European courtyards. In the northern half of the park, the sparse forests and grasslands, still water, decorative squares, and modern sculptures constitute a garden space full of the sense of the times in a simple way.

From 2006 to 2007, the Xicheng District Garden Bureau carried out a comprehensive renovation of the park, and in accordance with the goal of building an ecological and energy-saving garden, improved the park's body of water, built a simulated artificial wetland, planted a variety of aquatic plants, and used solar energy. The garden road was illuminated, the lake started being used for rainwater collection, and various service facilities were added, so that the park could provide greater ecological and social benefits.
