= Beijing Guozijian =

Historical National University in China

Coordinates: 39°56′44″N 116°24′25″E

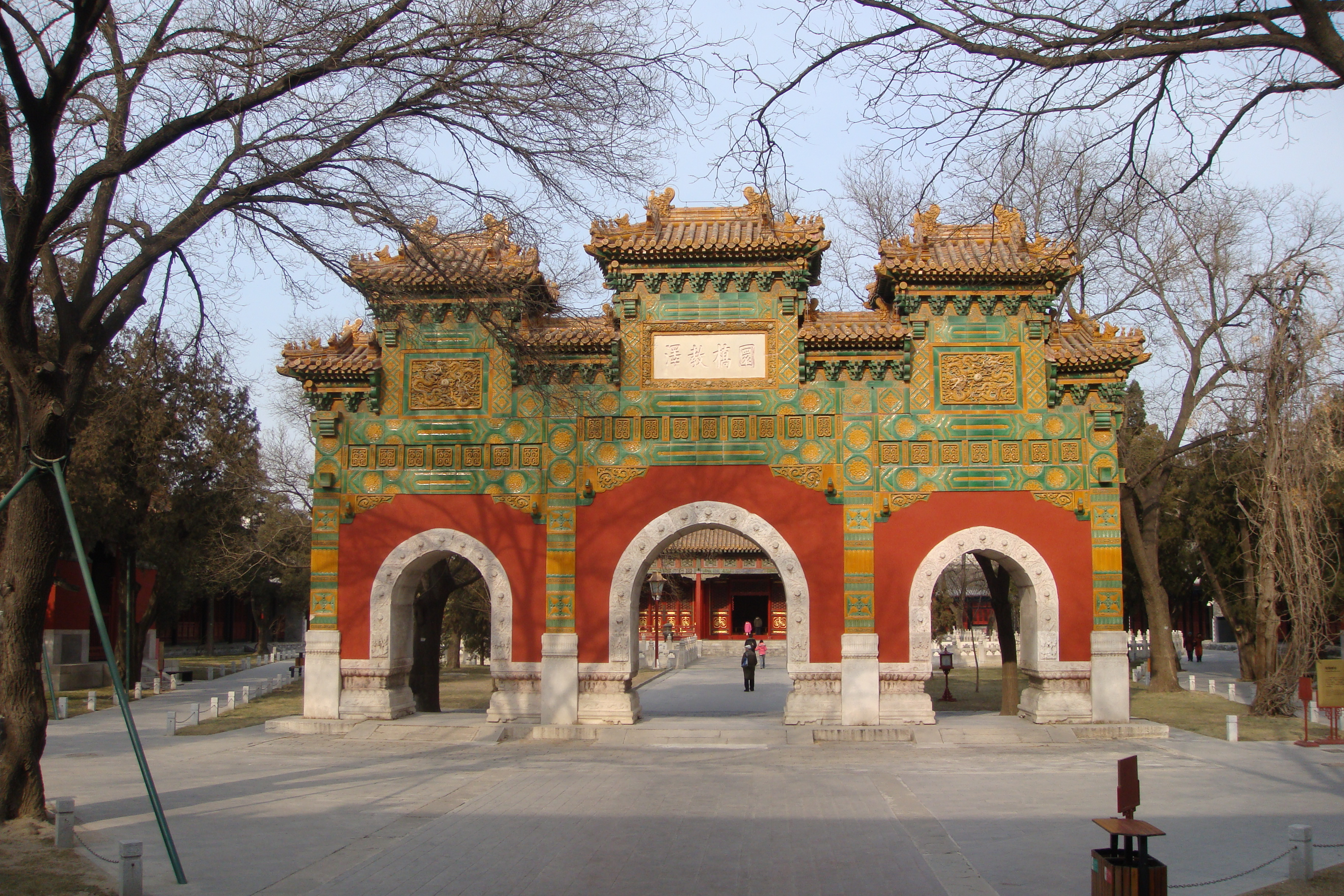
- The glazed paifang at the Beijing Guozijian entrance
- Traditional Chinese: 北京國子監
- Simplified Chinese: 北京国子监
Transcriptions
Standard Mandarin
- Hanyu Pinyin: Běijīng Guózǐjiān
- Wade–Giles: Pei-ching Kuo-tzu-chien

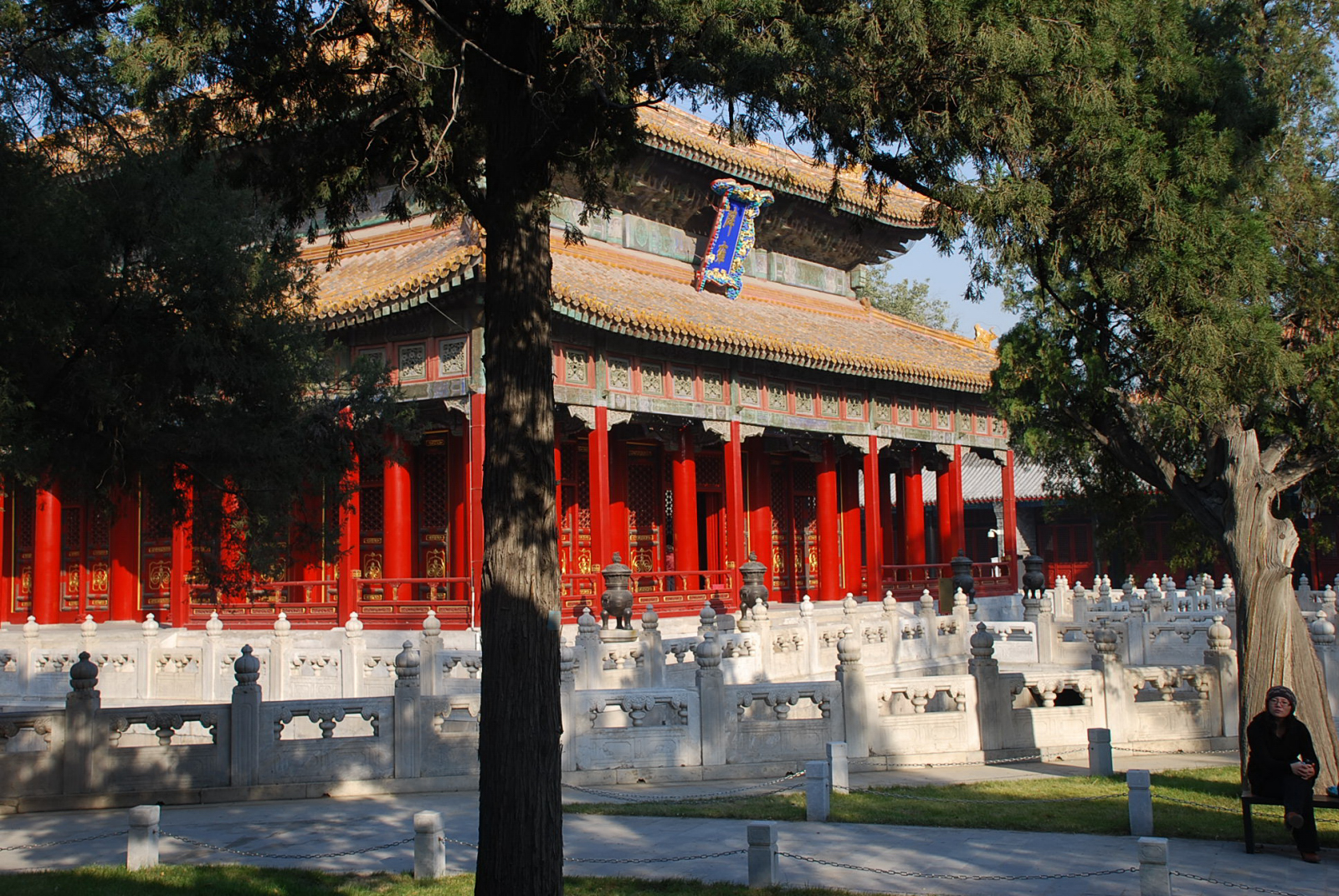
The Biyong Palace inside the Guozijian

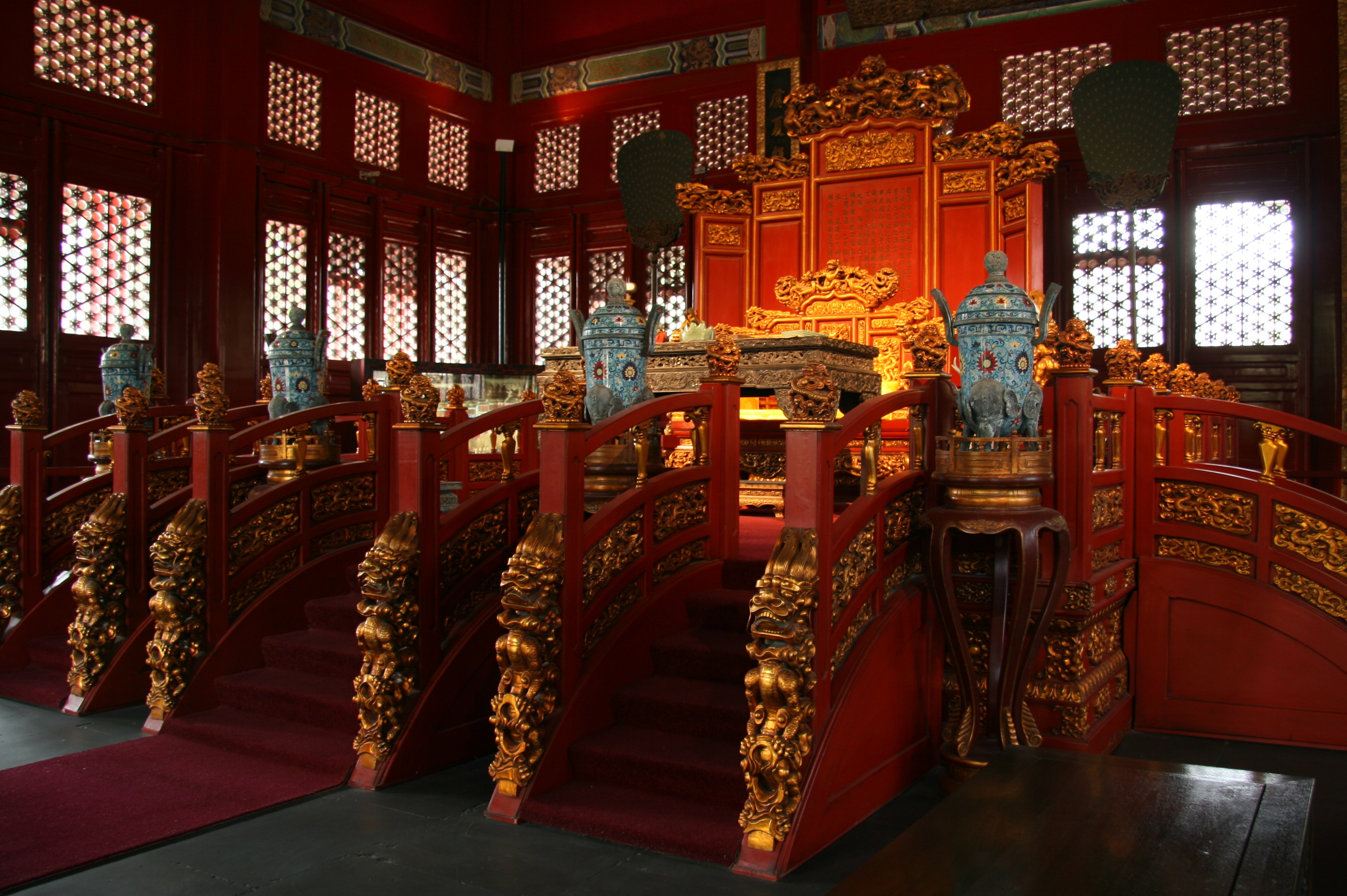
The Emperor's reading room with an imperial throne

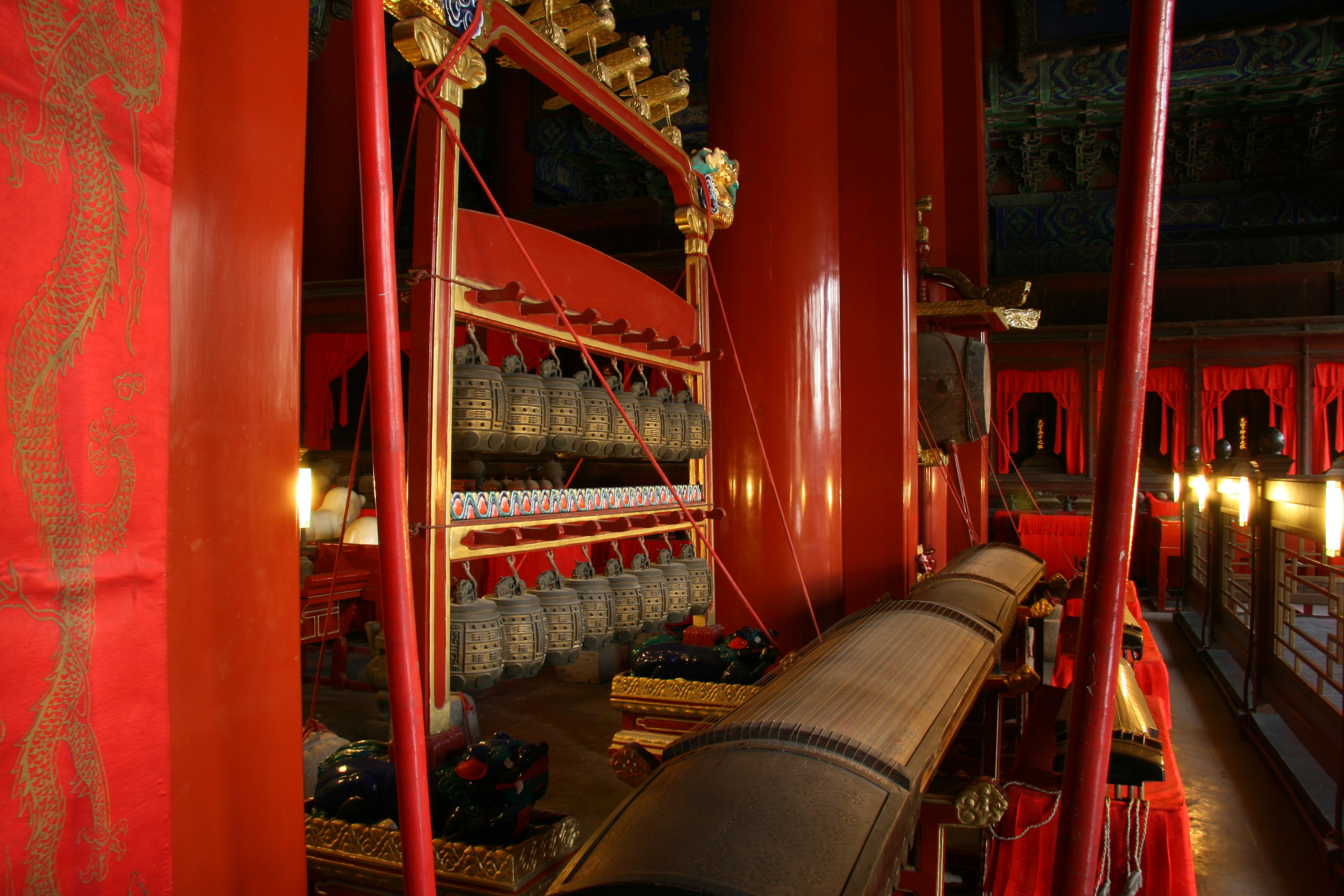
A room houses traditional Chinese instruments

The Beijing Guozijian, also known as the Imperial Academy or College, was China's national university during the late Yuan, late Ming, and Qing dynasties, and the last guozijian of China. Located beside the Beijing Confucian Temple on Guozijian Street in Andongmen Subdistrict, Dongcheng District, Beijing, China, the Guozijian was established under the Yuan but most of its present buildings date to the Ming dynasty. Like earlier guozijians, it was principally devoted to memorization and explication of the Confucian classics until the very end of the Qing when, during the Hundred Days' Reform, most of its educational and administrative functions were transferred to the Imperial University, now Peking University. The Beijing Guozijian was shut down in 1905 but, preserved as a museum, it remains an important historical and cultural site, protected at the national level.

== History ==
Various guozijians were the central institutes of learning of most dynasties of imperial China. First established under the Jin to educate the imperial princes, they were the highest institutes in China's traditional educational system, moved with the various capitals, and were eventually tasked with responsibilities such as providing model blockplates for use in prefectural and provincial schools to prepare for the imperial examinations. Emperors in imperial China would also visit the guozijians to read and expound on the Confucian classics to hundreds or thousands of students.

The Beijing Guozijian was first built in 1306 (Zhiyuan 24) during the Yuan Dynasty, and was reconstructed and renovated on a large scale during Yongle and Zhengtong reigns of the Ming Dynasty. Most of its present buildings date to this era, although they have been subsequently repaired and modified.

The administrative officials of Guozijian were called Chief (祭酒, Jìjiǔ), Dean of Studies (司業, Sīyè), or Proctor (監丞, Jiānchéng). The students who studied at the Guozijian were called "Jiansheng" (監生, Jiànshēng), and they mainly studied the Confucian classics.

== Location and layout ==
The Guozijian is situated at the central area of the Guozijian Street and adjoining several other well-known imperial structures of Beijing, and the complex of Guozijian accords with the Chinese tradition which dictates that the temple should be on the "left" and the school or college on the "right". To the east of the Guozijian, lies the Confucius Temple, the second largest Confucius temple in all of China, and the Yonghegong Temple, the largest Lama Temple in Beijing.

The whole complex of Guozijian faces south, and it has a total building area of more than 10,000 square metres (110,000 sq ft). Along the central axis of Guozijian are the Jixian Gate (the front gate), Taixue Gate (the second gate), the Glazed Archway, Biyong, Yiluntang, and Jingyiting (Jingyi Pavilion). On its east and west sides are the six halls and palaces in the traditional symmetrical layout.

== See also ==
- Guozijian
- Beijing Confucius Temple
- Peking University
- History of Beijing
- Sŏnggyun'gwan, Seoul, and Kukchagam, the Korean equivalent
- Imperial Academy, Hue, the Vietnamese equivalent
- National university
