= Capital Museum =

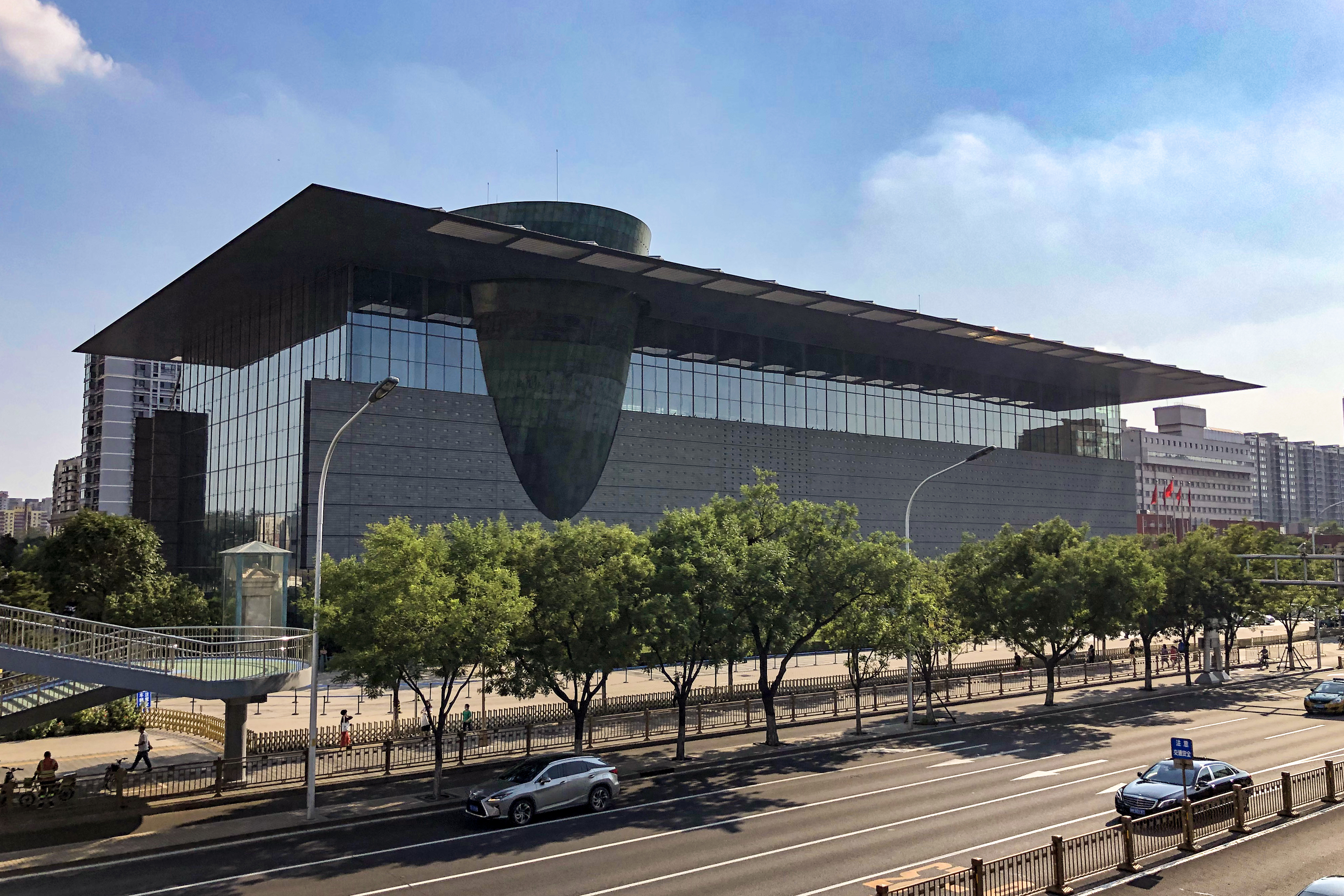
- Established: 1981
- Location: Xicheng District, Beijing
- Coordinates: 39.905°N 116.336°E
- Type: Art museum
- Visitors: 1,722,998 (2016)
- Public transit access: Muxidi station 1
- Website: www.capitalmuseum.org.cn

The Capital Museum (Chinese: 首都博物馆) is a public municipal art museum in Beijing, China. It opened in 1981 and moved into its present building in 2006, which houses a large collection of ancient porcelain, bronze, calligraphy, painting, jade, sculpture, and Buddhist statues from imperial China as well as other Asian cultures

Part of the museum's collections were formerly housed in the Confucius Temple on Guozijian Street in Beijing.

== Overview ==
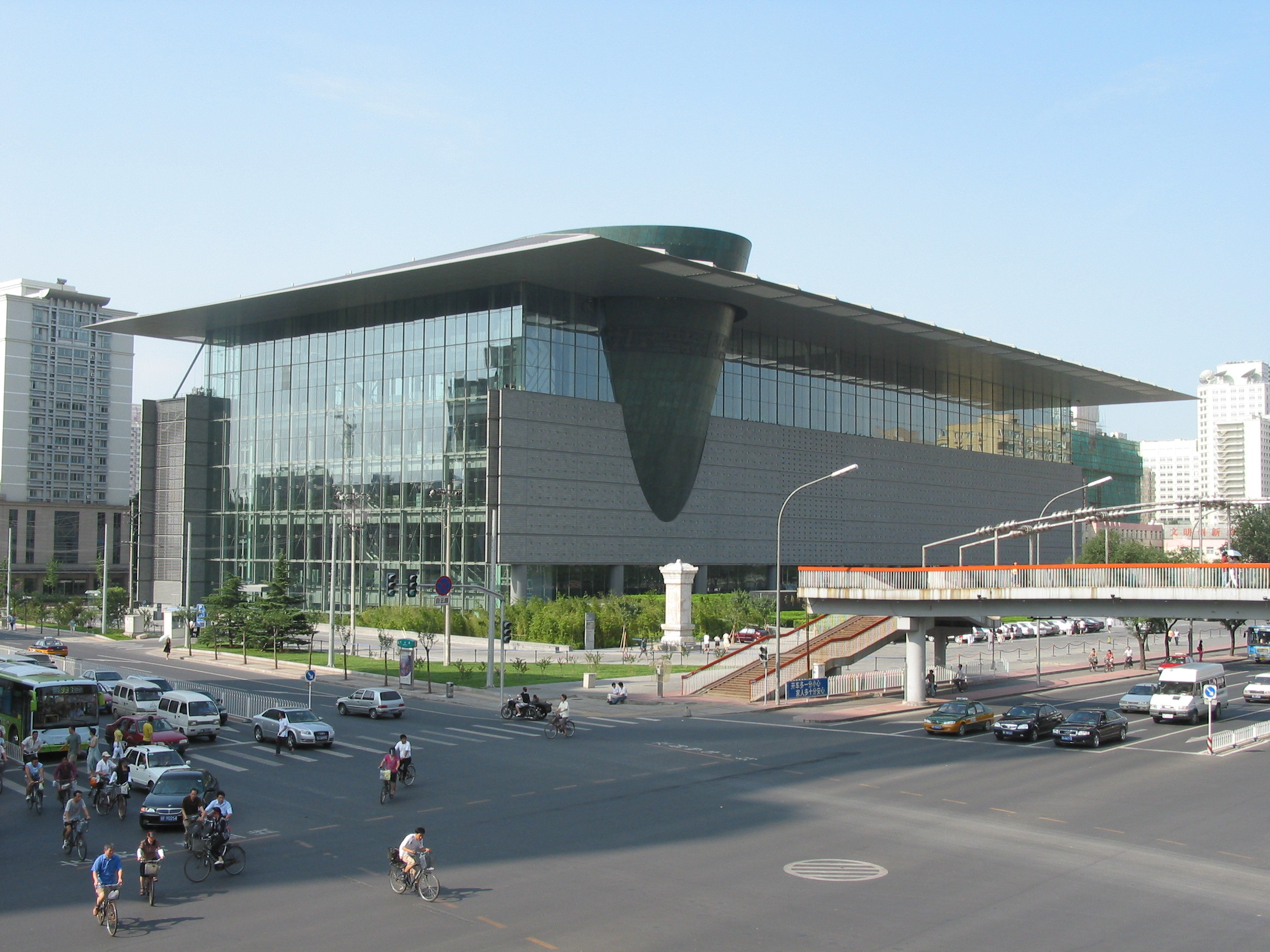
Exterior of the Capital Museum

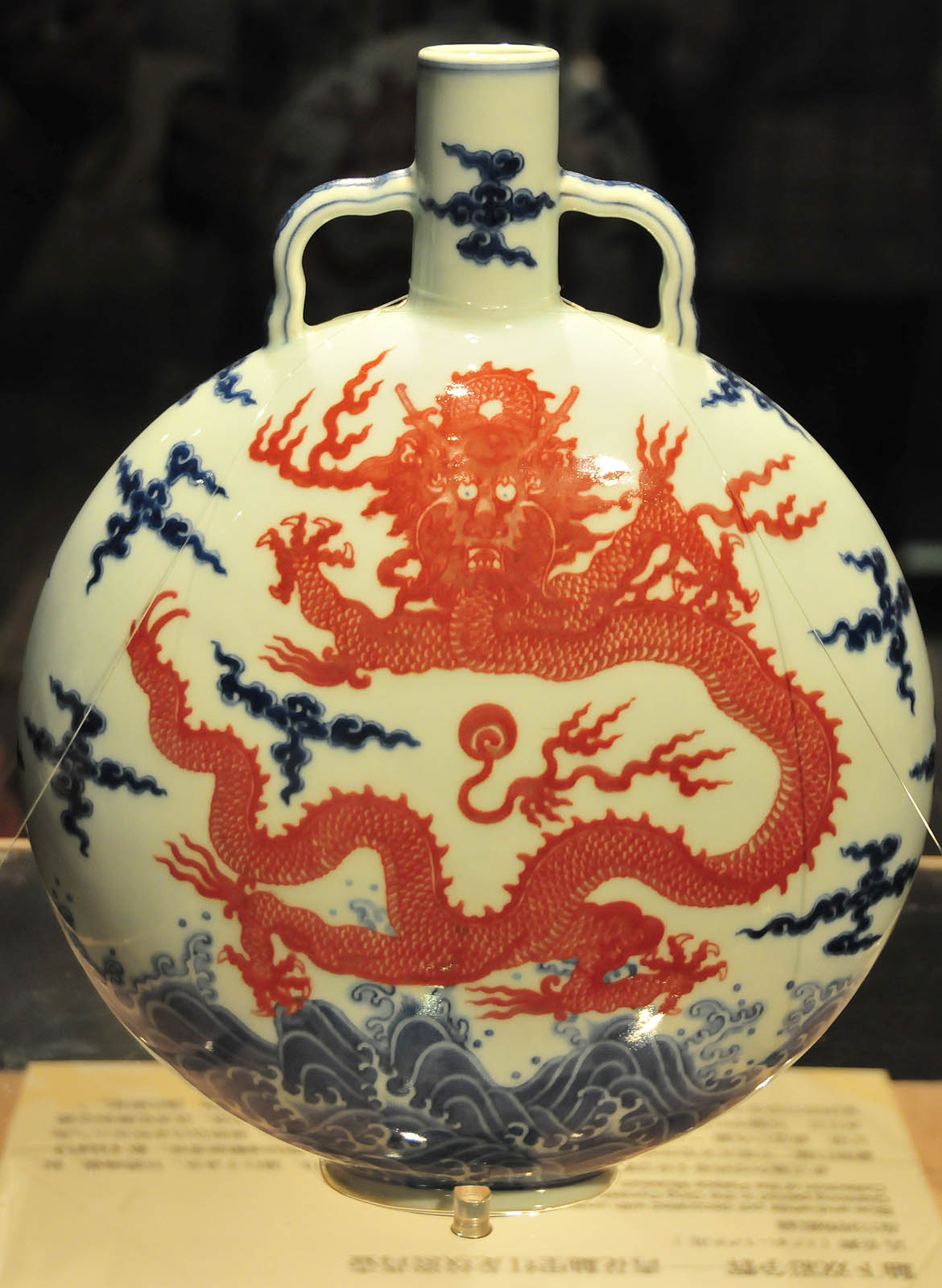
Blue and white porcelain vase from the Ming Dynasty.

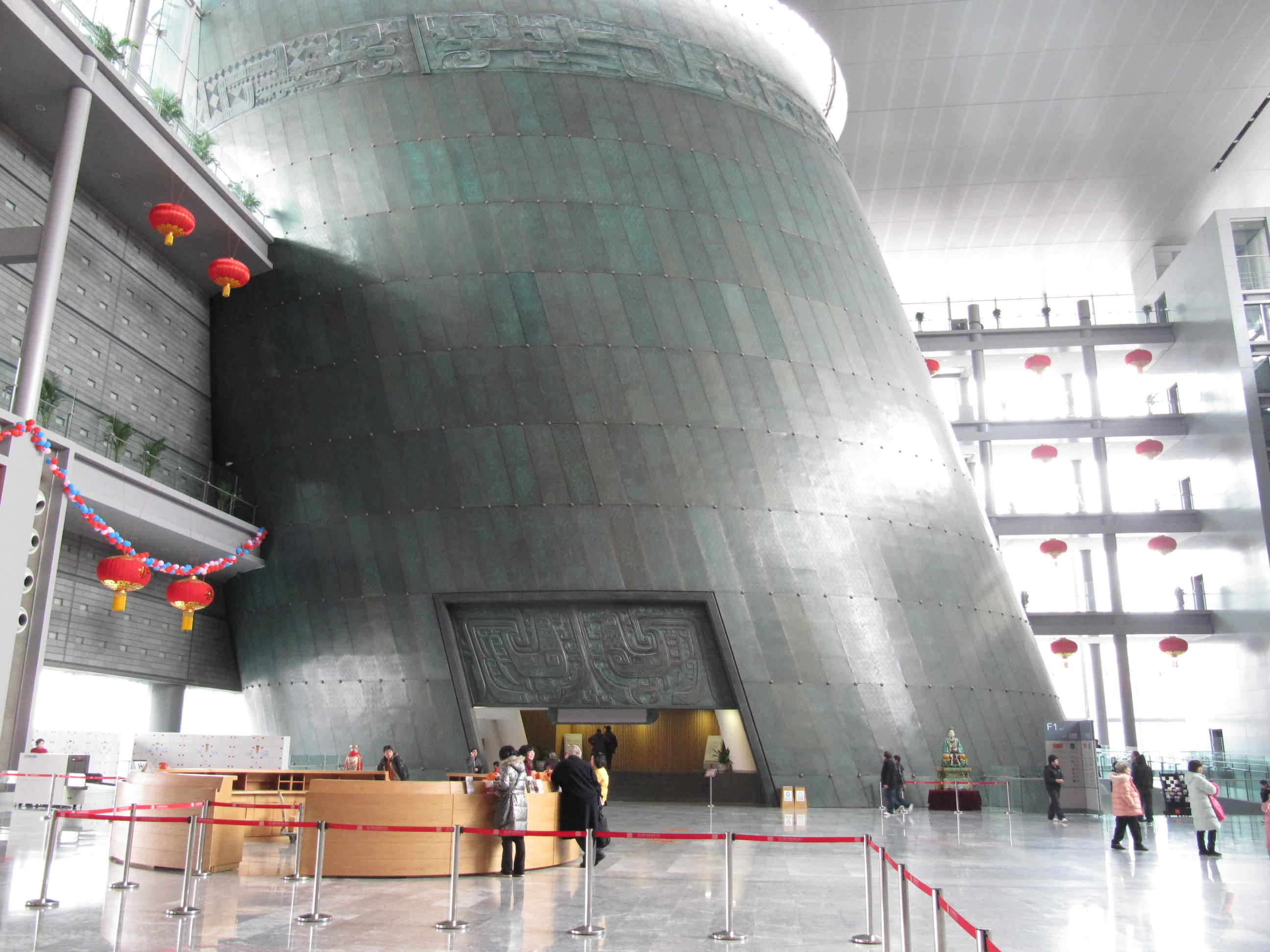
The Bronze Exhibition Hall

The Beijing Capital Museum today contains over 200,000 cultural relics in its collection. Only a small fraction of the collection is exhibited, and a significant percentage of the museum's art collection comprises artifacts unearthed in Beijing.

The Capital Museum was established in 1981 with a collection of some 83,000 objects. Although the museum pales in comparison to the visitors received in other major art museums in Beijing, such as the Palace Museum in the Forbidden City, the National Museum of China, and the National Art Museum of China, it has become one of the leading cultural institutions in the city.

The Capital Museum's massive roof and the gradient at the entrance square is the work of architects Jean-Marie Duthilleul and Cui Kai. It was influenced by ancient Chinese architecture, and the stone-made exterior wall was meant to symbolize the city walls and towers of ancient China. A piece of danbi (a massive stone carved with images of dragon, phoenix and imperial artifacts) is embedded on the ground in front of the north gate of the museum. A decorative archway from the Ming Dynasty, set in the reception hall, shows the "central axis" feature that is commonly seen in Chinese architecture. The Bronze Exhibition Hall, which has an oval-shape, was meant to symbolize the unearthing of ancient relics by its slanting design which extends from the ground to the exterior of the museum.

== See also ==
- List of museums in China
- List of largest art museums
