= Chengxian =

Chengxian may refer to:

- Cheng County, in Gansu, China
- Chengxian Street, or Guozijian Street, in Beijing, China
