= Guozijian Street =

Street in Beijing, China

Coordinates: 39.9455°N 116.4123°E

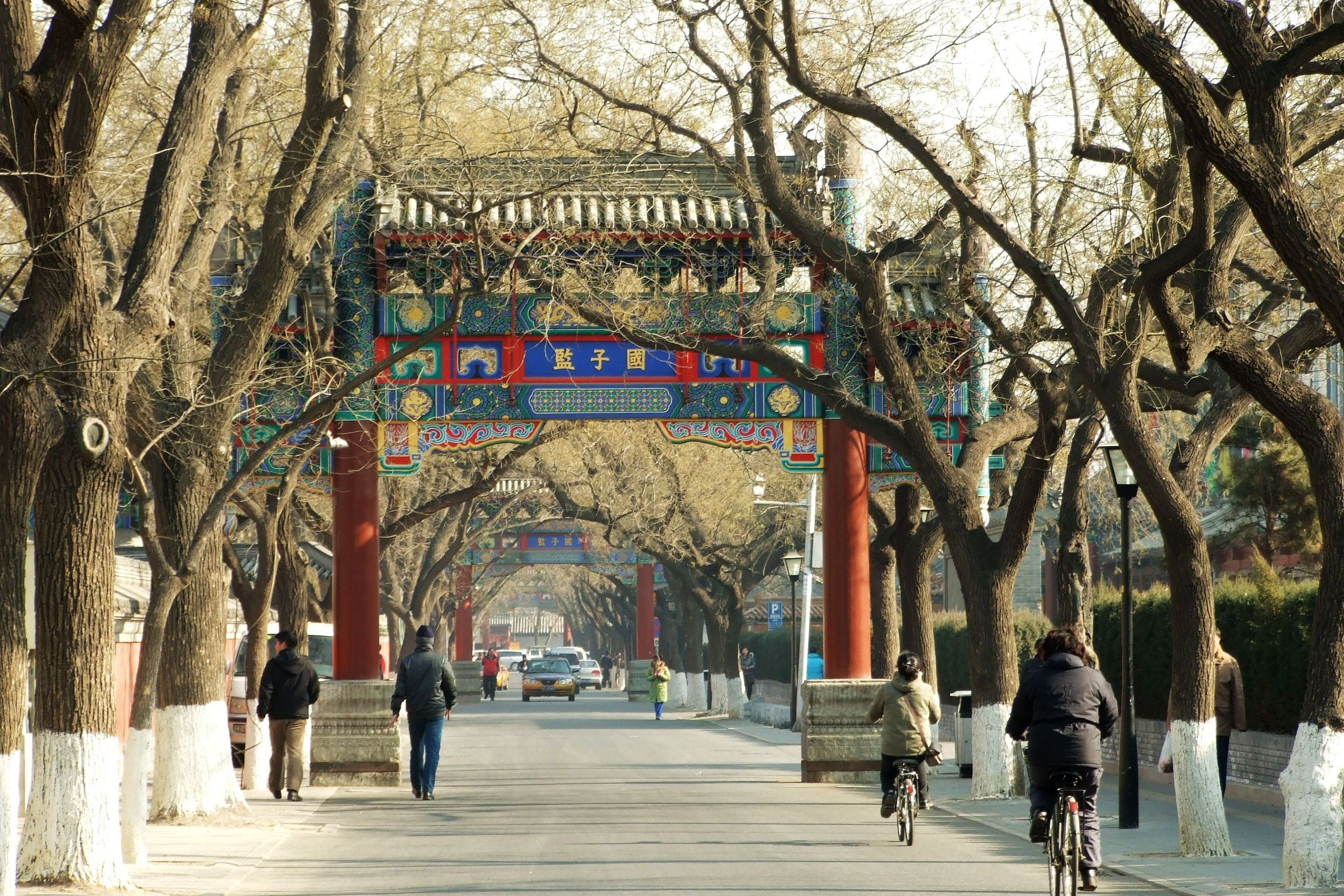
Entrance of Guozijian Street

Guozijian Street (Chinese: 国子监街; pinyin: Guózǐjiàn Jiē), formerly known as Chengxian Street (Chinese: 成贤街; pinyin: Chéngxián Jiē), is a street in Dongcheng District, Beijing. It is listed as an important historical site.

The Beijing Guozijian (Imperial College), dating to 1306, and a Temple of Confucius, built in 1302, are located in this street. The Yonghe Temple is located next to its east entrance.
