= Zhiyuan =

Zhiyuan may refer to:

- Chinese cruiser Zhiyuan (致遠), an imperial Chinese cruiser which sank during the First Sino-Japanese War (1894)

== Historical eras ==
- Zhiyuan (至元, 1264–1294), era under Kublai Khan, Mongol emperor
- Zhiyuan (至元, 1335–1340), era under Toghon Temür, Mongol emperor
