= Yonghe Temple =

Tibetan Buddhist temple and monastery in Beijing, China

- 雍和宮
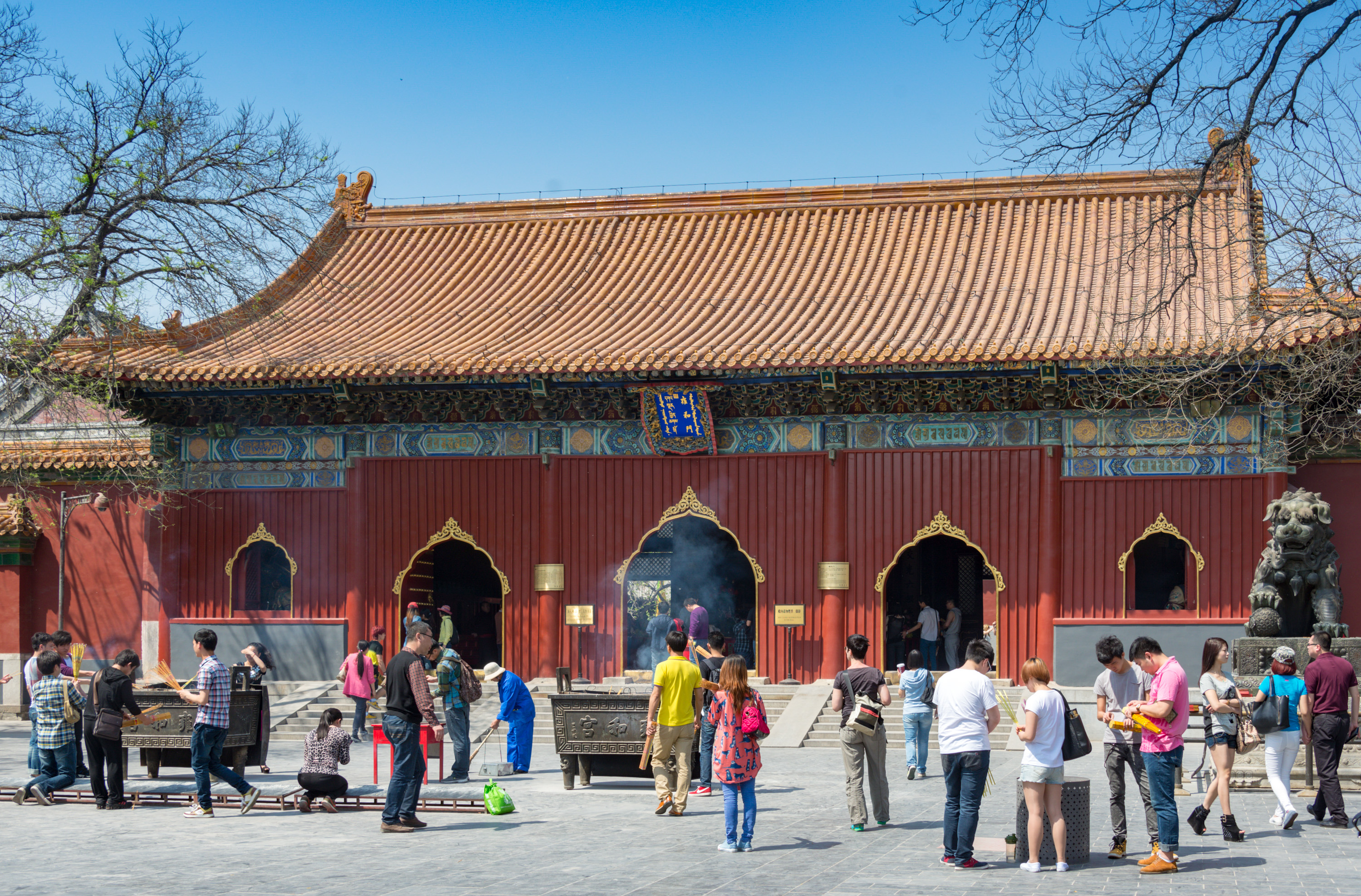

- Location within Beijing

Religion
- Affiliation: Buddhism
- Sect: Gelug school of Tibetan Buddhism

Location
- Location: Dongcheng District, Beijing, China
- Coordinates: 39°56′49″N 116°24′40″E

Architecture
- Style: Chinese architecture
- Founder: Yongzheng Emperor
- Established: 1694; 332 years ago

Yonghe Temple
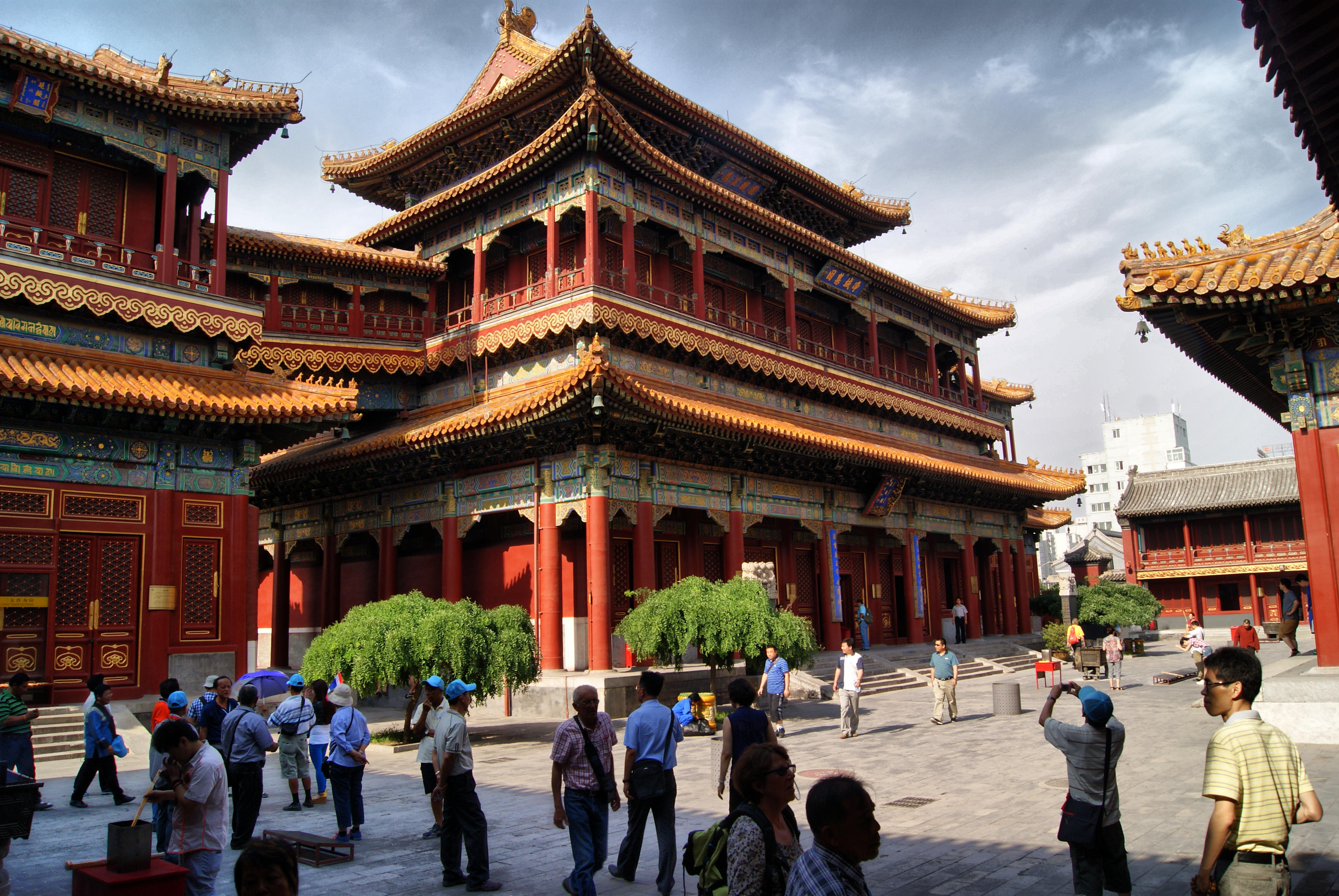

Chinese name
- Traditional Chinese: 雍和宮
- Simplified Chinese: 雍和宫
Transcriptions
Standard Mandarin
- Hanyu Pinyin: Yōnghé gōng
Yue: Cantonese
- Jyutping: jung1 wo4 gung1

Tibetan name
- Tibetan: དགའ་ལྡན་བྱིན་ཆགས་གླིང་
Transcriptions
- Wylie: dga' ldan byin chags gling

Mongolian name
- Mongolian Cyrillic: Найралт Найрамдах Сүм
- Mongolian script: ᠨᠠᠶᠢᠷᠠᠯᠲᠤ ᠨᠠᠶᠢᠷᠠᠮᠳᠠᠬᠤ ᠰᠦᠮ᠎ᠡ
Transcriptions
- SASM/GNC: nairalt nairamdakh suum

Manchu name
- Manchu script: ᡥᡡᠸᠠᠯᡳᠶᠠᠰᡠᠨ ᡥᡡᠸᠠᠯᡳᠶᠠᡴᠠ ᡤᡠᠩ
- Romanization: hūwaliyasun hūwaliyaka gung

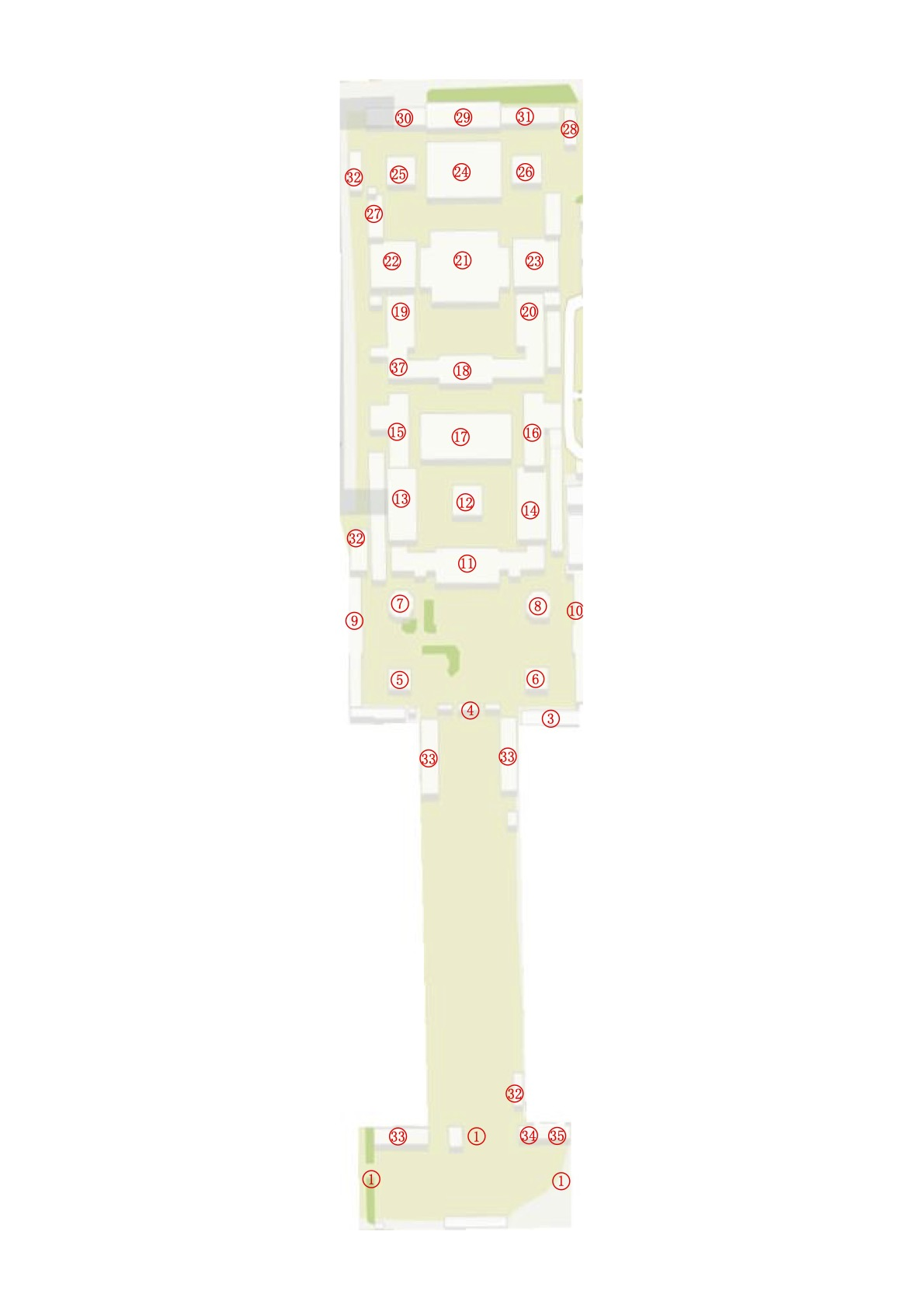
The Layout of Yonghe Temple

The Yonghe Temple (Chinese: 雍和宮; lit. 'Palace of Harmony and Peace'; also known as the Yonghe Lamasery or Lama Temple) is a temple and monastery of the Gelug school of Tibetan Buddhism located on 12 Yonghegong Street, Dongcheng District, Beijing, China. The building and artwork of the temple is a combination of Han Chinese and Tibetan styles. This building is one of the largest Tibetan Buddhist monasteries in China proper. The current abbot is Lama Hu Xuefeng. Yonghe Temple was the highest Buddhist temple in the country during the middle and late Qing dynasty.

== History ==
Building work on the Yonghe Temple started in 1694 during the Qing dynasty on the site where originally stood an official residence for court eunuchs of the Ming dynasty. It was then converted into the residence of Yinzhen (Prince Yong), the fourth son of the Kangxi Emperor. The Kangxi Emperor awarded this building to Yinzhen in 1702, who was at the time a junwang (second-rank prince). Yinzhen moved into this building in May 1703. The Kangxi Emperor promoted Yinzhen from junwang to qinwang (first-rank prince) under the title "Prince Yong of the First Rank" (和碩雍親王; Héshuò Yōng Qīnwáng; Manchu: hošoi hūwaliyasun cin wang) in 1709. The name of this building was thus changed into 'the Residence of Prince Yong of the First Rank' (雍親王府) in the same year. In 1711, Hongli, the fourth son of Yongzheng, the future Qianlong Emperor, was born in the East Academy (东书院) in this building.

Prince Yong ascended the throne as the Yongzheng Emperor in 1722, and the Residence of Prince Yong of the First Rank was later promoted into the 'Palace of Peace and Harmony' (雍和宫). After the Yongzheng Emperor's death in 1735, his coffin was placed in the temple from 1735 to 1737. Before the Yonghe Temple was converted into a monastery, the Grand Secretariat Ortai had once proposed that Hongzhou (Prince He) should take the Yonghe Palace as his private residence, but this suggestion was denied by the Qianlong Emperor. The Qianlong Emperor, who succeeded the Yongzheng Emperor, gave the temple imperial status signified by having its turquoise tiles replaced with yellow tiles which were reserved for the emperor. In 1744, the Qianlong Emperor issued an edict of converting the Palace of Peace and Harmony into a lamasery, and the following Buddhābhiṣeka (开光 Kaiguang) of the Buddhist figure was executed in 1745.

Subsequently, the monastery became a residence for large numbers of Tibetan Buddhist monks from Mongolia and Tibet, and so the Yonghe Lamasery became the national centre of Lama administration. Since 1792, with the foundation of the Golden Urn, the Yonghe Temple also became a place for the Qing dynasty to exert control over the Tibetan and Mongolian lama reincarnations.

The temple was the site of an armed revolt against the Chinese Nationalist government in 1929.

After the Chinese Civil War ended in 1949, the temple was declared a national monument and closed for the following 32 years. It is said to have survived the Cultural Revolution due to the intervention of Premier Zhou Enlai. Reopened to the public in 1981, it is today both a functioning temple and highly popular tourist attraction in the city.

== Administration ==
After the Yonghegong Temple was converted into a monastery, its management can be divided into two parts: administrative affairs management and religious affairs management. In terms of administration, the Yonghe Temple is treated as an imperial Tibetan Buddhist temple directly under the jurisdiction of the Qing dynasty. The emperor would appoint a prince or a junwang (second-rank prince) as the responsible of the temple's secular business, and delegate the actual management affairs to the Imperial Household Department and the Ministry of Foreign Affairs. The religious affairs of the Yonghe Temple are handled by a Khenpo lama (管理雍和宮總堪布喇嘛) as the head of the monastery. This position is usually held by lamas from Tibet, and is higher in status than the usual Zhasake (Manchu: jasak i da lama) lamas. It is worth noting that since 1936, the term used to address the religious head of the Yonghe Temple has changed from khenpo to abbot (CN: 住持).

== Layout ==
(See the map attached)

- Memorial Archway
- Imperial Carriage Pathway
- Toilet
- Zhaotai Gate
- Drum tower
- Bell tower
- West Stele Pavilion
- East Stele Pavilion
- West Ase Gate
- East Ase Gate
- Yonghe Gate Hall
- Four-Language Stele Pavilion
- Exoteric Hall
- Esoteric Hall
- Shilun Hall
- Medicine Hall
- Yonghegong Hal
- Yongyou Hall
- West Side Hall
- Eate Side Hall
- Falun Hall
- Jietai Building
- Panchen Building
- Wanfuge Pavilion
- Yansui Pavilion
- Yongkang Pavilion
- Yamudaga Building
- Zhaofo Building
- Suicheng Hall
- West Shunshan Building
- East Shunshan Building
- The Residence of A Jia Rinpoche
- Souvenir store
- Ticket Center
- Reception
- Tourist Center
- Buddhābhiṣeka Center

== Architecture and artworks ==
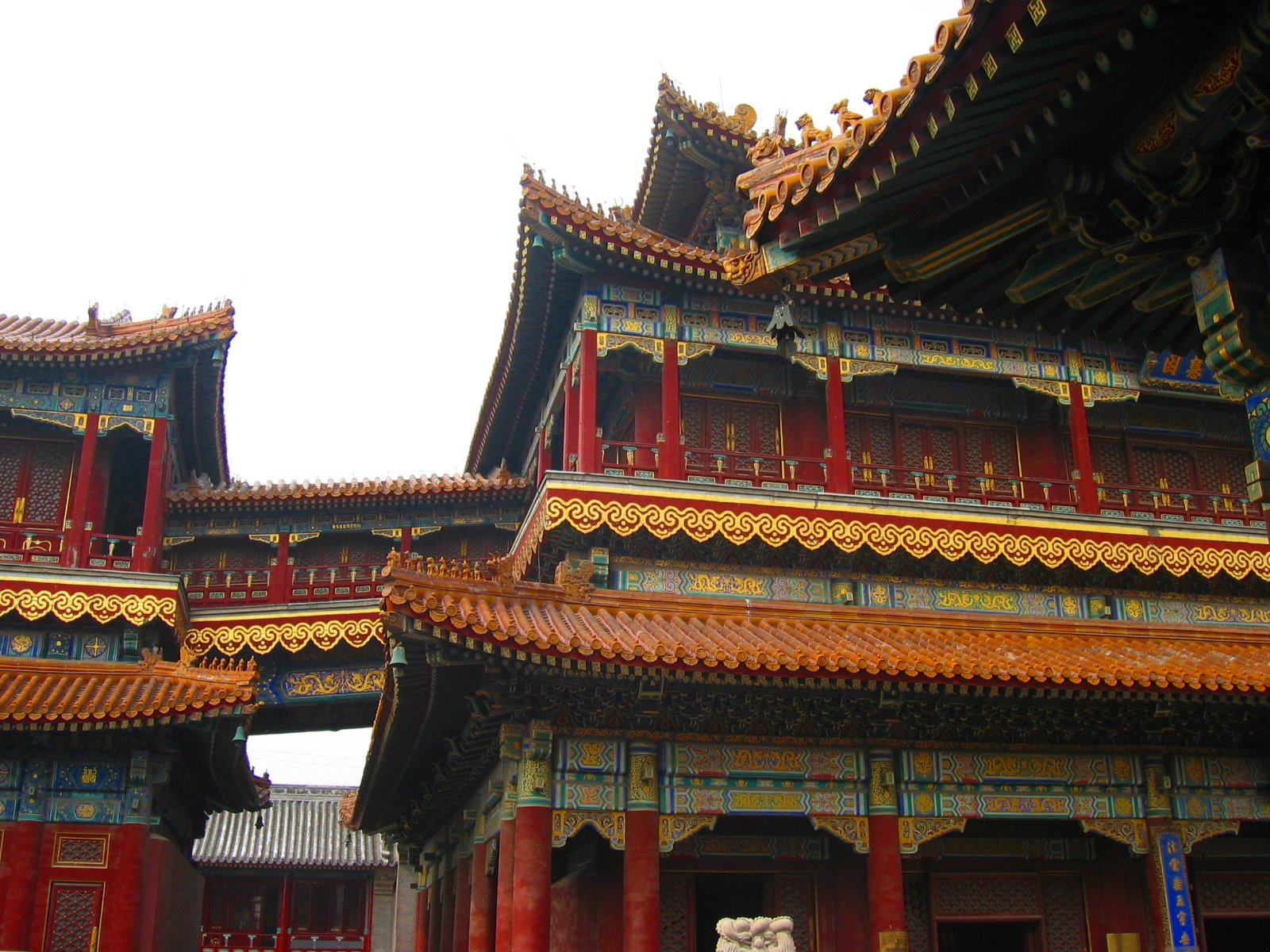
A close-up of the temple

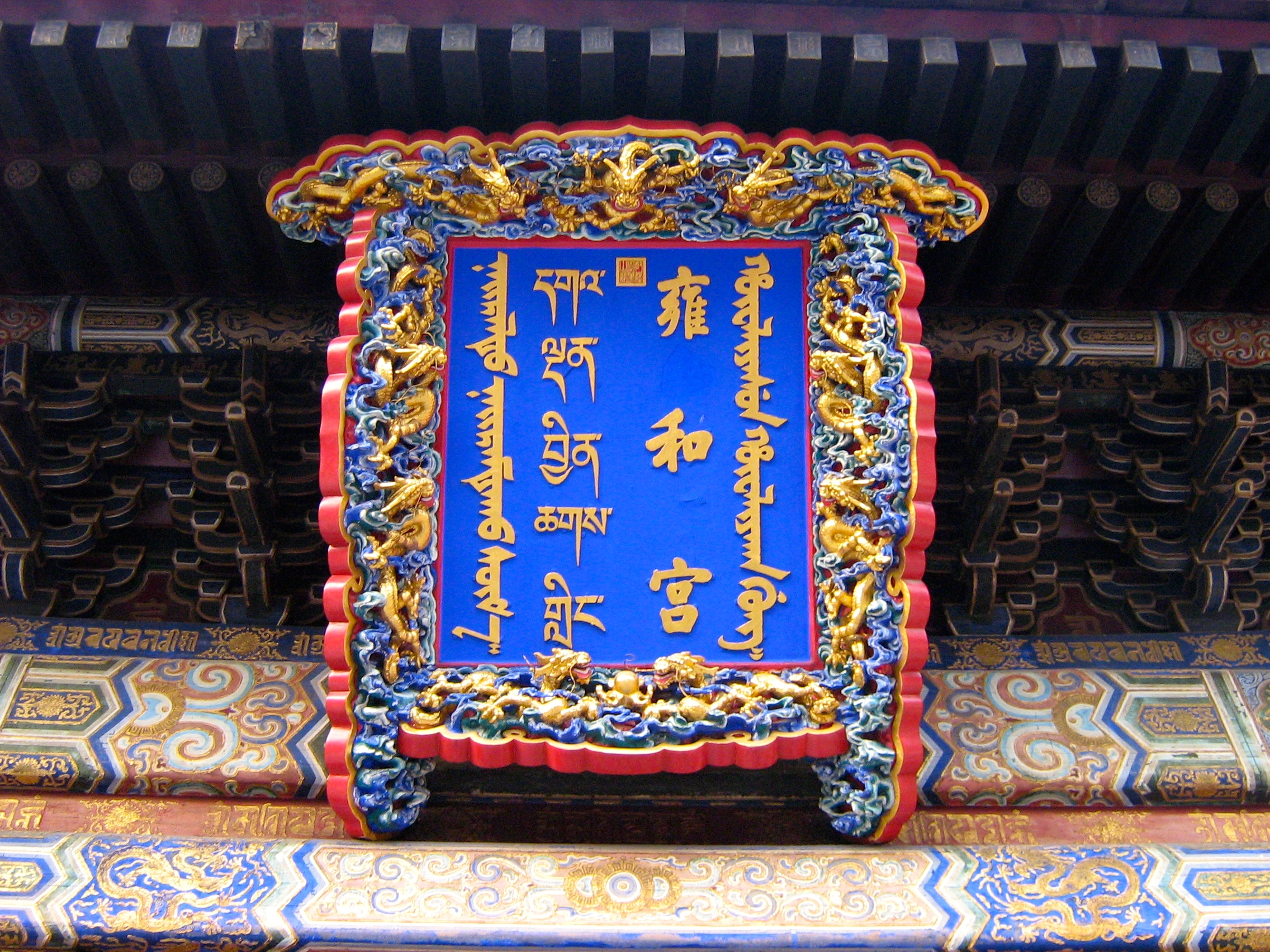
Board of Yonghe Temple

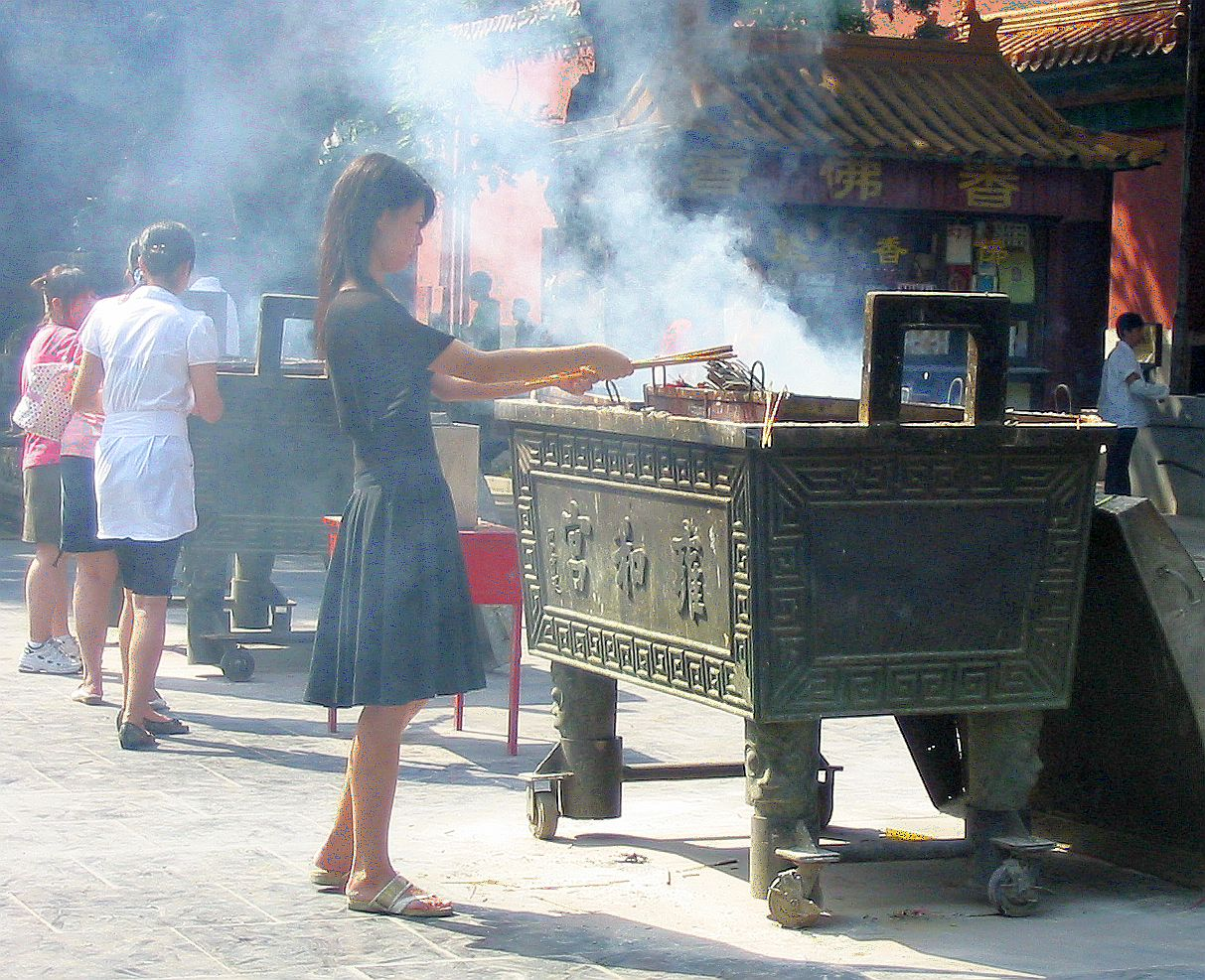
A censer at Yonghe Temple

The Yonghe Temple is arranged along a north–south central axis, which has a length of 480 metres (1,570 ft), and covers an area of 66,400 square kilometres (25,600 sq mi). The main gate, the Gate of Clarity and Prosperity (Zhaotaimen) is at the southern end of this axis, along with three memorial archways in the front. And a path built for imperial carriages (Niandao) is situated between the front memorial archway and the Gate of Clarity and Prosperity. Along the axis, there are five main halls which are separated by courtyards: the Gate Hall of Harmony and Peace (Yonghemendian), the Hall of Harmony and Peace (Yonghegong), the Hall of Everlasting Protection (Yongyoudian), the Hall of the Wheel of the Law (Falundian), and the Pavilion of Ten Thousand Happinesses (Wanfuge).

The Gate Hall of Harmony and Peace is the southernmost of the main halls, it served originally as the main entrance of the palace, but was later changed into the Hall of Heavenly Kings (Tianwangdian). In the center of the hall stands a statue of the Maitreya Buddha, along the walls statues of the four Heavenly Kings are arranged. There sit two stele pavilions in front of the Gate Hall of Harmony and Peace, which contain the stele of the Yonghe Temple and the stele of the Discourse of Lamas.

The Hall of Harmony and Peace is the main building of the temple. It houses three bronze statues of the Buddhas of the Three Ages, the statue of the Gautama Buddha (Buddha of the Present) is in the center, it is flanked by the statue of Dīpankara Buddha (Buddha of the Past, right) and the Maitreya Buddha (Buddha of the Future, left). Along the sides of the hall, the statues of the 18 Arhats are placed. A mural in the hall shows the bodhisattva Avalokitesvara.

The Hall of Everlasting Protection was Emperor Yongzheng's living quarters as a prince and the place where his coffin was placed after his death. Today, a statue of the Bhaisajya-guru (healing Buddha) stands in this hall.

The Hall of the Wheel of the Law functions as a place for reading scriptures and conducting religious ceremonies. It contains a large statue of Je Tsongkhapa, founder of the Geluk School. The hall also contains the Five-Hundred-Arhat-Hill, a carving made of red sandalwood with statues of the arhats made from five different metals (gold, silver, copper, iron, and tin).

The Pavilion of Ten Thousand Happinesses is connected to the Pavilion of Eternal Health to the east and the Pavilion of Prolonged Peace to the west by covered bridges. The Pavilion of Ten Thousand Happinesses (sometimes referred to as "The Hall of Boundless Happiness") contains an 18-metre (59 ft) tall (with an additional 8 metres (26 ft) underground, making it 26 metres (85 ft) in total) statue of the Maitreya Buddha carved from a single piece of White Sandalwood. This was a gift from the seventh Dalai Lama to the Qianlong Emperor and took three years to transport from Tibet to Beijing. The statue is one of three artworks in the Temple which were included in the Guinness Book of Records in 1993.

=== Three fabulous artworks ===
- three bronze statues of the Buddhas of the Three Ages
- Five-Hundred-Arhat-Hill
- 18m tall White Sandalwood statue of the Maitreya Buddha

=== Two steles ===
The Yonghe Temple contains two steles built during the reign of the Qianlong Emperor. Both of them are written in Chinese, Manchu, Tibetan, and Mongolian. The first one is the Yonghegong Stele, erected in 1744, signaling the palace's conversion into a lama monastery. The second one is The Discourse of Lama, a stele erected in 1792, which is written by the Qianlong Emperor to target the wrongdoing of the Tibetan lamas in handling the reincarnation issues. Both steles are well-preserved in the two pavilions in front of the Yonghe Gate.

== Cham Dance ==
Being a Tibetan Buddhist temple, the Yonghe temple also inherits rituals and dances from Tibet. The temple has adopted the tradition of the Cham dance, or bujak in Manchu, shortly after its conversion into a lama monastery. The first record of the practice of cham dance in Yonghe Temple was first found in 1746, at a banquet hosted by the Qianlong emperor in hosting a Dzungar envoy. This ritual is hosted on every 28th day of the 12th lunar month and the fourth day of the first lunar month in the period after its foundation. During the reign of the Guangxu Emperor, the tradition was rescheduled as an eight-day performance starts from the 23rd of the first lunar year to the 1st of the second lunar year. Due to the closure of the Yonghe Temple in the Cultural Revolution period, the cham dance was also suspended. It was not revived until 1987.

== Location ==
The Yonghe Temple is located in Beijing's Dongcheng District, near the northeastern corner of the Second Ring Road. The postal address is: 12 Yonghegong Dajie, Beixinqiao, Dongcheng District, Beijing. The Yonghe Temple and the Forbidden City are about five kilometers apart, about an hour's walk away.

== Transport ==
Lines 2 and 5 of the Beijing Subway both stop at Yonghegong Lama Temple station, as do a number of city buses.

== Gallery ==
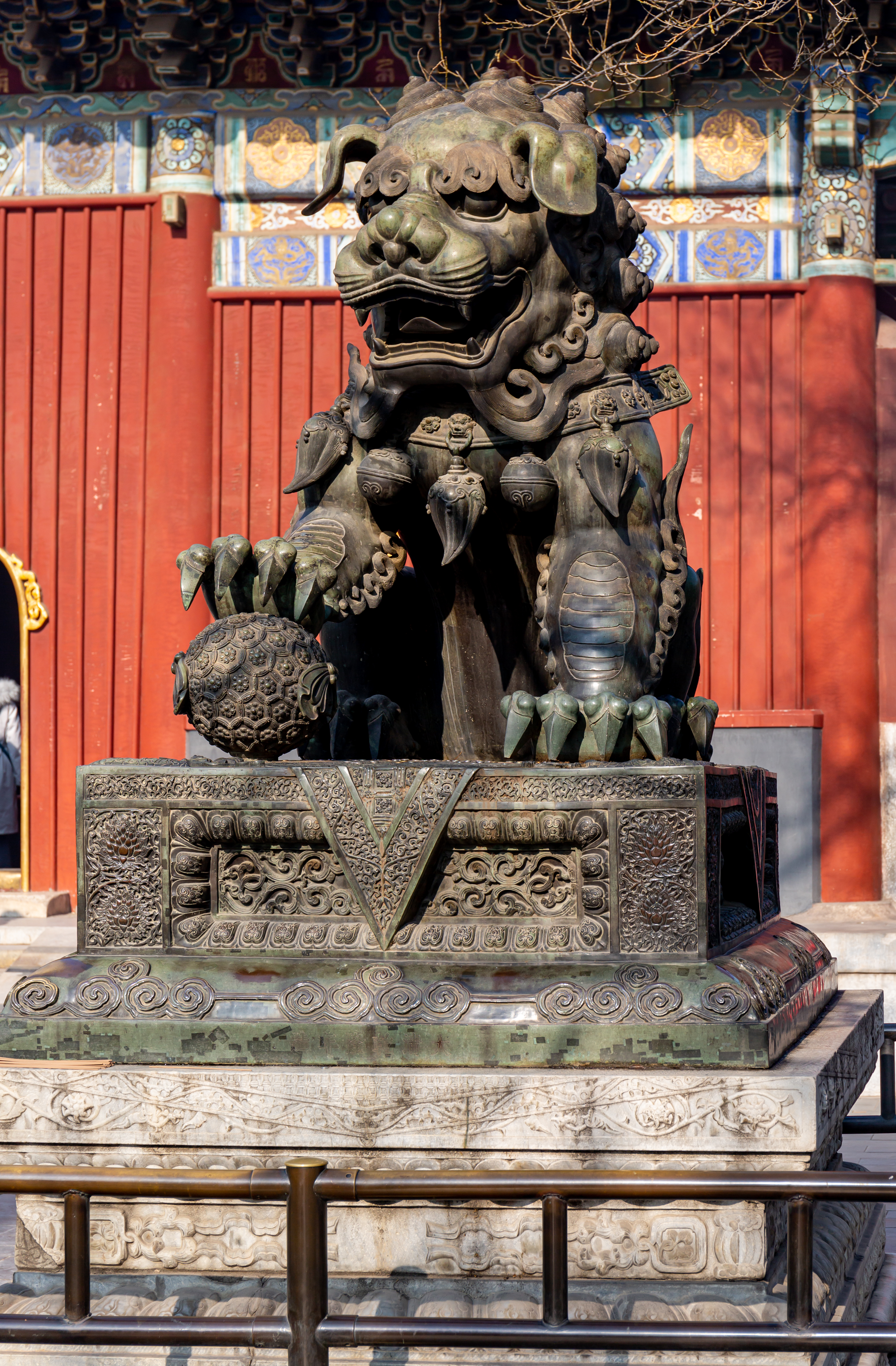
A Chinese guardian lion outside the temple

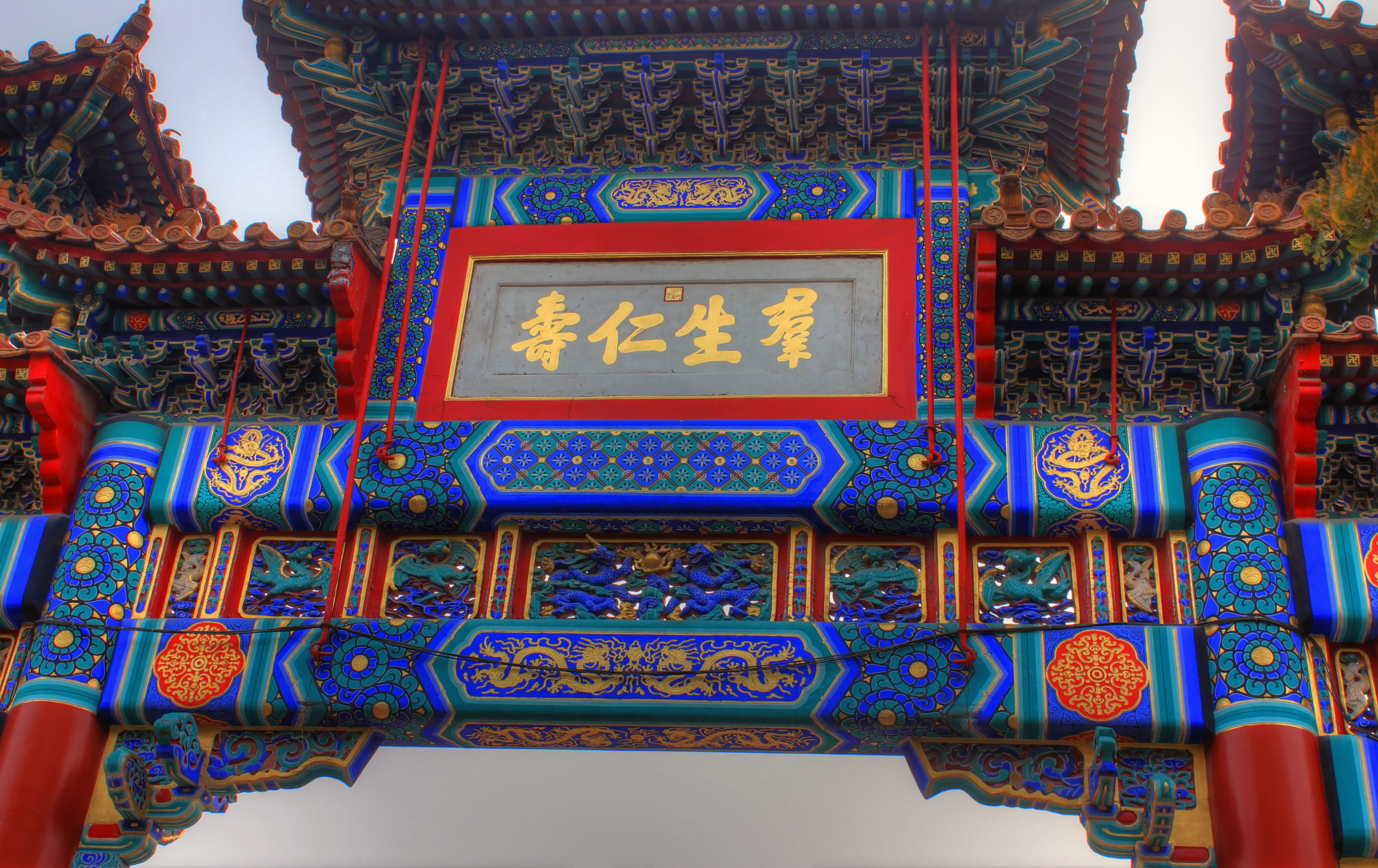
A pailou with 群生仁壽 inscribed on it, at the entrance to the temple

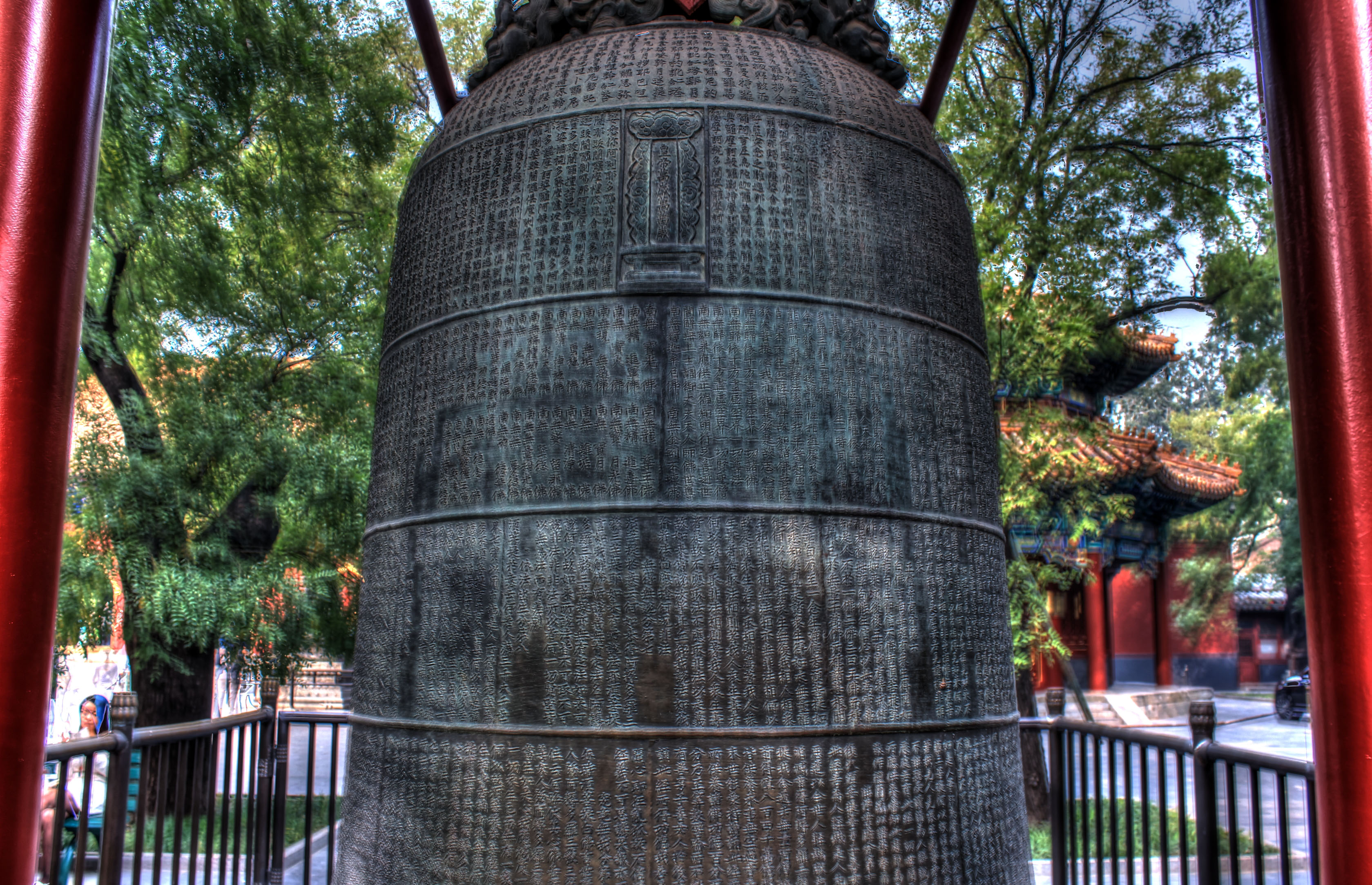
A giant ancient bell

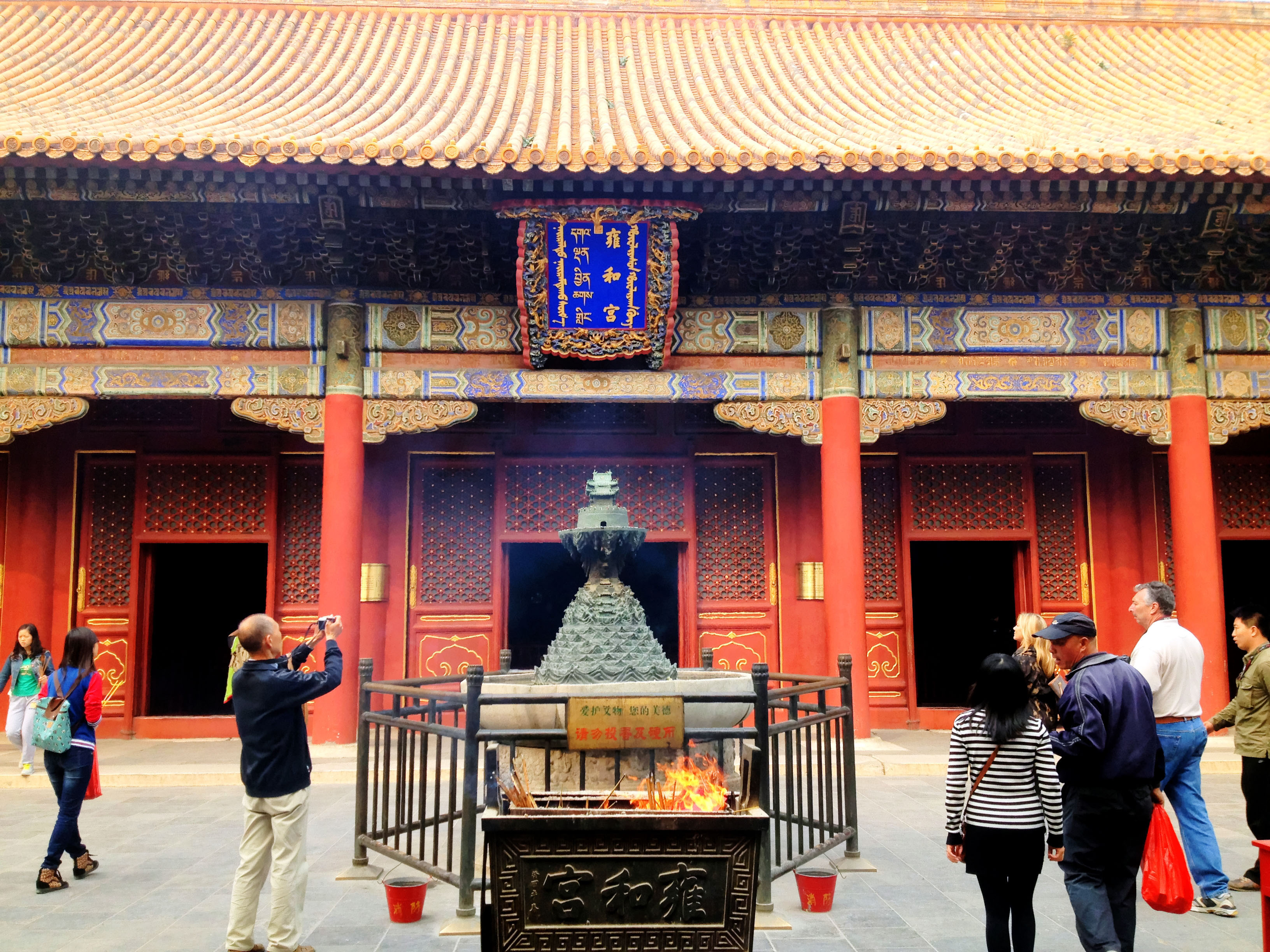
The Hall of Harmony and Peace (雍和宮)

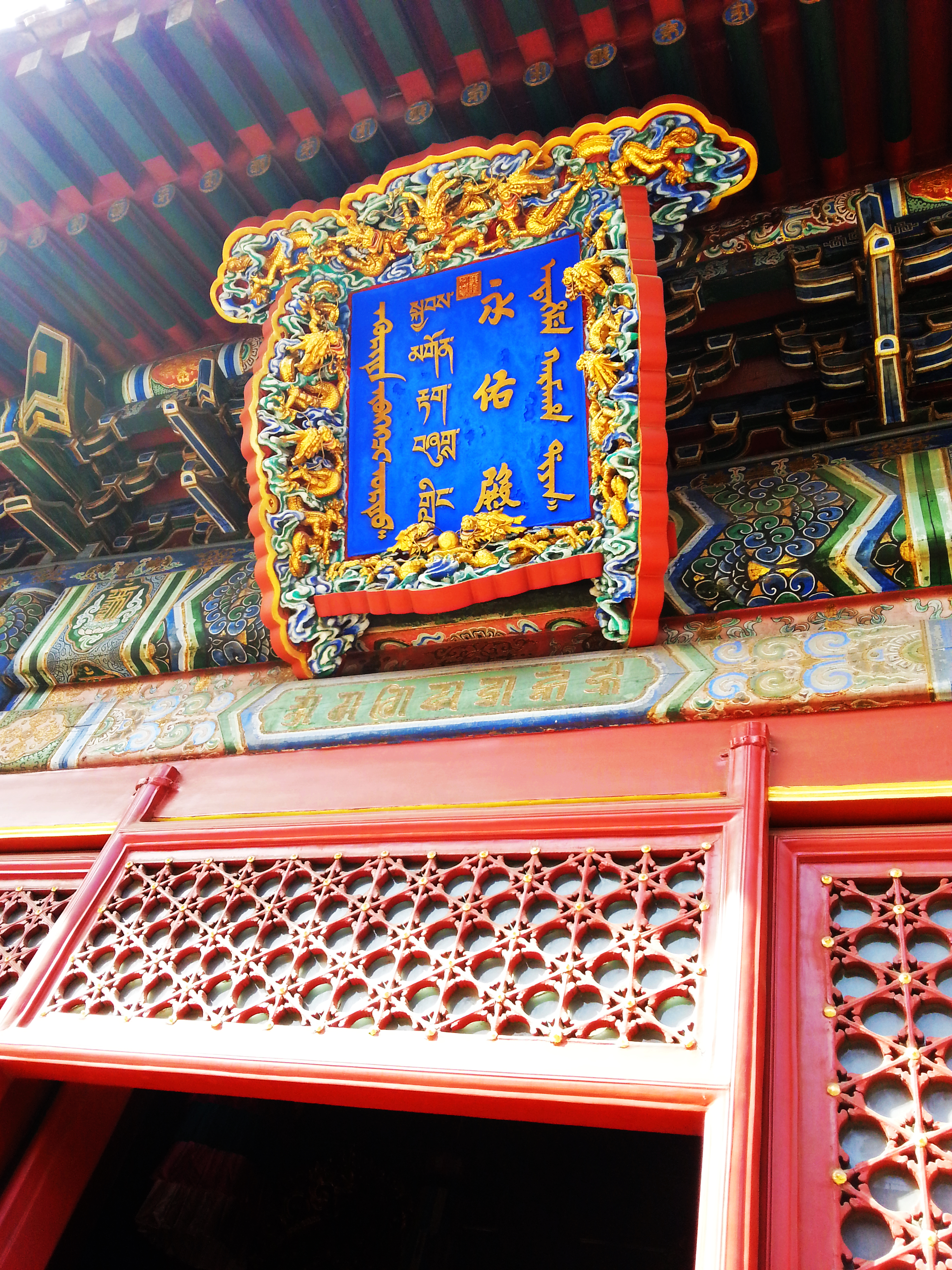
The Hall of Everlasting Protection (永佑殿)

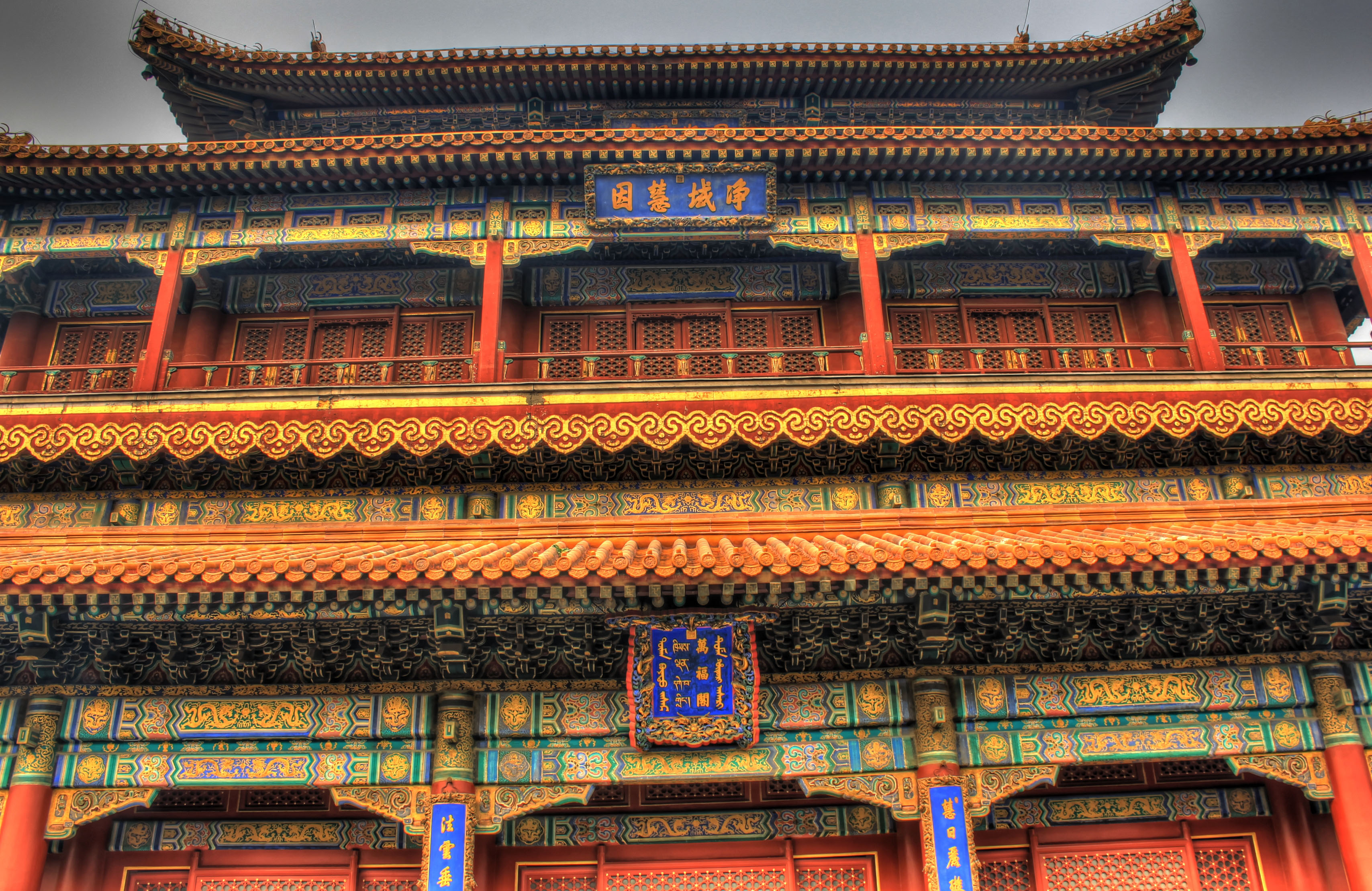
The Pavilion of Ten Thousand Happinesses (萬福閣)

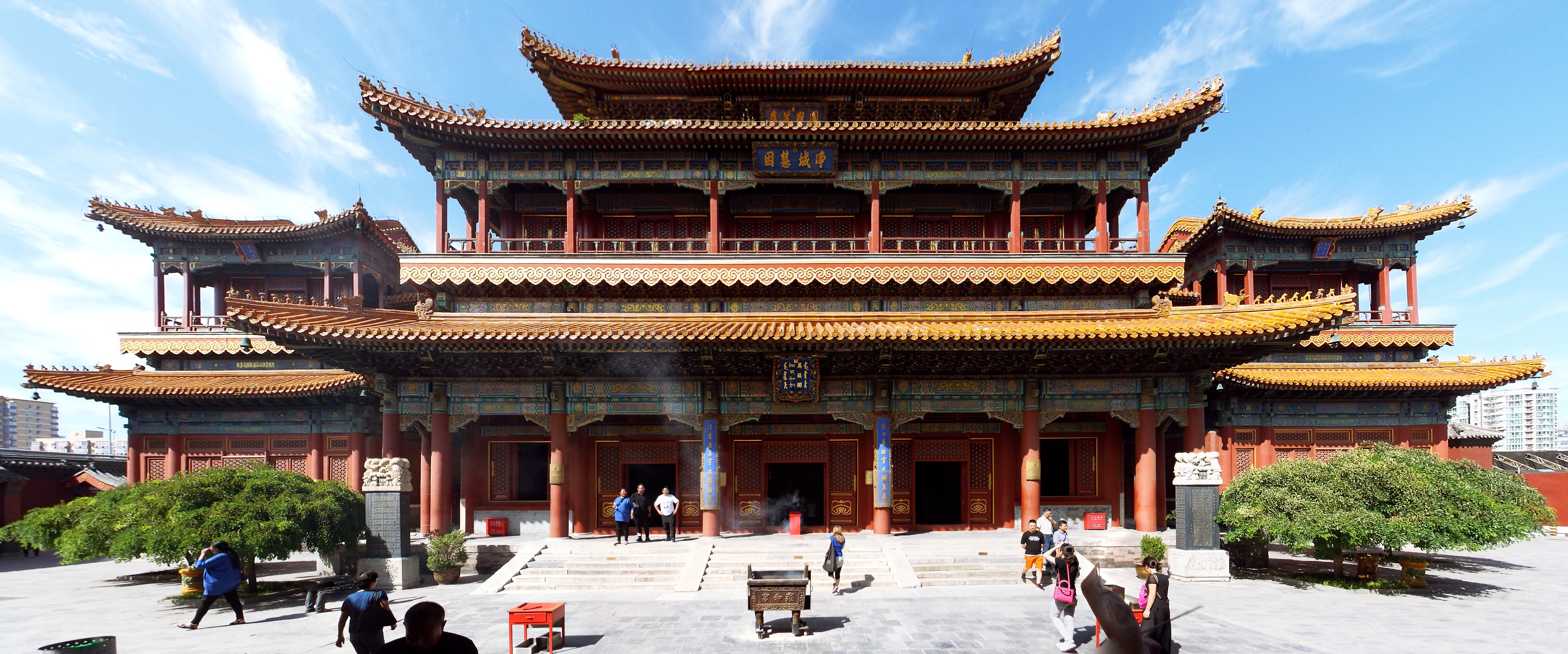
The Pavilion of Ten Thousand Happinesses

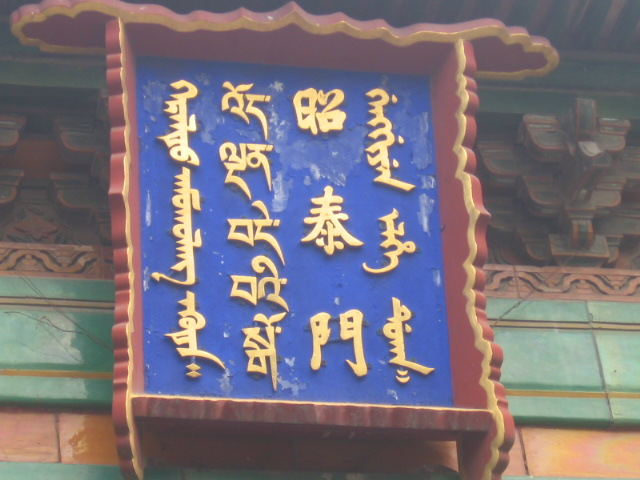
A sign of Symbol Thriving Gate (昭泰門)

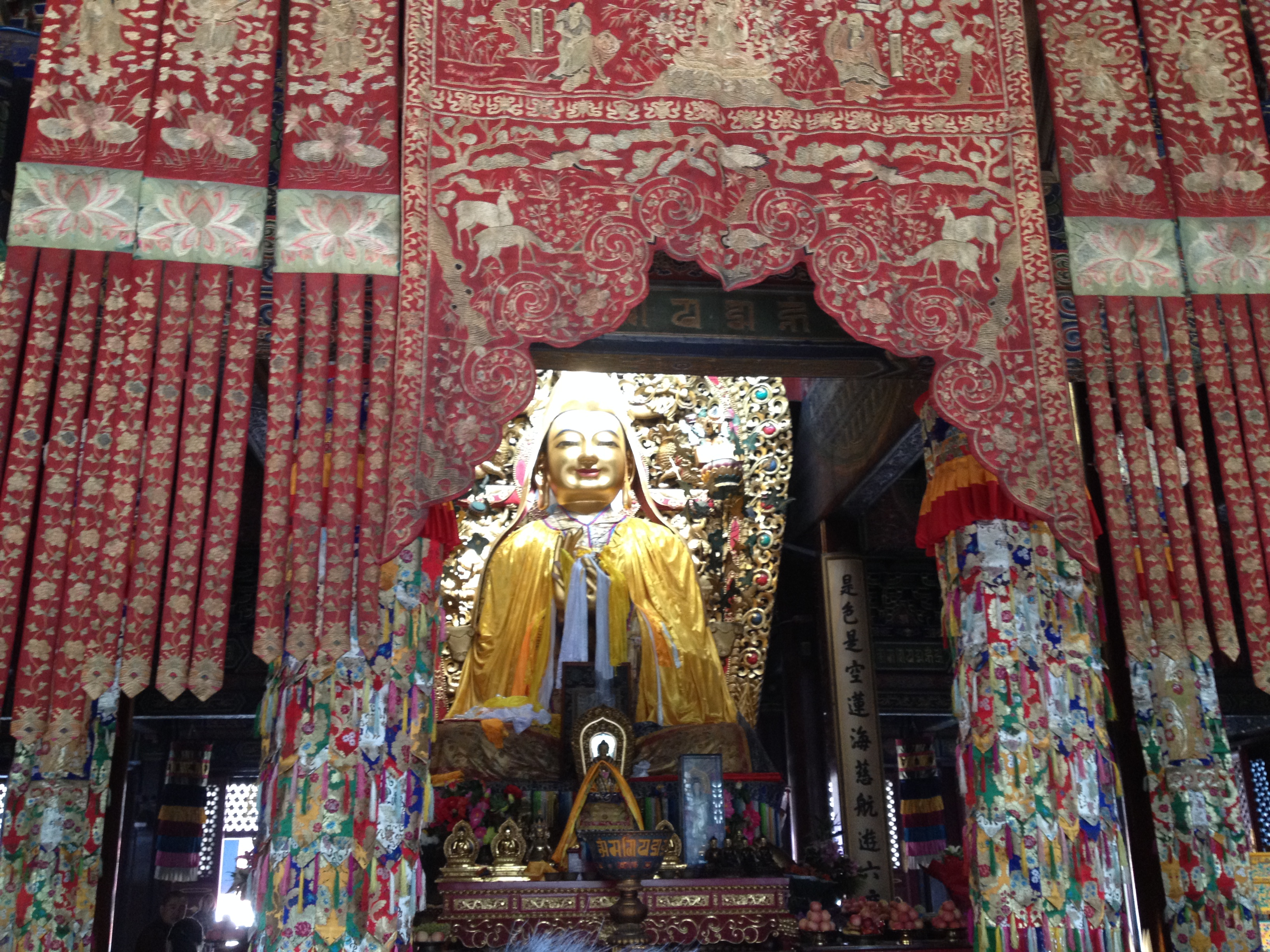
Statue of Tsongkhapa

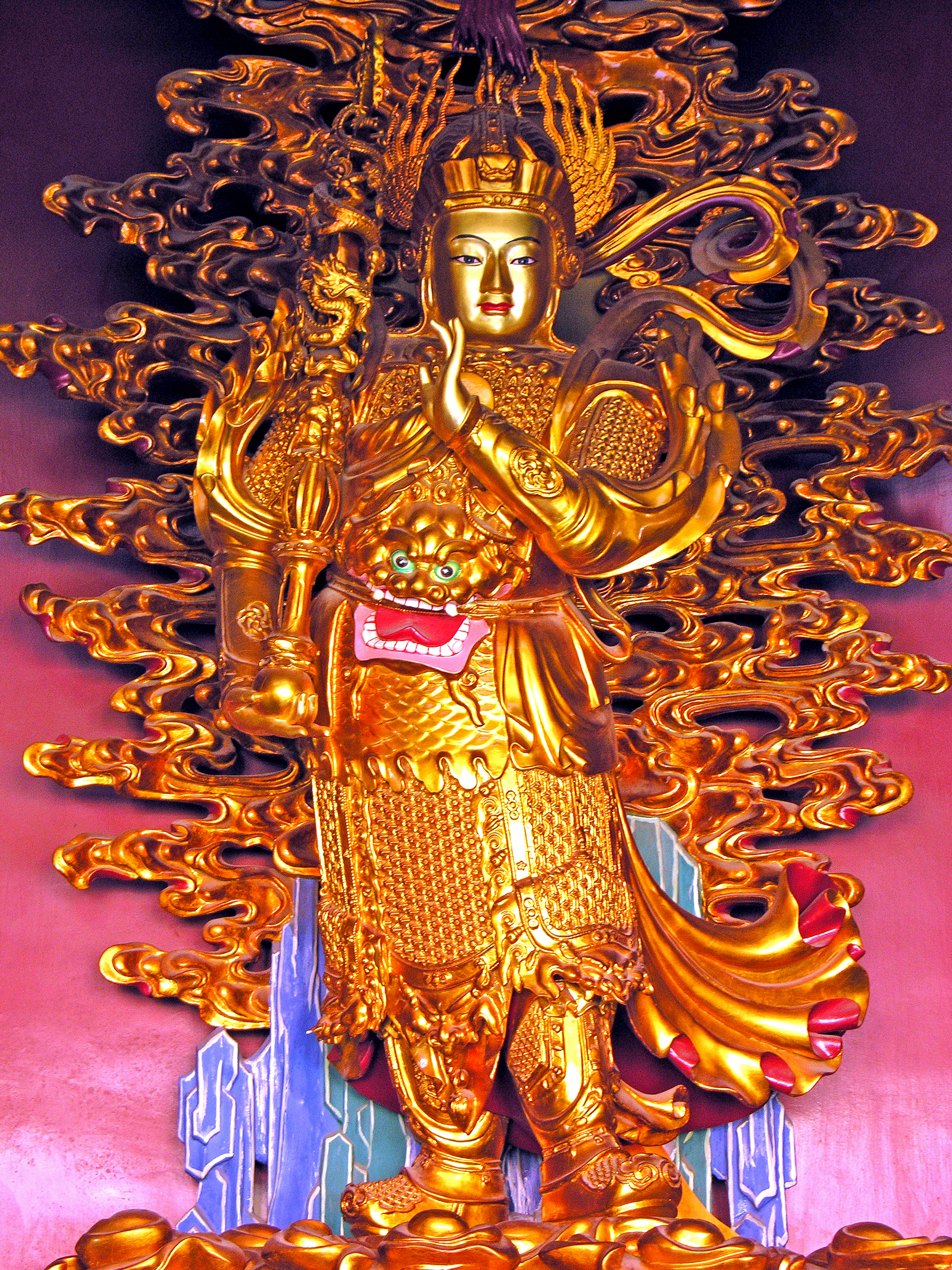
Statue of Wei Tuo

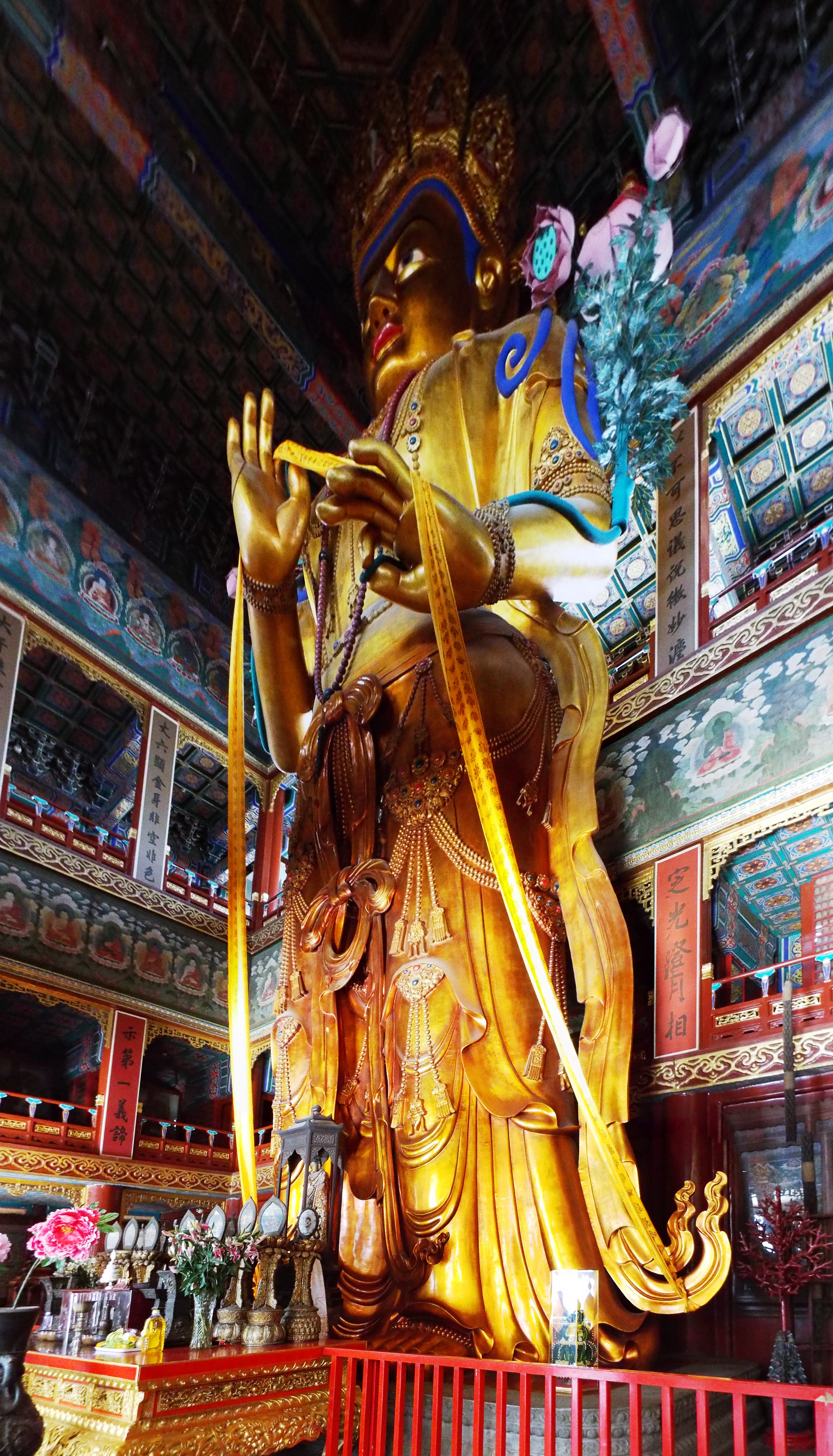
Statue of the Maitreya Buddha

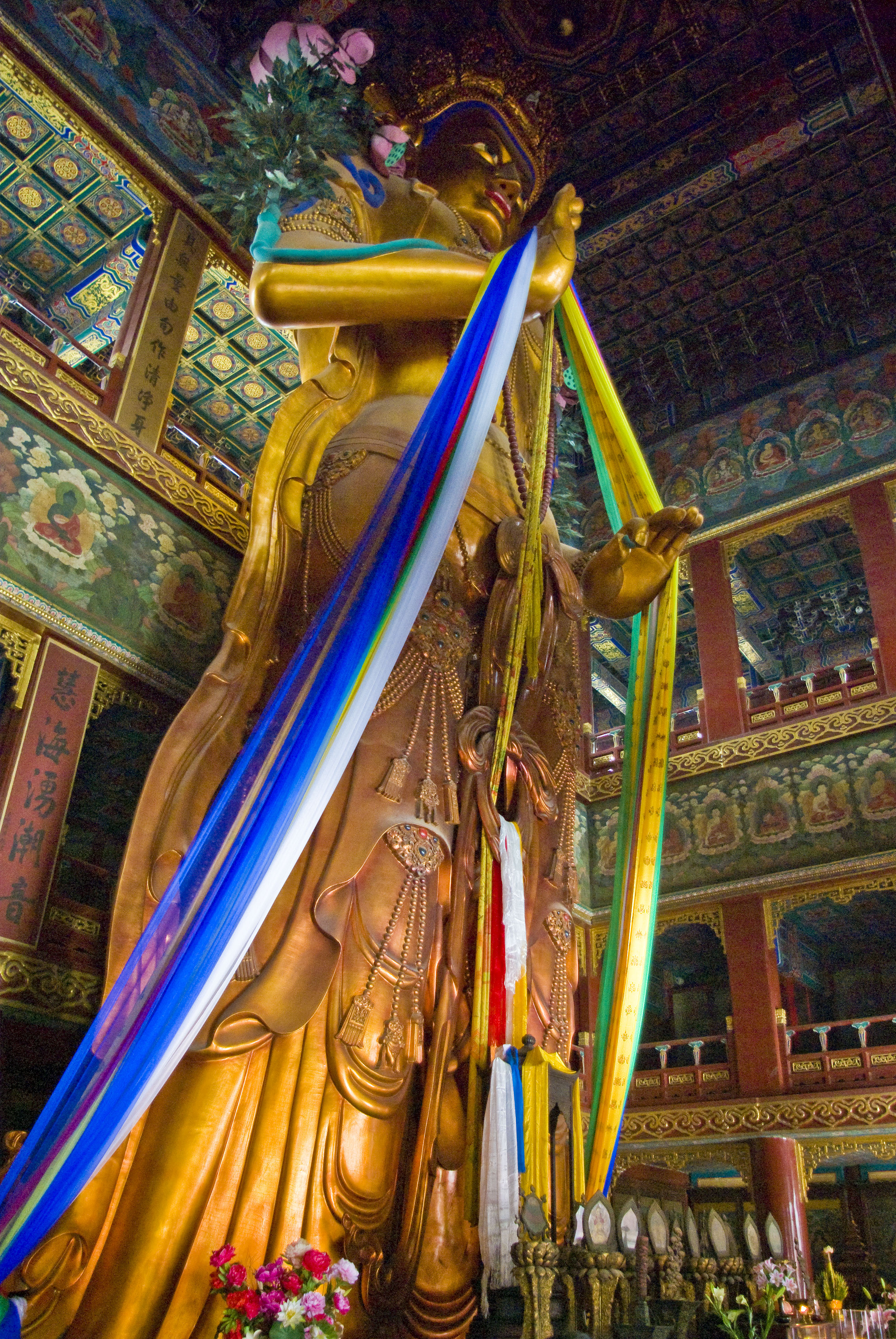
Statue of the Maitreya Buddha

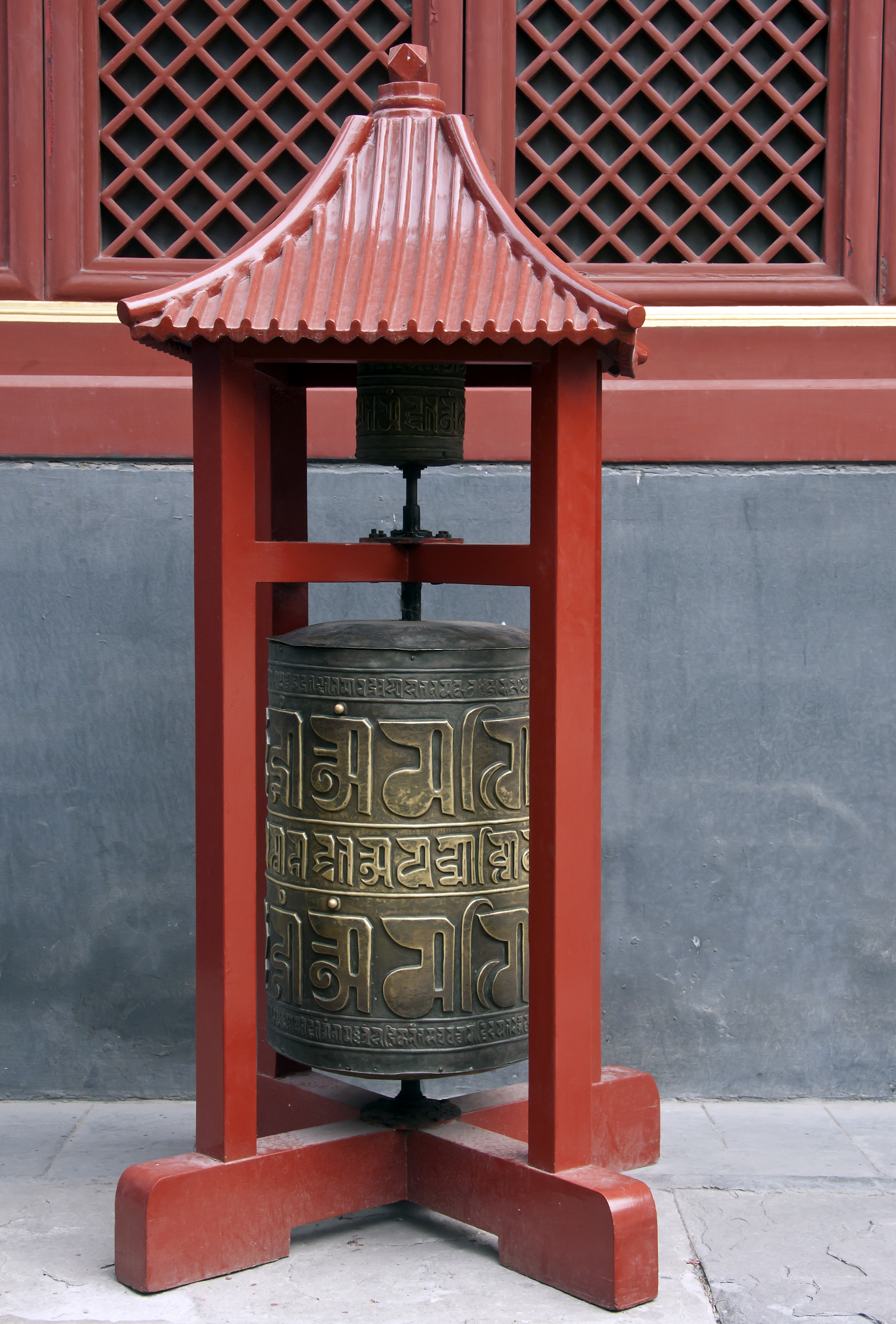
A prayer wheel

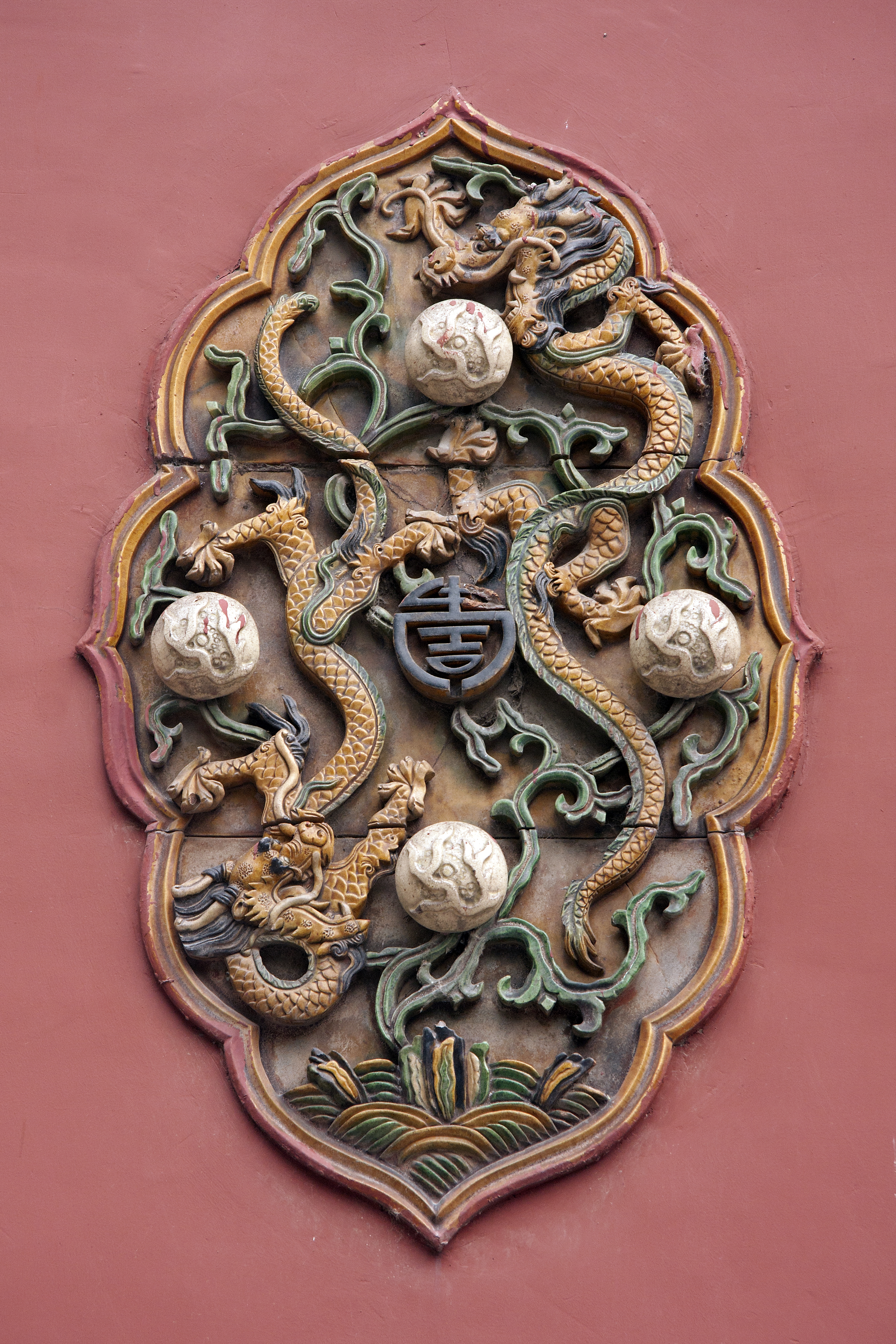
A wall decoration

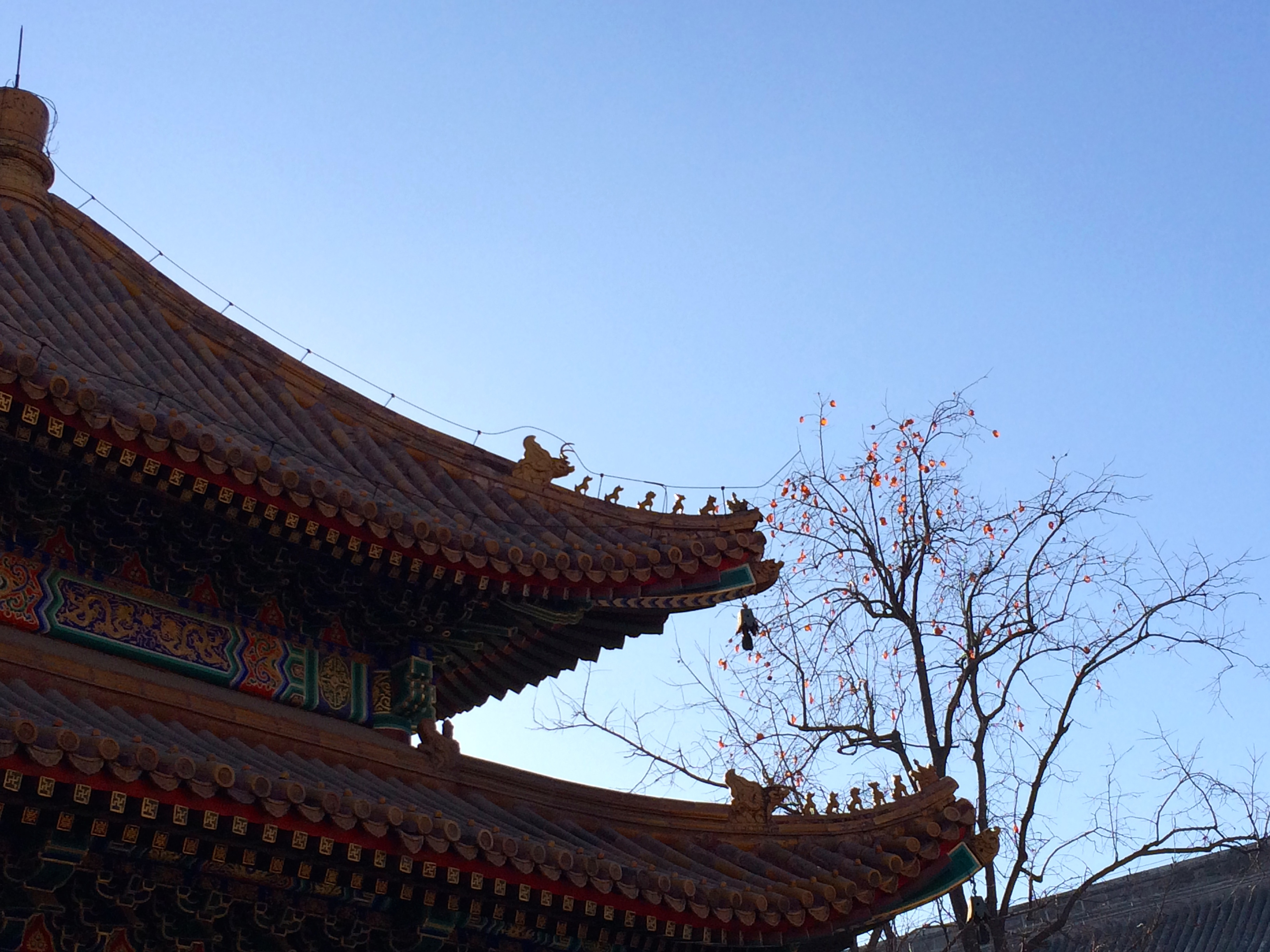
Roof at Yonghe Temple

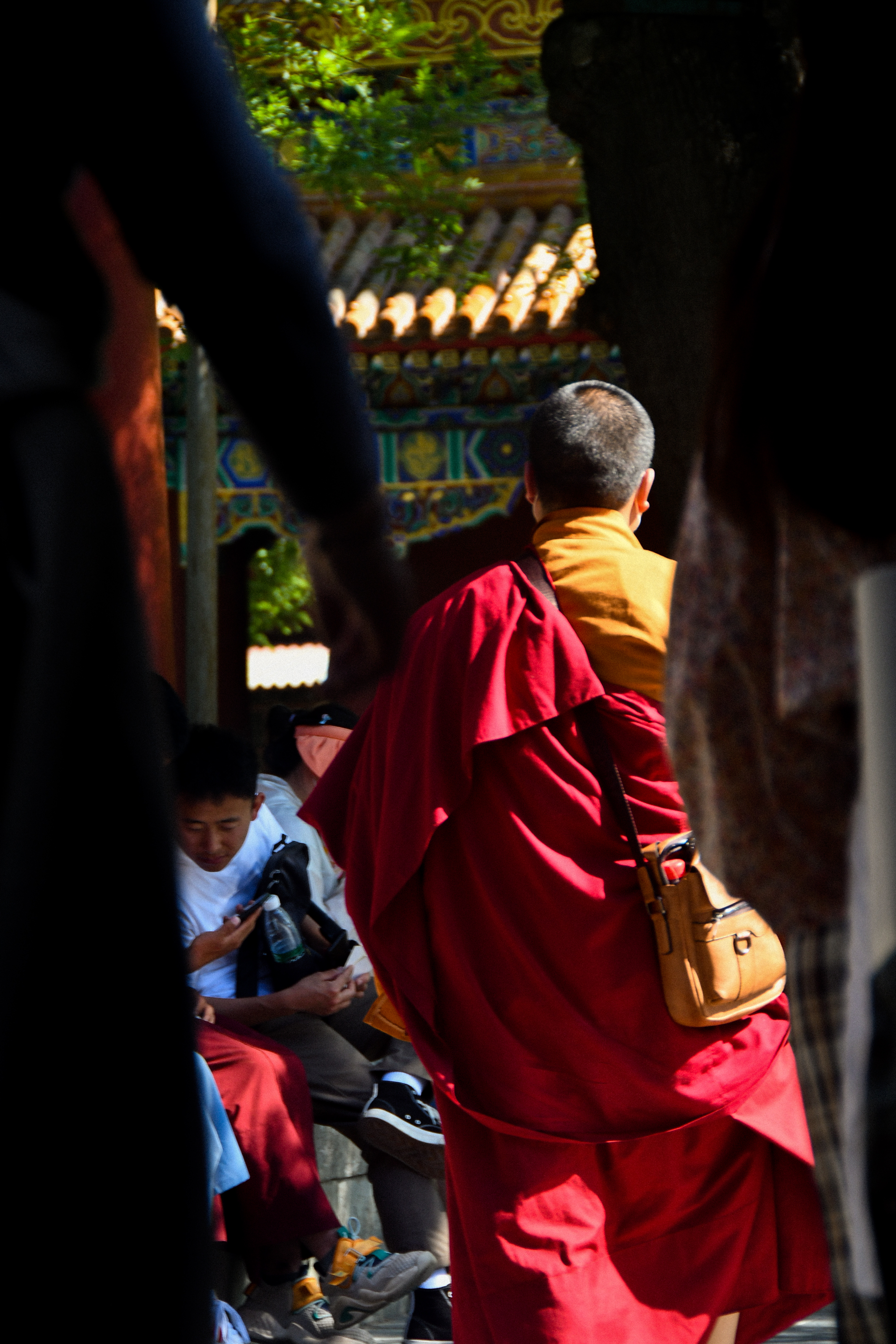
Monks in the Yonghe Temple

== See also ==
- Nine Altars and Eight Temples
