= Jianguomen =

- Simplified Chinese: 建国门
- Traditional Chinese: 建國門
- Literal meaning: Gate of Construction of a nation
Transcriptions
Standard Mandarin
- Hanyu Pinyin: Jiànguómén

Jianguomen may refer to:

- Jianguomen (Beijing), a gate of the city wall of Beijing, now demolished
  - Jianguomen Subdistrict, an administrative subdivision and a neighbourhood of Beijing
  - Jianguomen station, a mass transit railway station
- Jianguomen (Xi'an)

== See also ==
- Jianguomen Inner Street, Beijing
- Jianguomen Outer Street, Beijing
- Tian Mingjian incident, also known as Jianguomen incident
- Jianguo Road (disambiguation)
