= Dongsi =

Dongsi may refer to the following places in China:

- Dongsi Subdistrict, Beijing, a subdistrict in Beijing
- Dongsi Subdistrict, Haicheng (东四街道), a subdistrict in Haicheng, Liaoning
- Dongsi Township (东泗乡), a township in Longhai City, Fujian
