= Beijing Ancient Observatory =

Historic observatory in Dongcheng District, Beijing, China

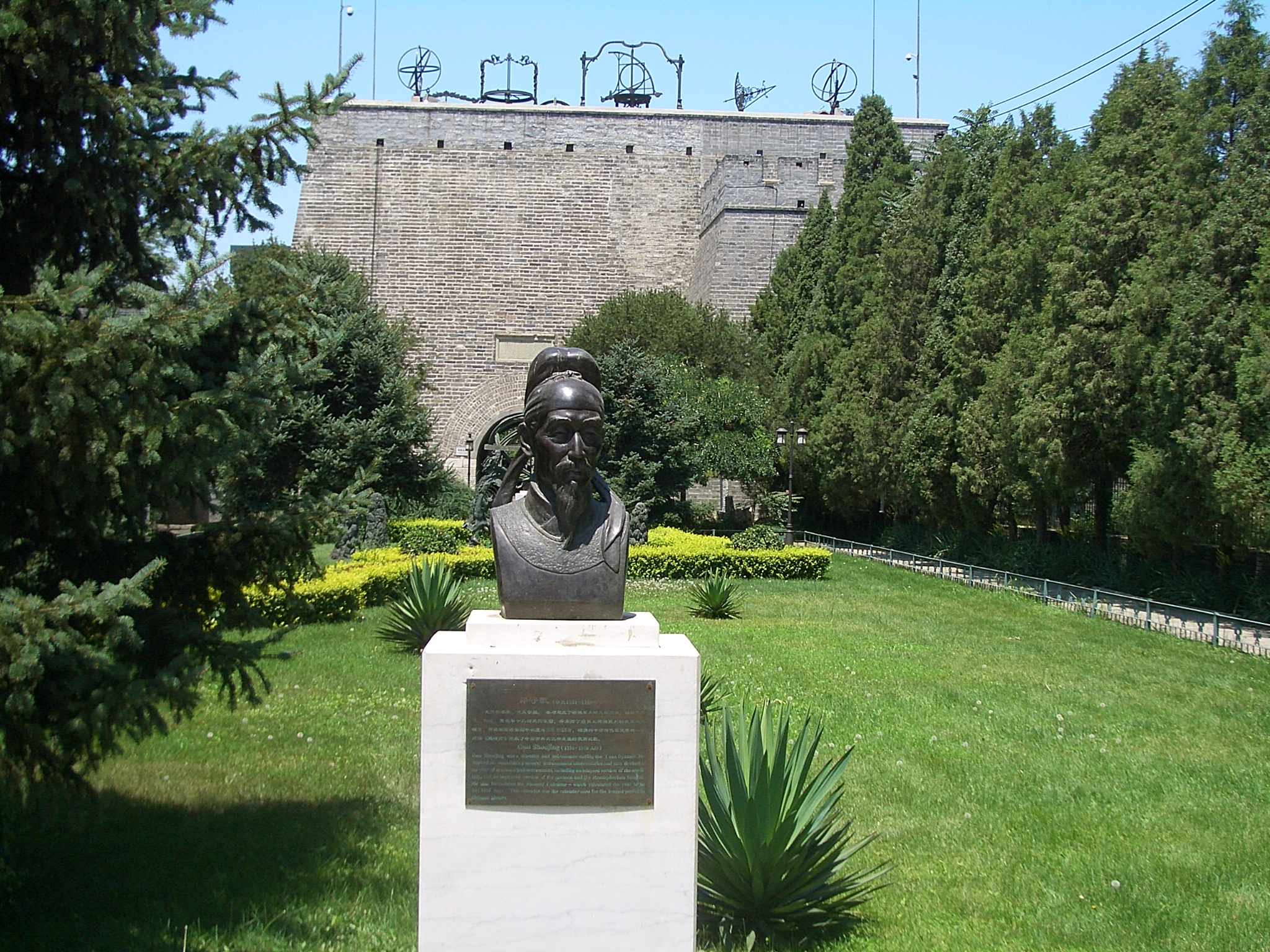
- On the grounds of the Beijing Ancient Observatory with a bronze bust of the astronomer and mathematician Guo Shoujing in the foreground.
- Location: Jianguomen Subdistrict, Dongcheng, Beijing, PRC
- Coordinates: 39°54′22″N 116°25′41″E
- Website: www.bjp.org.cn/misc/node_4542.htm
- Related media on Commons

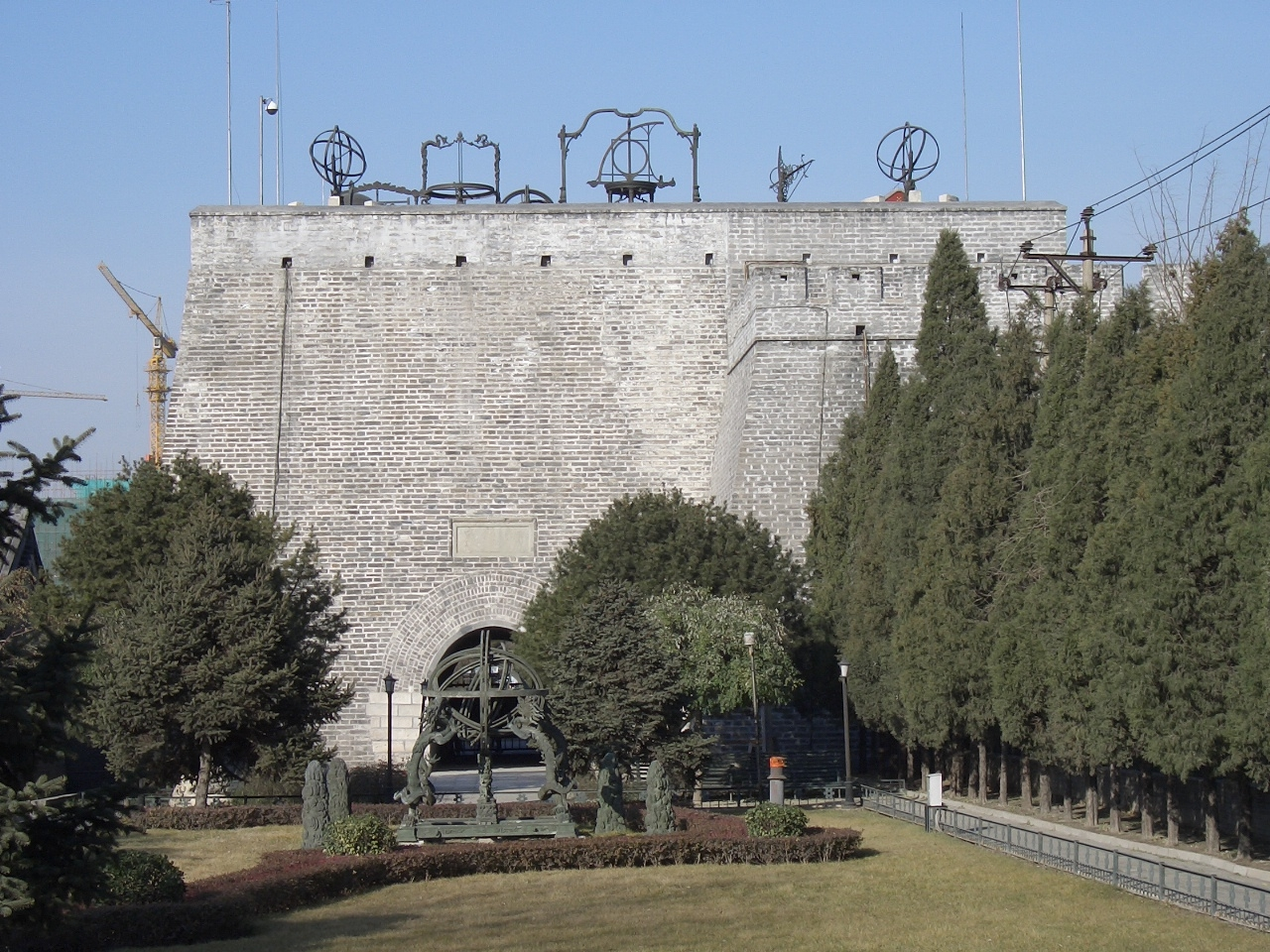
The back of the Beijing Ancient Observatory. Instruments seen from left to right are: the ecliptic armilla, altazimuth, azimuth theodolite, sextant, and equatorial armilla.

The Beijing Ancient Observatory (traditional Chinese: 北京古觀象臺; simplified Chinese: 北京古观象台; pinyin: Běijīng Gǔ Guānxiàngtái) is a pretelescopic observatory located in Beijing, China. The observatory was built in 1442 during the Ming dynasty, and expanded during the Qing. It received major reorganization and many new, more accurate instruments from Europeans (Jesuits) in 1644.

As one of the oldest observatories in the world, the Beijing Ancient Observatory grounds cover an area of 10,000 square meters. The observatory itself is located on a 40 by 40 metres (130 ft × 130 ft) wide platform on the top of a 15 m (49 ft) tall brick tower, an extant portion of the old Ming dynasty era city wall that once encircled Beijing. Several of the bronze astronomical instruments are on the platform, and other armillary spheres, sundials, and other instruments are located nearby at ground level. It is operated as a museum in affiliation with the Beijing Planetarium.

== History ==
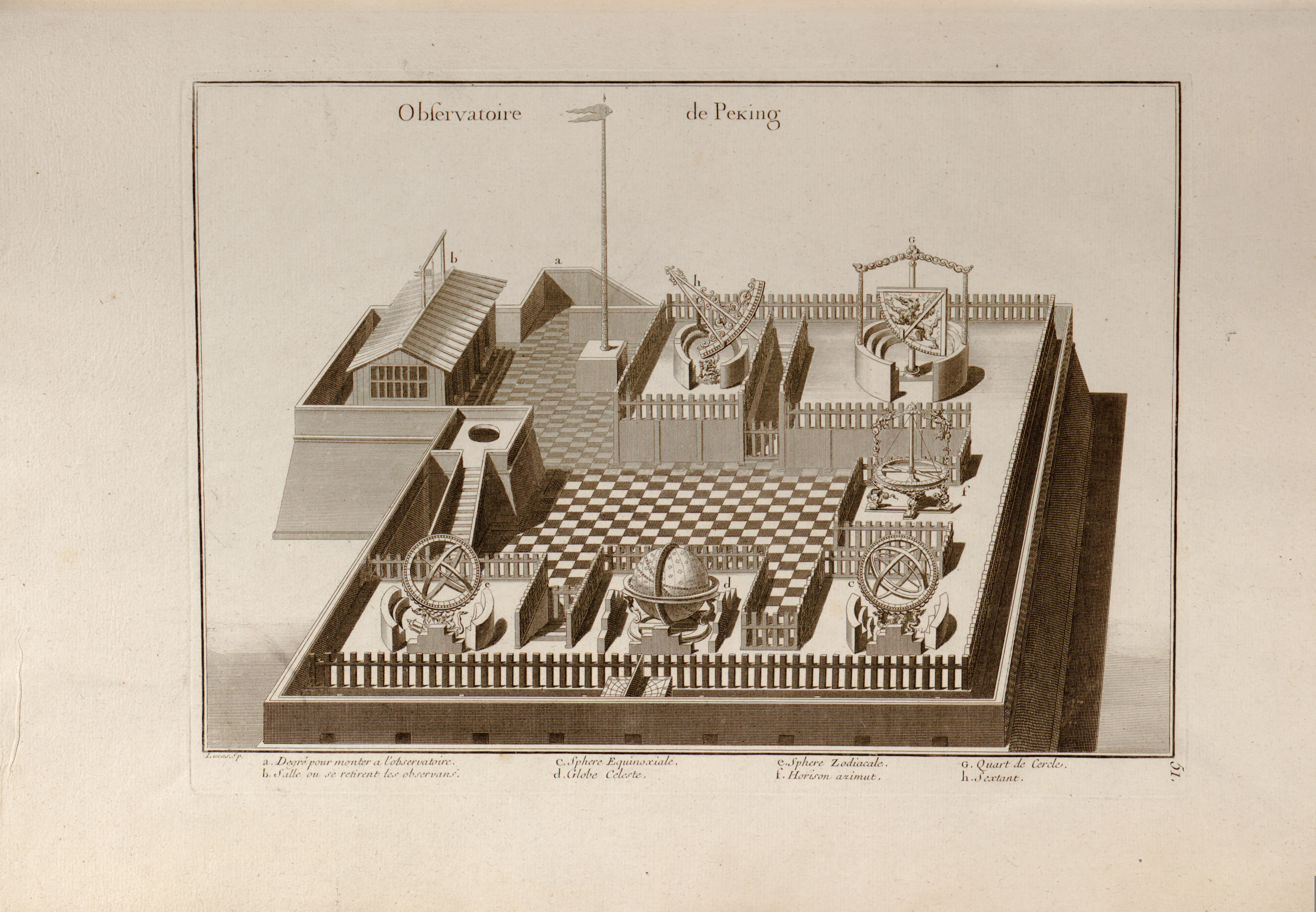
An image of the observatory after reorganization by the Jesuits

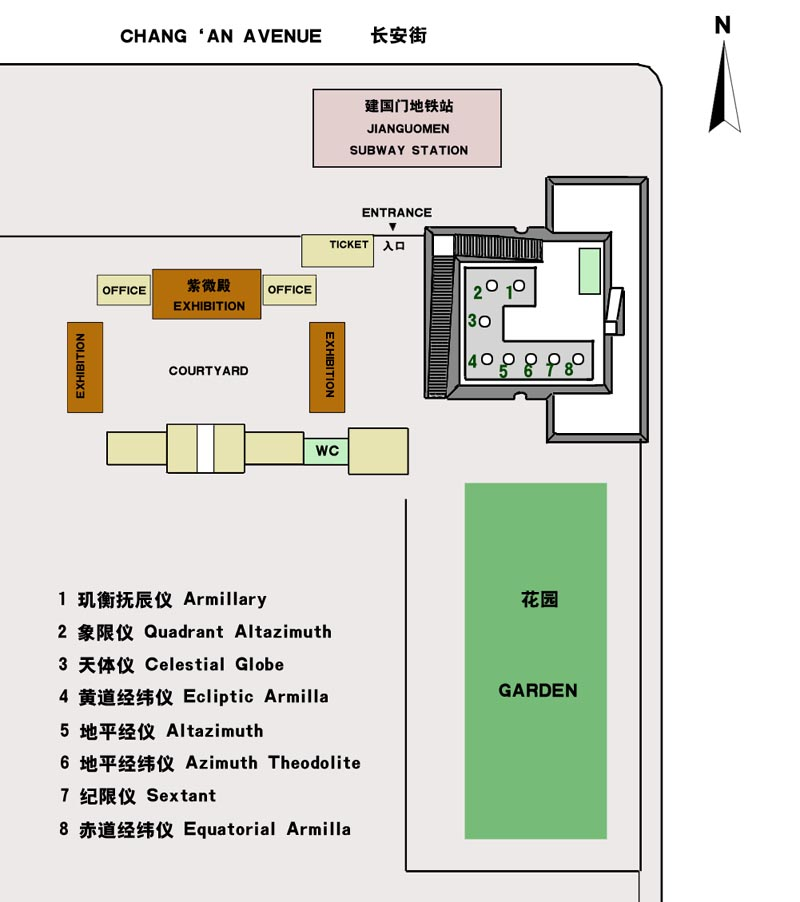
The layout of the observatory

It was said that in 1227, the Jin dynasty transferred the ancient astronomical instruments from Kaifeng to the first observatory in Beijing.

=== Yuan dynasty ===
In 1279, the succeeding Mongols under Kublai Khan built a new observatory just north of the current observatory. Kublai Khan made his chief adviser of hydraulics, mathematics and astronomy, Guo Shoujing, director of the observatory in 1283 after the death of Guo's friend and predecessor Zhang Wenqian. After the Mongols, Zhu Yuanzhang, the founding Ming Emperor, transferred the instruments from Beijing to Nanjing. When the Yongle Emperor came to power, he had craftsmen make copies of the instruments in Nanjing and sent them to the Beijing observatory.

=== Ming and Qing dynasties ===
The current observatory was completed in 1442. It assisted the Ming and Qing astronomers in their observation reports for the Emperor. As he was considered the "Son of Heaven", the movements of the heavenly bodies were an important affair. Another function was to assist sea navigation, with Muslim scholars recruited for their expertise in the area. In the mid-17th century, after winning an astronomy contest, the Jesuit Ferdinand Verbiest was awarded complete charge of the astronomy observatory by the emperor. In 1673, he supervised the rebuilding of some of the instruments. He and other Jesuits helped to further develop the observations of the stars and the planets.

During the later stages of the Qing dynasty, members of the Eight-Nation Alliance looted some of the instruments. The instruments were returned to China by the French government in 1902 and the German government in 1921. An early seismograph of Zhang Heng's design used to be housed at the observatory. Some of the instruments from the Ming era are now at Purple Mountain Observatory in Nanjing.

== Access and nearby attractions ==
The Beijing Ancient Observatory is located just south of Jianguomen in Dongcheng District and can be accessed by Lines 1 and 2 of the Beijing Subway to Jianguomen station (Exit C) and bus routes 25, 39, 43, 44, 52, 122, 434, 637, 638, 750 and 特2 to Jianguomen South (建国门桥南). The Beijing railway station and the Ming City Wall Relics Park are a short walk to the south.

== See also ==
- Chinese astronomy
- History of Beijing
- Ferdinand Augustin Hallerstein, creator of some of the instruments
- Ignaz Kögler, creator of some of the instruments
- Ferdinand Verbiest, creator of some of the instruments
- List of astronomical observatories
- List of Jesuit sites
