= Dongsi station =

Beijing Subway interchange station

Dongsi 东四
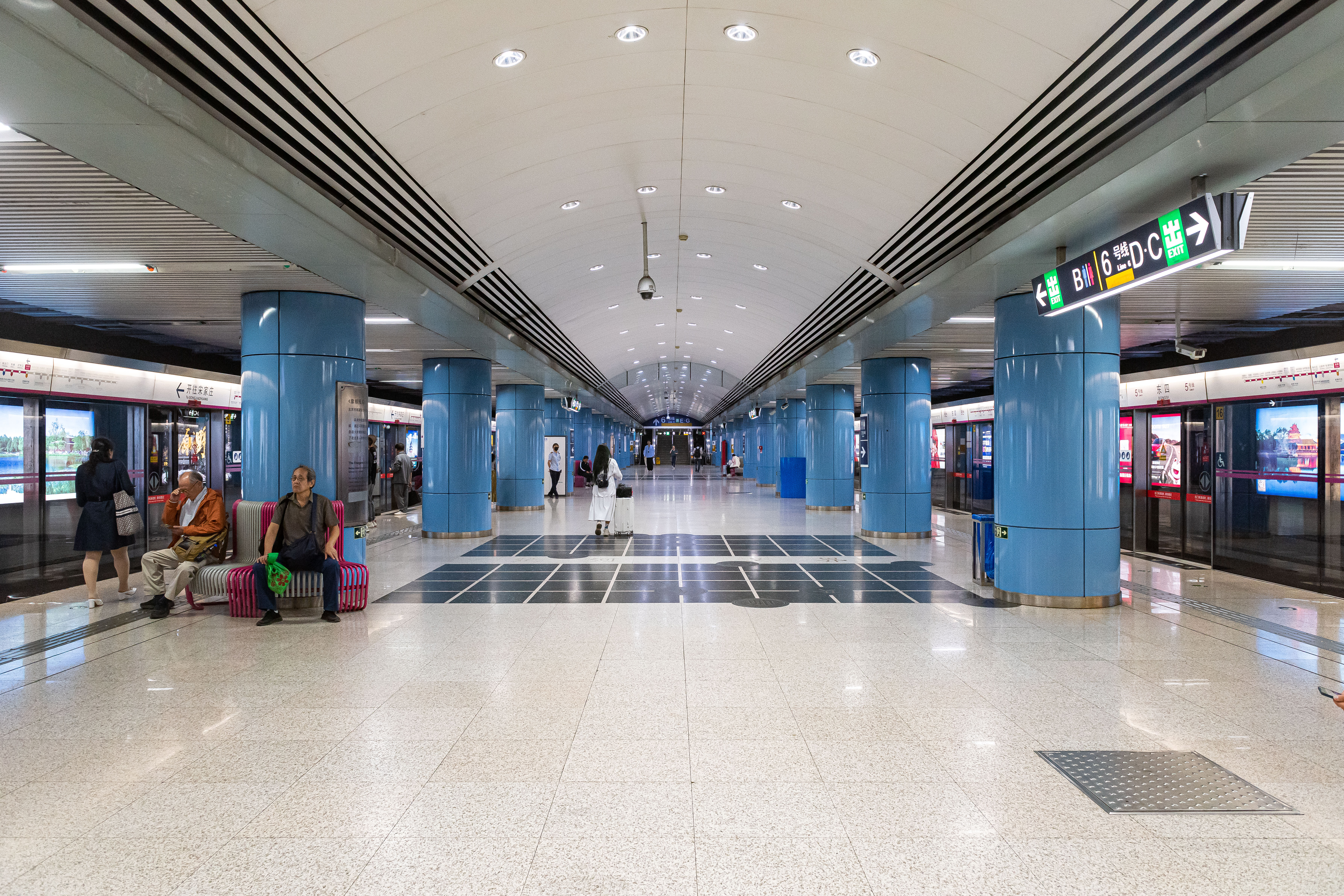
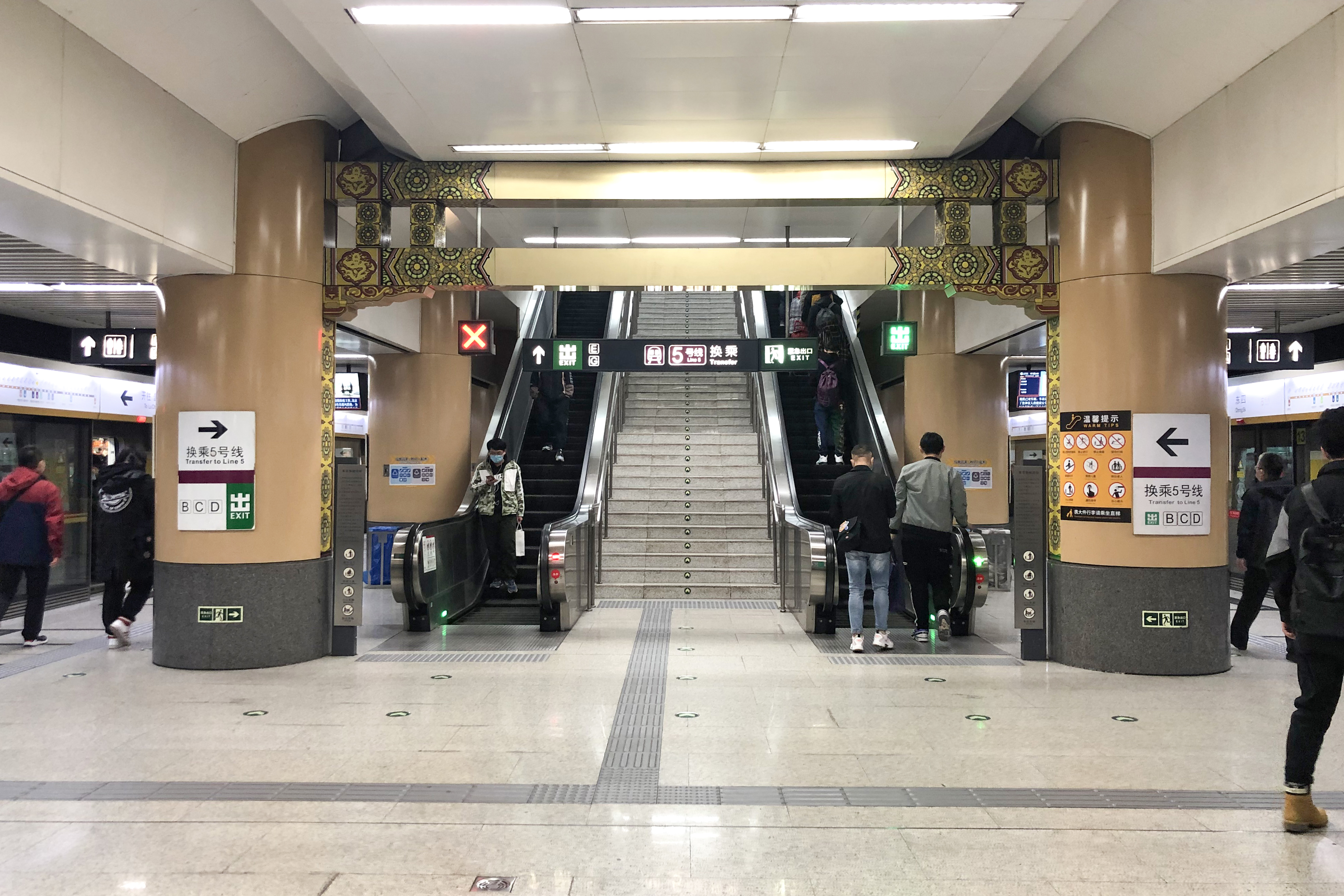
- Line 5 platform Line 6 platform

General information
- Location: Dongsi West Street / Chaoyangmen Inner Street and Dongsi North Street / Dongsi South Street; Dongsi Subdistrict, Dongcheng District, Beijing; China
- Coordinates: 39°55′28″N 116°25′03″E
- Operator: Beijing Mass Transit Railway Operation Corporation Limited
- Lines: Line 5; Line 6
- Platforms: 4 (2 island platforms)
- Tracks: 4

Construction
- Structure type: Underground
- Accessible: Yes

History
- Opened: October 7, 2007; 18 years ago (Line 5); December 30, 2012; 13 years ago (Line 6)

Services
Preceding station	Beijing Subway	Following station
Zhangzizhong Lu towards Tiantongyuanbei	Line 5	Dengshi Kou towards Songjiazhuang
Nanluogu Xiang towards Jin'anqiao	Line 6	Chaoyang Men towards Luyang
Location
- Location within Beijing

Dongsi Station (simplified Chinese: 东四站; traditional Chinese: 東四站; pinyin: Dōngsì Zhàn) is an interchange station on Line 5 and Line 6 of the Beijing Subway at Dongsi Subdistrict.

== Around the station ==
- Dongsi Mosque

== Station layout ==
Both the line 5 and 6 stations have underground island platforms.

== Exits ==
There are 5 exits, lettered B, C, D, E, and G. Exit C is accessible.

== Gallery ==
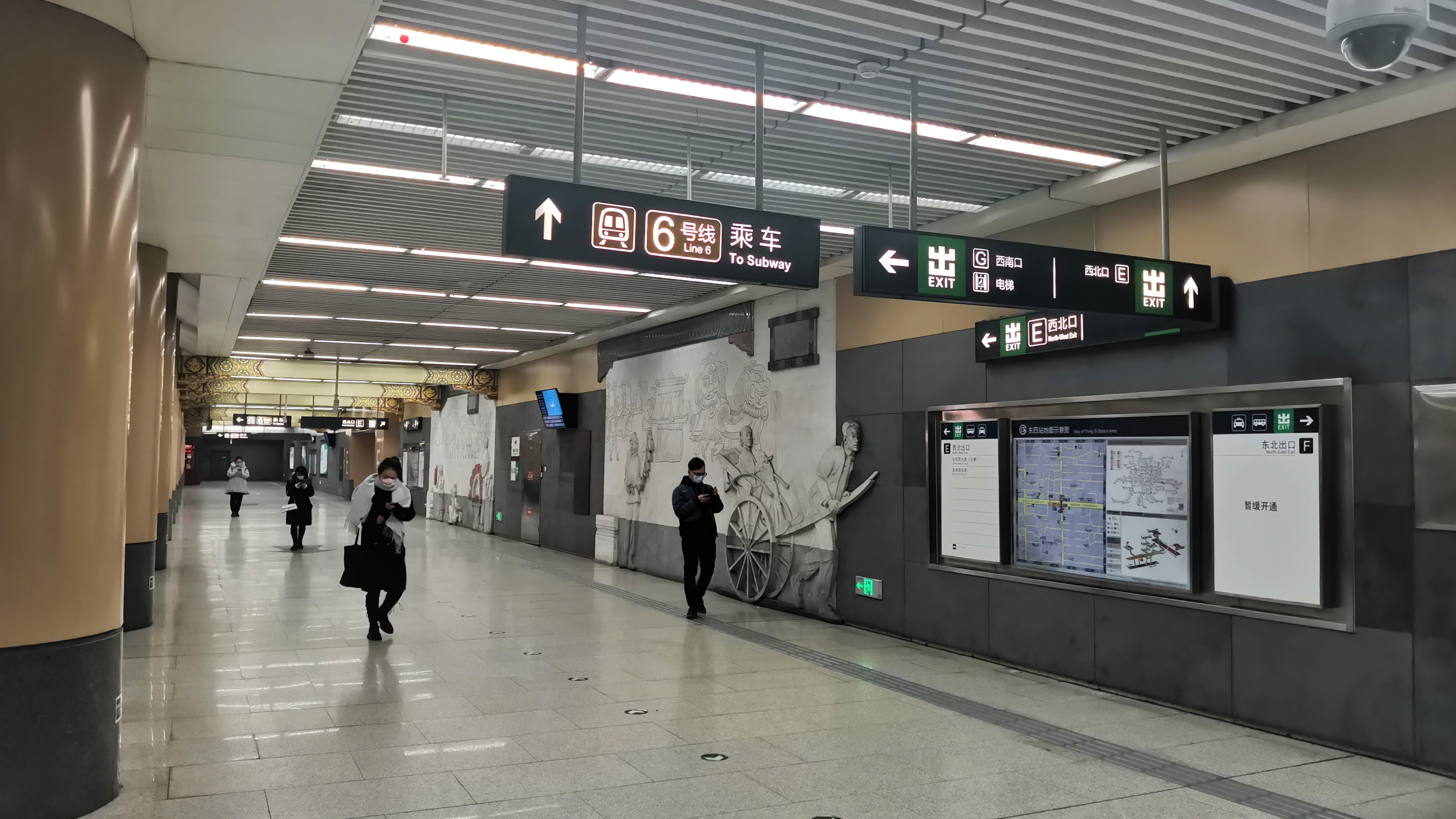
Line 6 concourse

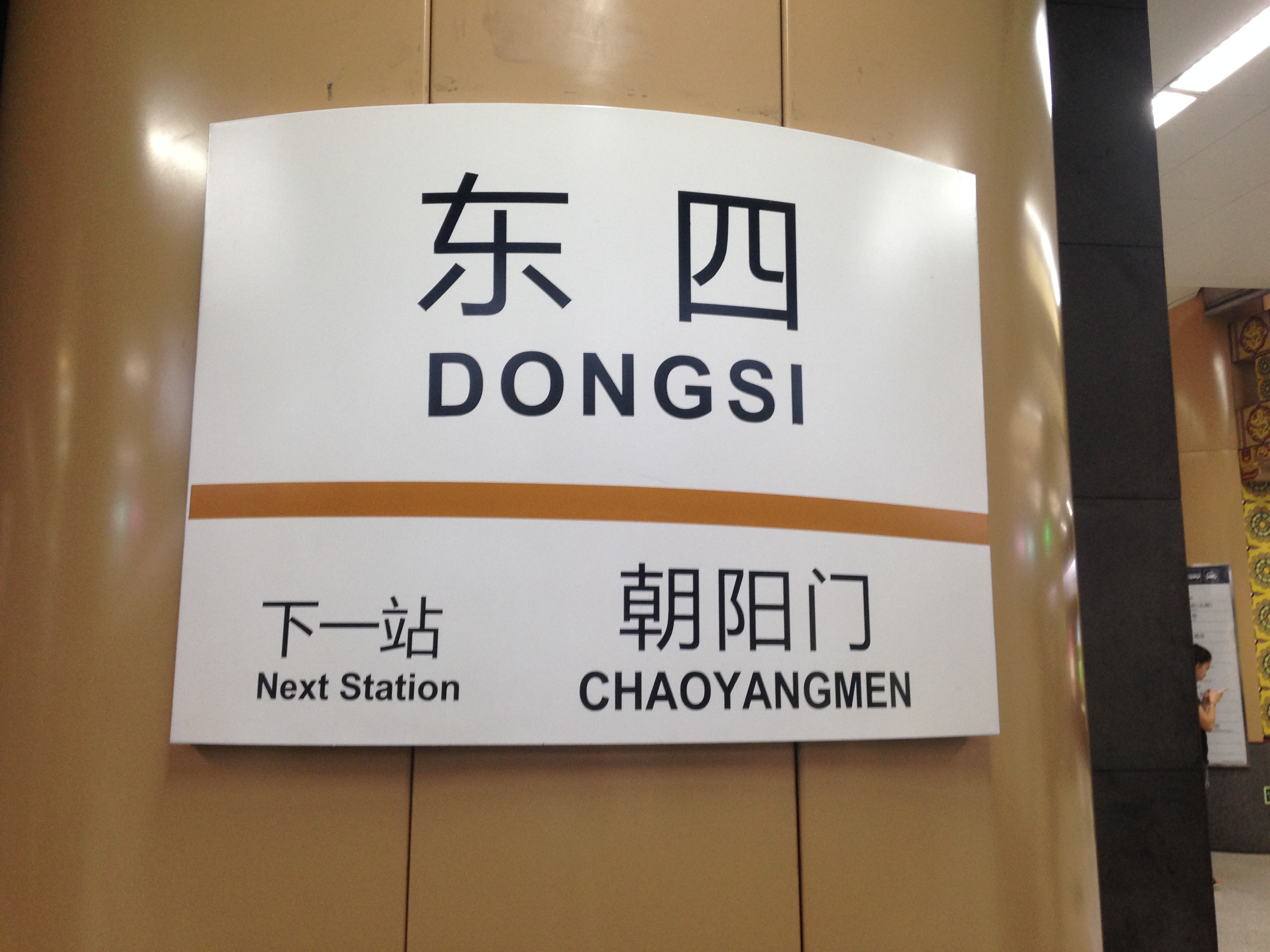
Line 6 sign

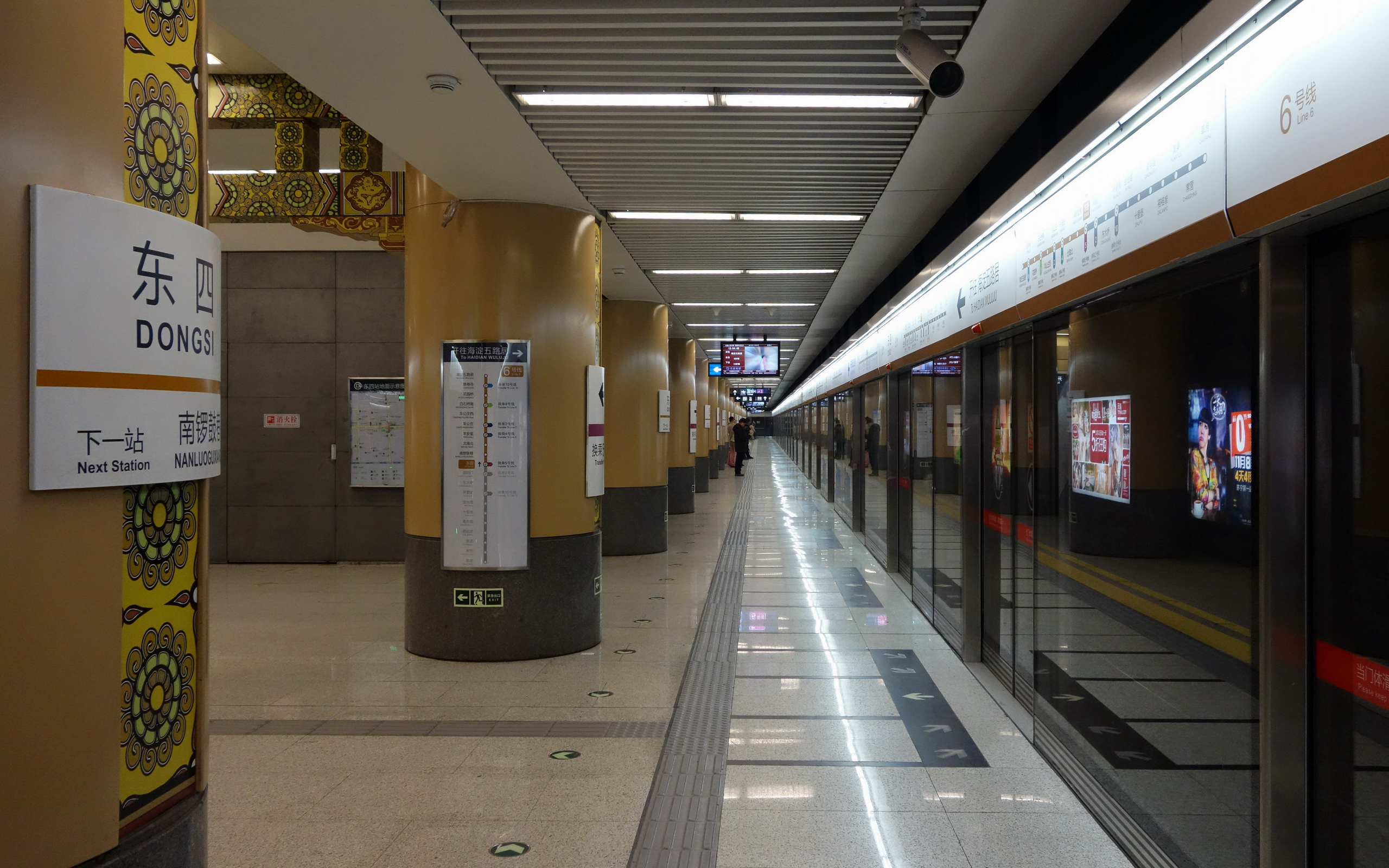
Line 6 platform (November 2013)
