= Jianguo Road =

Jianguo Road may refer to:

- Jianguo Road (Beijing), in the People's Republic of China (China)
- Jianguo Road (Taipei), in Taiwan (Republic of China)
- Jianguo Road (Xi'an), near Jianguomen (Xi'an), China

== See also ==
- Jianguomen Inner Street, Beijing
- Jianguomen Outer Street, Beijing
- Jianguomen (disambiguation)
