= Zhangzizhong Lu station =

Beijing Subway station

Zhangzizhong Lu 张自忠路
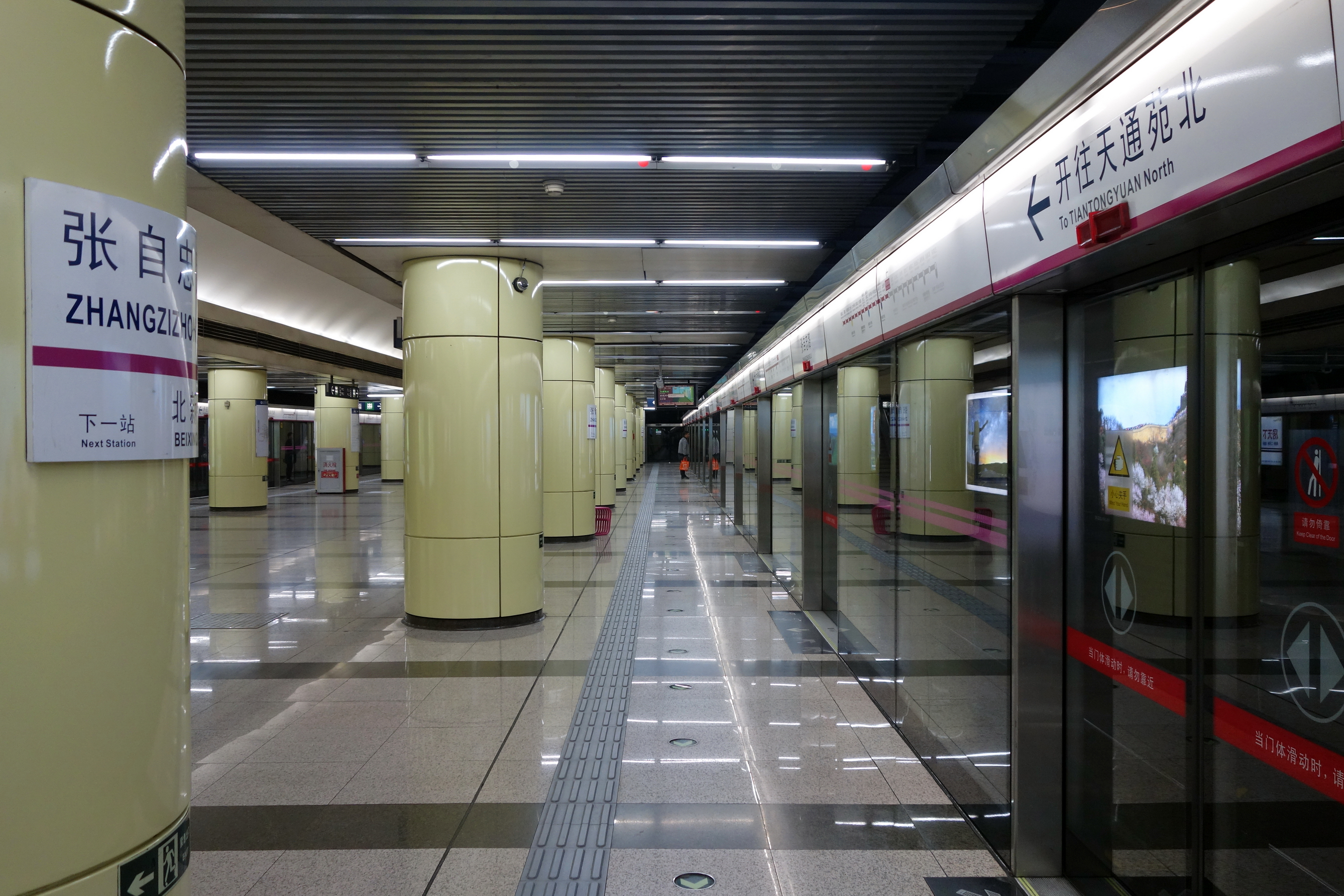
- Platform

General information
- Location: Dongsi North Street (东四北大街) and Zhang Zizhong Road / Dongsi Shitiao; Dongcheng District, Beijing; China
- Coordinates: 39.9337°N 116.4172°E
- Operator: Beijing Mass Transit Railway Operation Corporation Limited
- Line: Line 5
- Platforms: 2 (1 island platform)
- Tracks: 2

Construction
- Structure type: Underground
- Accessible: Yes

History
- Opened: October 7, 2007; 18 years ago

Services
Preceding station	Beijing Subway	Following station
Beixinqiao towards Tiantongyuanbei	Line 5	Dongsi towards Songjiazhuang
Location
- Location within Beijing

Zhangzizhong Lu Station (simplified Chinese: 张自忠路站; traditional Chinese: 張自忠路站; pinyin: Zhāngzìzhōng Lù Zhàn) is a station on Line 5 of the Beijing Subway. Zhangzizhonglu, literally meaning Zhang Zizhong Road, is named after general Zhang Zizhong, who died in the Second Sino-Japanese War. It will become a transfer station for Line 3 in the future.

== Station layout ==
The station has an underground island platform.

== Exits ==
There are four exits, lettered A, B, C, and D. Exit D is accessible.
