= Dengshikou station =

Beijing Subway station

Dengshi Kou 灯市口
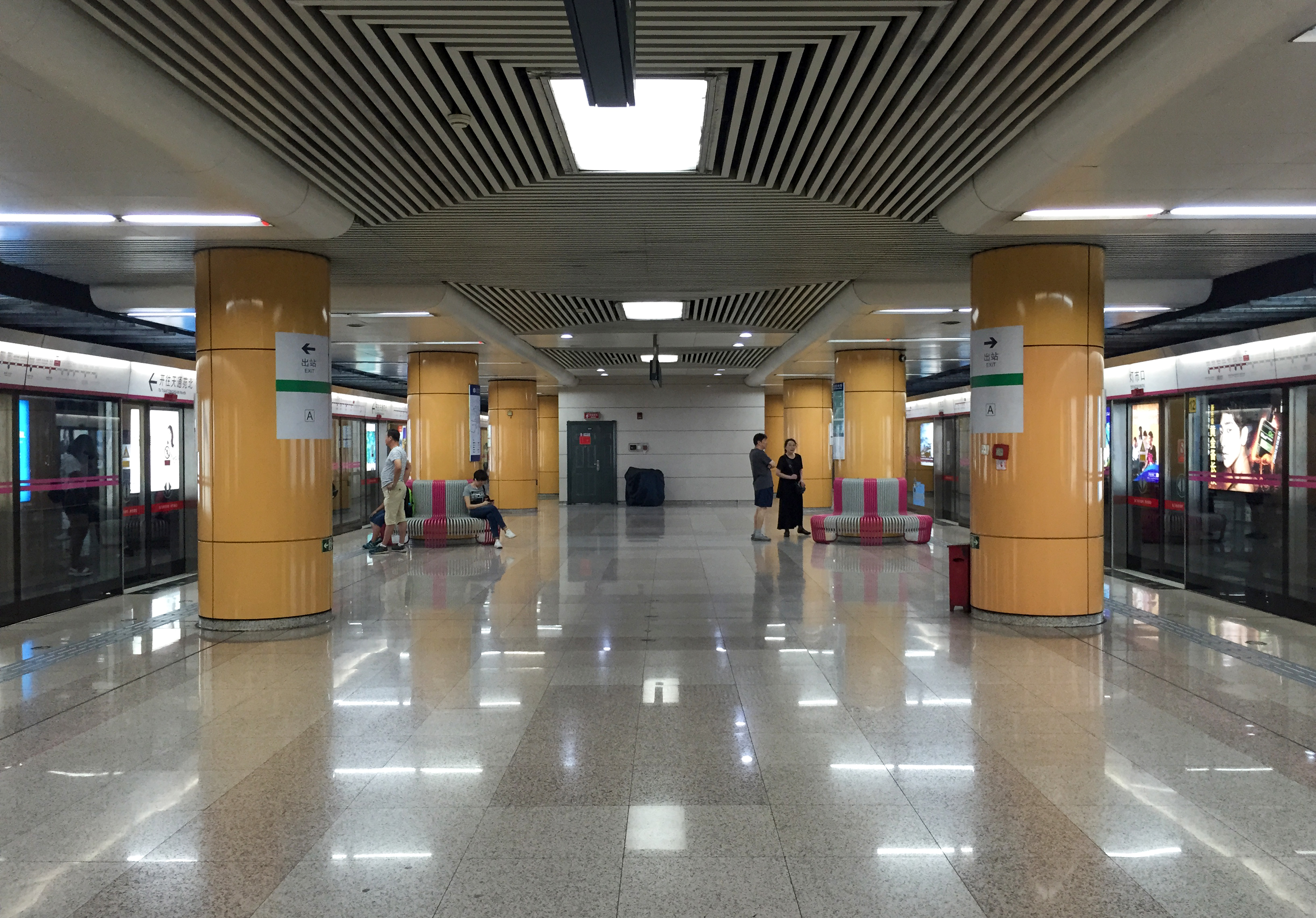
- Platform

General information
- Location: Dongsi South Street and Jinyu Hutong; Dongcheng District, Beijing; China
- Coordinates: 39.9171°N 116.4178°E
- Operator: Beijing Mass Transit Railway Operation Corporation Limited
- Line: Line 5
- Platforms: 2 (1 island platform)
- Tracks: 2

Construction
- Structure type: Underground
- Accessible: Yes

History
- Opened: October 7, 2007; 18 years ago

Services
Preceding station	Beijing Subway	Following station
Dongsi towards Tiantongyuanbei	Line 5	Dongdan towards Songjiazhuang
Location
- Location within Beijing

Dengshi Kou station (Chinese: 灯市口站; pinyin: Dēngshì Kǒu Zhàn) is a station on Line 5 of the Beijing Subway.

== Station layout ==
The station has an underground island platform.

== Exits ==
There are two exits, lettered A and C. Exit C is accessible.

== Gallery ==
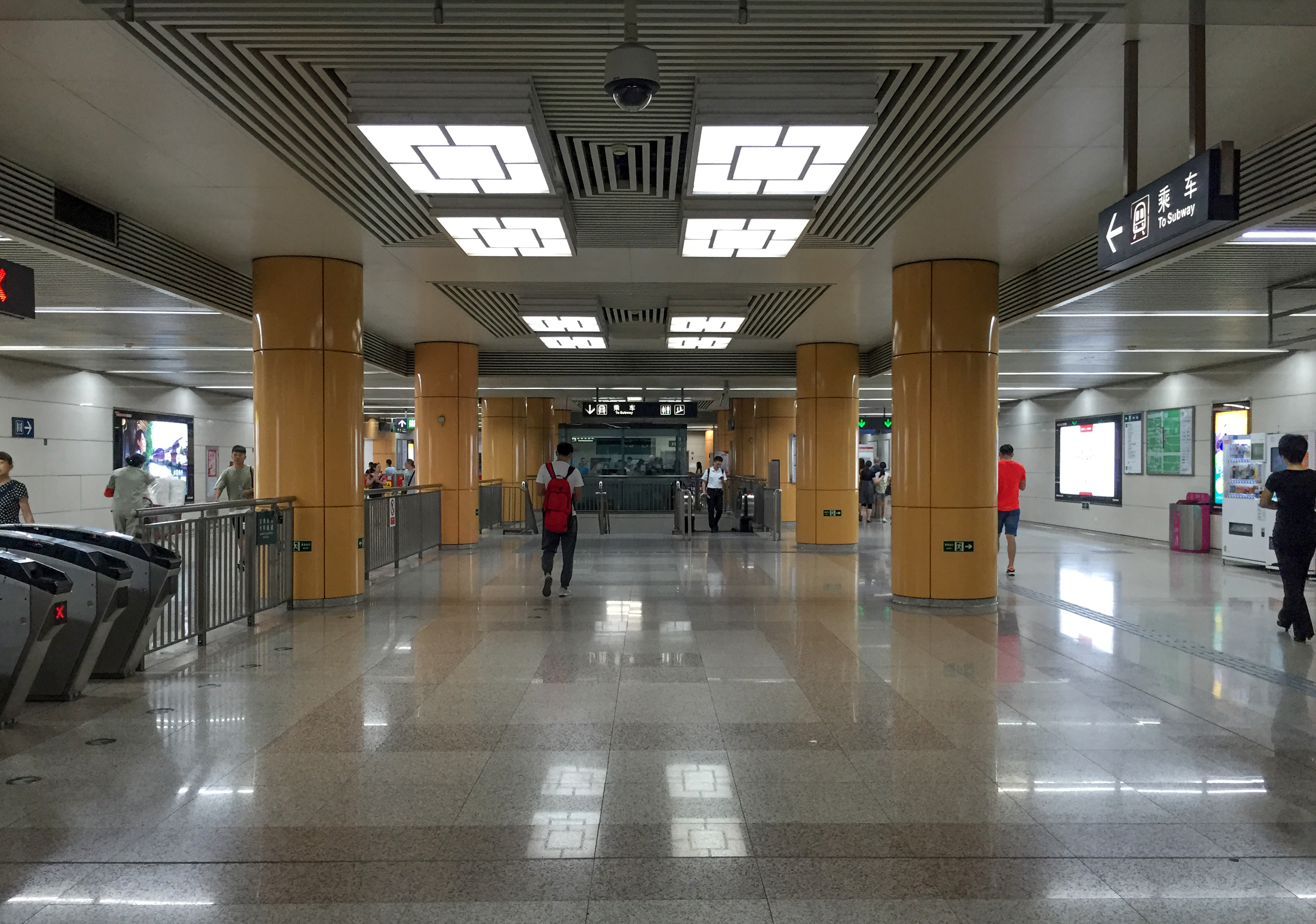
Concourse of Dengshikou Station

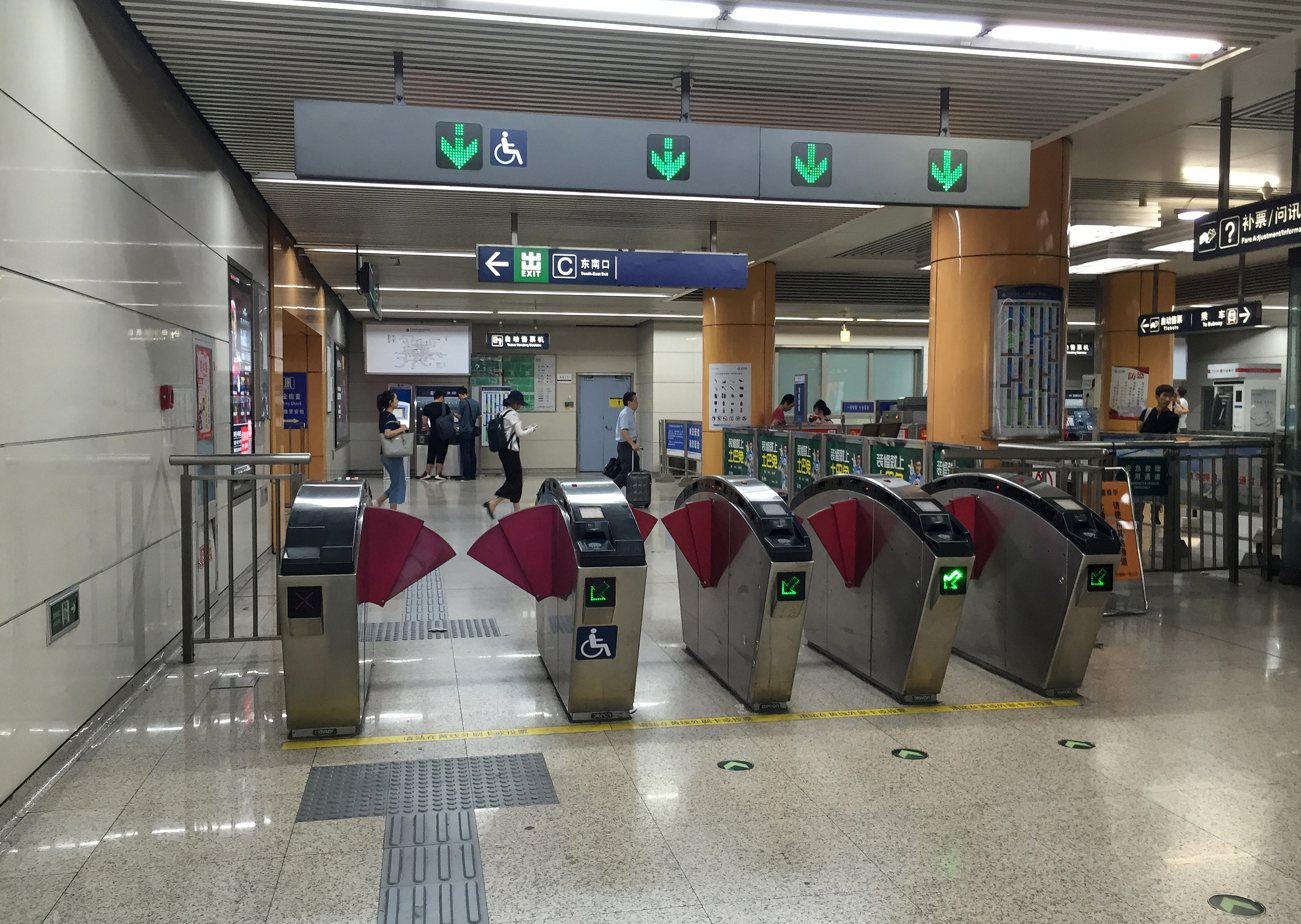
Exit faregates
