= Chaoyangmen station (Beijing Subway) =

Beijing subway interchange station

Chaoyang Men 朝阳门
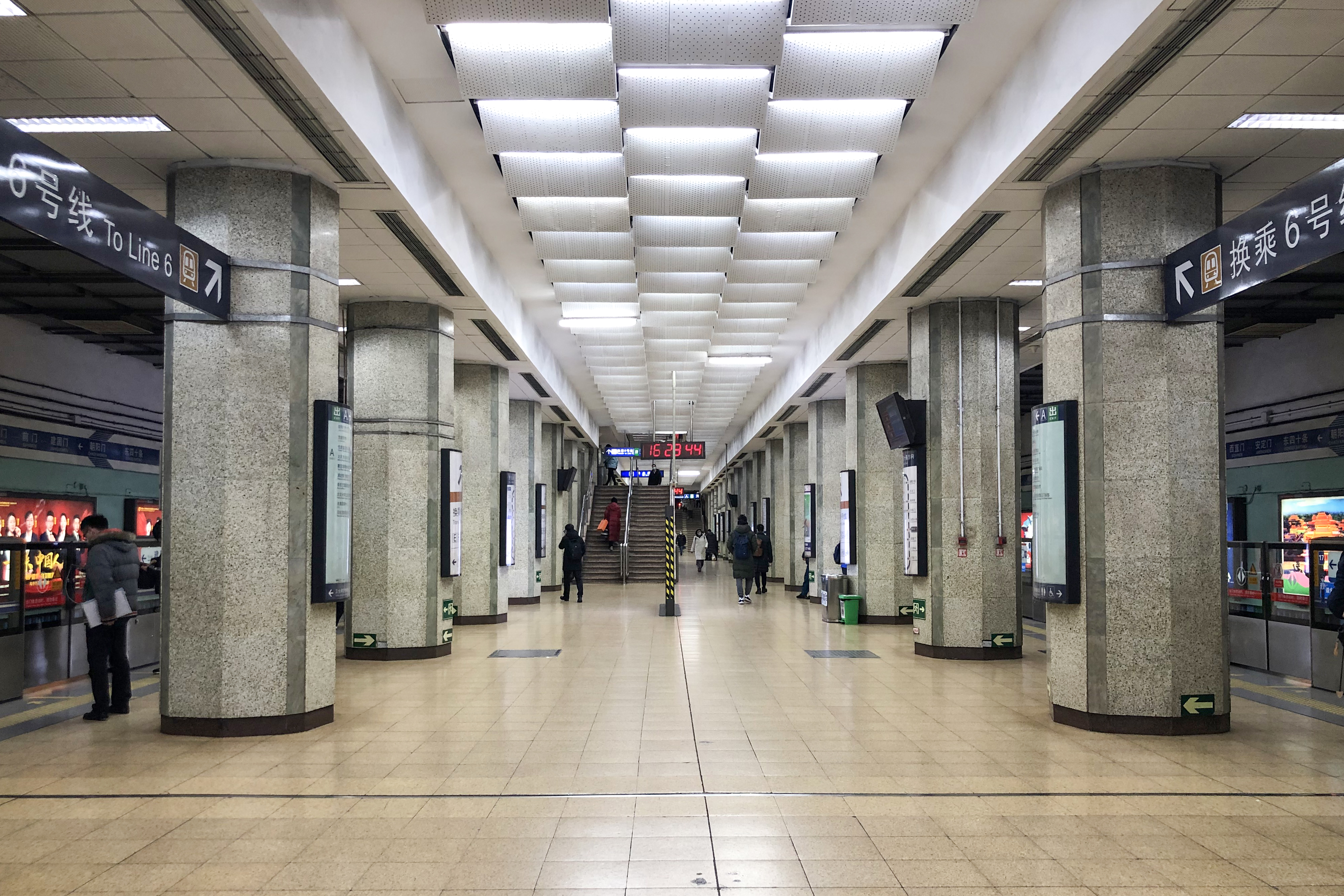
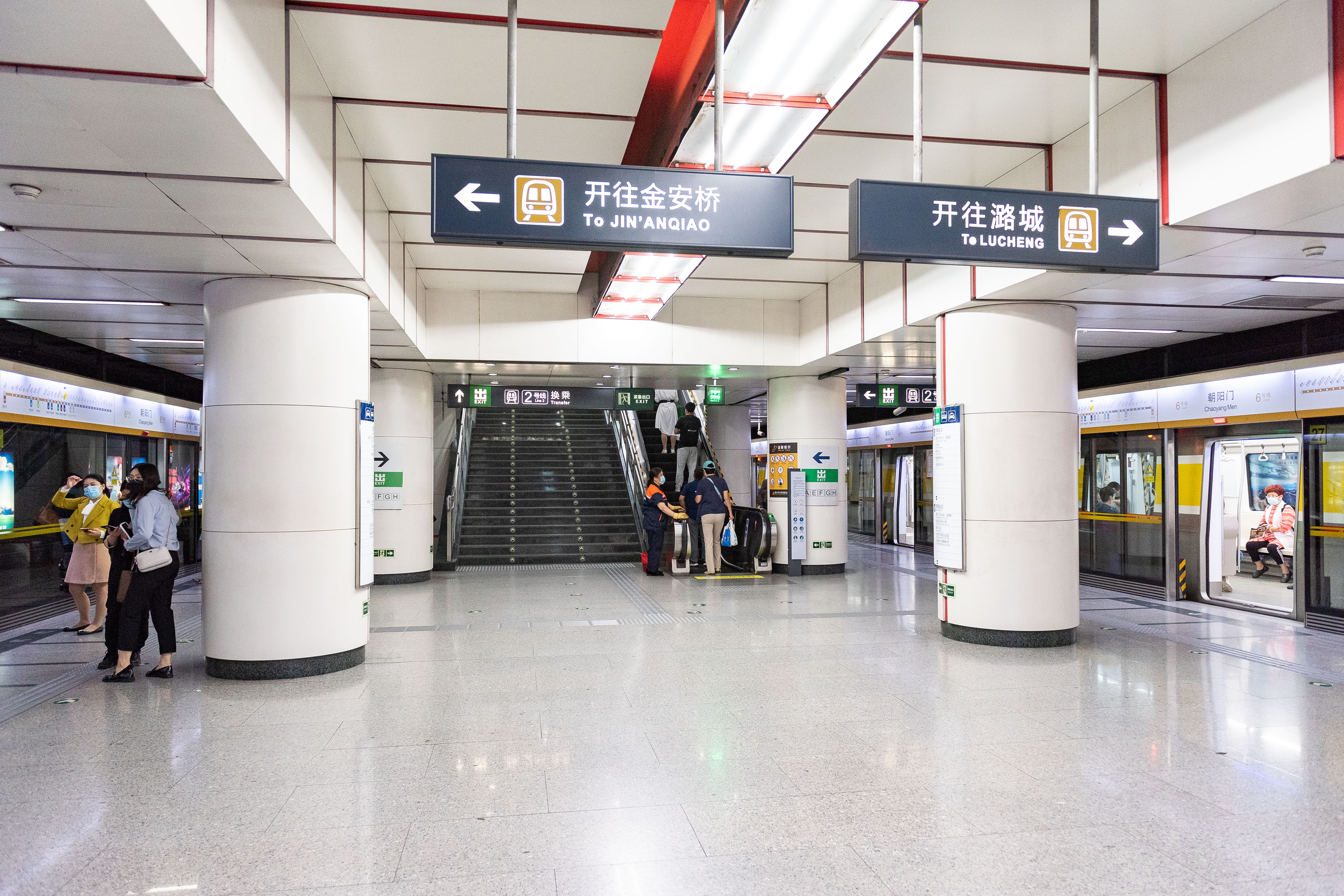
- Line 2 platform Line 6 platform

General information
- Location: Chaoyangmen (East 2nd Ring Road and Chaoyangmen Inner Street / Chaoyang Outer Street); Dongcheng District / Chaoyang District border, Beijing; China
- Coordinates: 39.9241°N 116.4329°E
- Operator: Beijing Mass Transit Railway Operation Corporation Limited
- Lines: Line 2; Line 6
- Platforms: 4 (2 island platforms)
- Tracks: 4

Construction
- Structure type: Underground
- Accessible: Yes

Other information
- Station code: 212 (line 2)

History
- Opened: September 20, 1984; 41 years ago (Line 2); December 30, 2012; 13 years ago (Line 6)

Services
Preceding station	Beijing Subway	Following station
Dongsi Shitiao outer loop / anticlockwise	Line 2	Jianguomen inner loop / clockwise
Dongsi towards Jin'anqiao	Line 6	Dongdaqiao towards Luyang
Location
- Location within Beijing

Chaoyang Men Station (simplified Chinese: 朝阳门站; traditional Chinese: 朝陽門站; pinyin: Cháoyáng Mén Zhàn) is an interchange station on Line 2 and Line 6 of the Beijing Subway named for Chaoyangmen, an old gate in Beijing's city wall.

== Station layout ==
Both the line 2 and 6 stations have underground island platforms.

== Exits ==
There are 5 exits, lettered A, E, F, G, and H. Exits A and H are accessible.

== Gallery ==
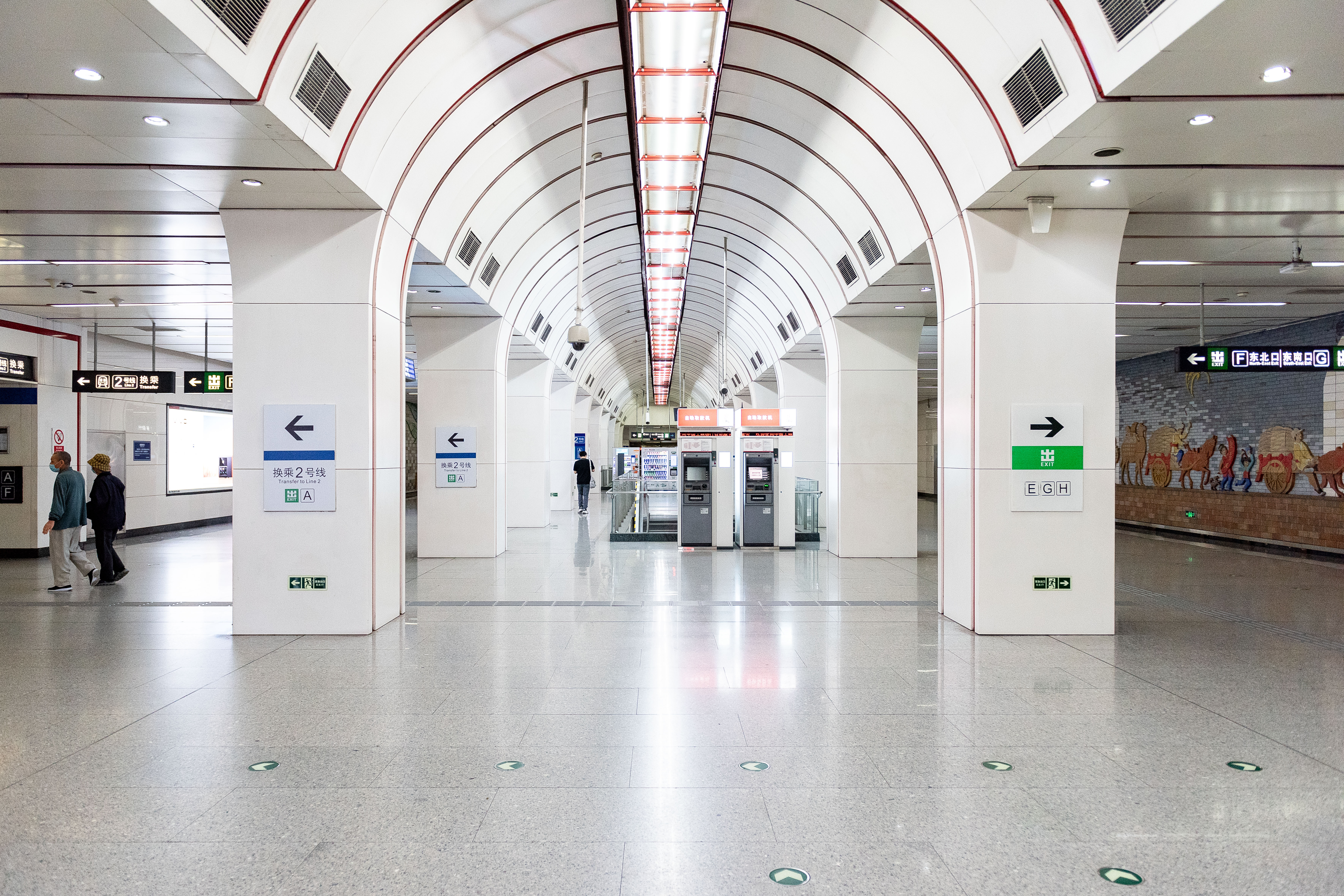
Line 6 concourse

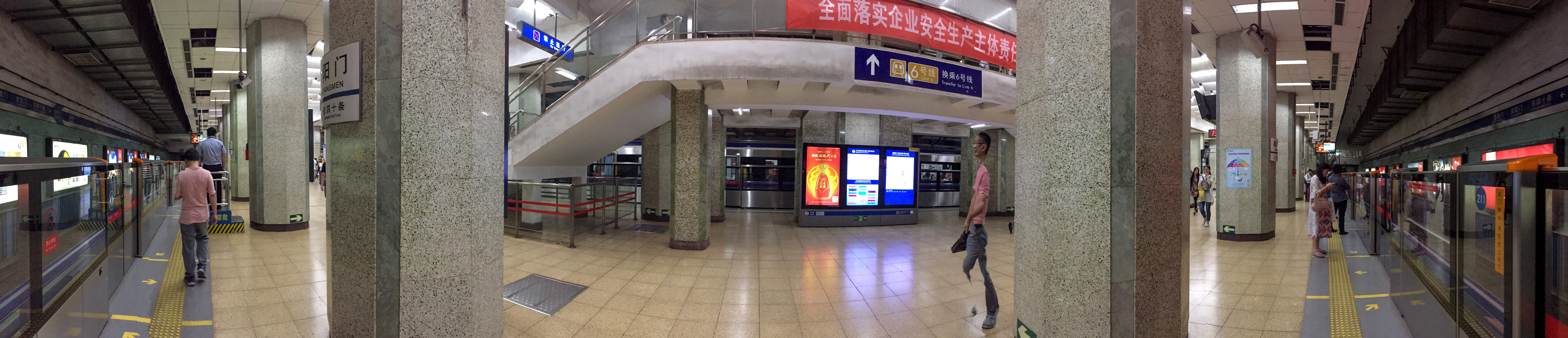
Platform of Line 2 panorama

== Around the station ==
- Nandouya Mosque
