= Nandouya Mosque =

Mosque in Dongcheng, Beijing, China

- 南豆芽清真寺
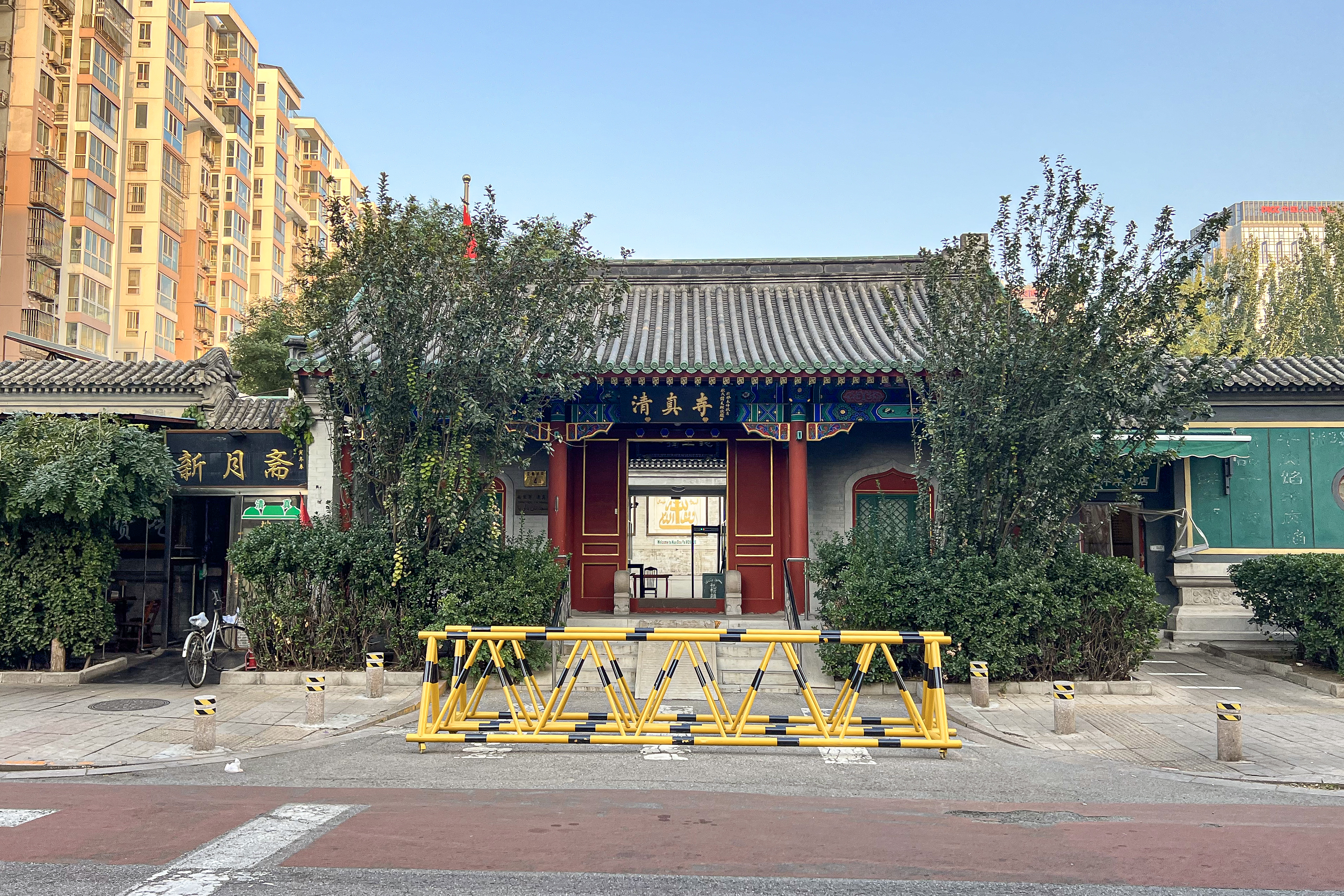

- Location of the mosque in Beijing

Religion
- Affiliation: Sunni Islam
- Ecclesiastical or organizational status: Mosque
- Status: Active

Location
- Location: Dongcheng, Beijing
- Country: China
- Interactive map of Nandouya Mosque
- Coordinates: 39°55′41″N 116°25′57″E

Architecture
- Type: Mosque
- Style: Chinese
- Completed: 1879

Specifications
- Capacity: 200 worshippers
- Site area: 1,600 m^{2} (17,000 sq ft)

The Nandouya Mosque (Chinese: 南豆芽清真寺; pinyin: Nándòuyá Qīngzhēnsì) is a mosque in Dongcheng District, Beijing, China.

== History ==
The mosque was constructed in 1879 during the Qing Dynasty. In 2003, the mosque was relocated to its current location which is approximately 100 metres (330 ft) from its original location due to the development of the city. The new mosque was constructed with a cost of CN¥8 million, collected from the Beijing City Government and donations from local Muslims.

== Architecture ==
The mosque has a capacity of 200 worshipers, located on a 1,600-square-metre (17,000 sq ft) site. It was built with orientation facing east and west with an Islamic lintel topped with a crescent moon. The mosque also has a meeting room. The front of the mosque is a sahn surrounded by corridors.

== Transportation ==
The mosque is accessible within walking distance north of Chaoyangmen Station of Beijing Subway.

== See also ==
- Islam in China
- List of mosques in China
