= Dongsi Mosque =

Mosque in Dongcheng, Beijing, China

- 东四清真寺
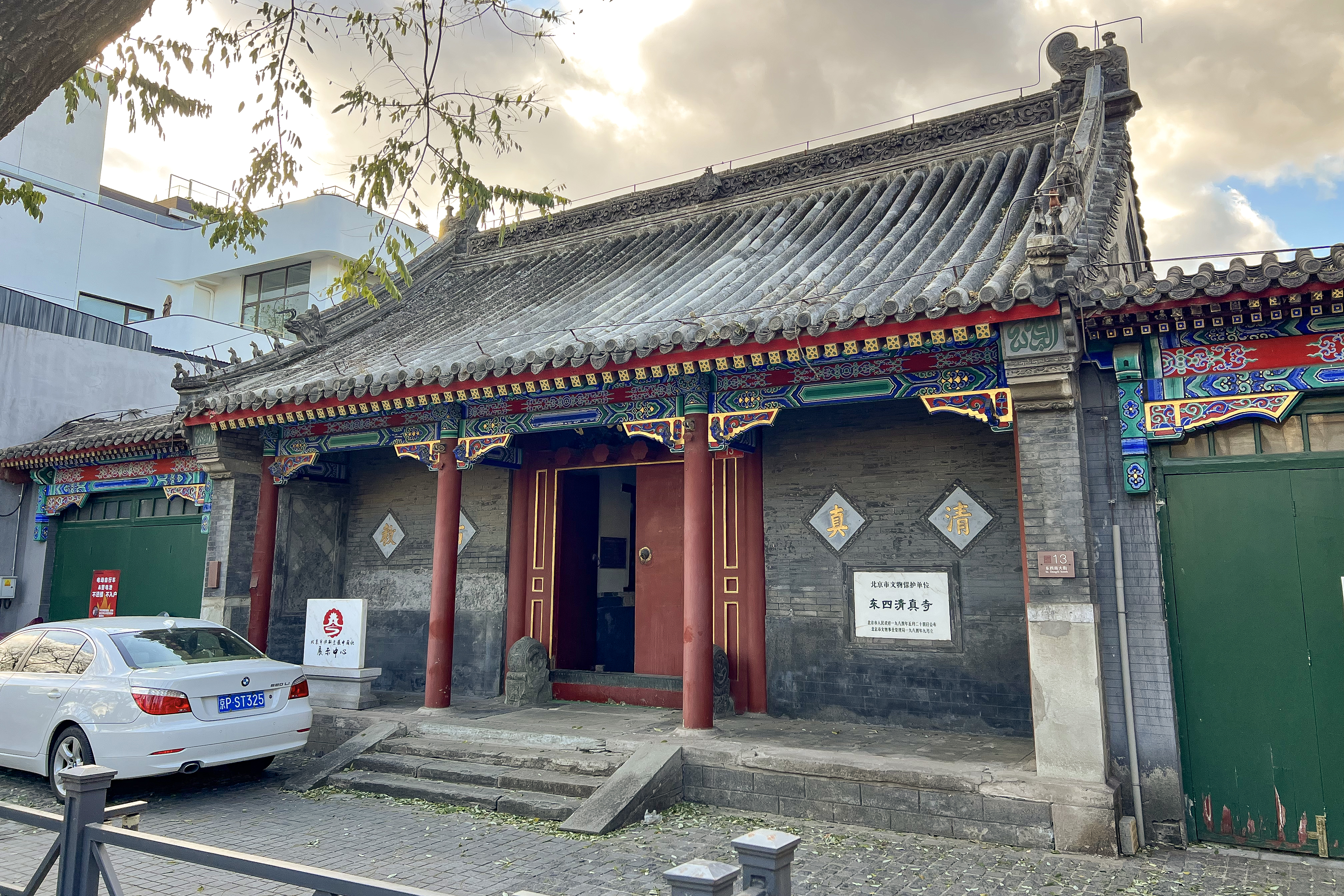

- Location of the mosque in Beijing

Religion
- Affiliation: Sunni Islam
- Ecclesiastical or organisational status: Mosque
- Status: Active

Location
- Location: No. 13, Dongsi South Street, Dongsi, Dongcheng, Beijing
- Country: China
- Interactive map of Dongsi Mosque
- Coordinates: 39°55′23.9″N 116°25′01.2″E

Architecture
- Type: Mosque
- Completed: c. 1346 CE

Specifications
- Capacity: 500 worshipers
- Minaret: 1

The Dongsi Mosque (simplified Chinese: 东四清真寺; traditional Chinese: 東四清真寺; pinyin: Dōngsì Qīngzhēnsì) is a mosque in Dongsi Subdistrict, Dongcheng District, Beijing, China.

== History ==
According to local legends, the mosque was built during the Liao dynasty when Beijing was one of the secondary capitals of the Liao. However, records suggest that the mosque was constructed in 1346 during the Yuan dynasty. The mosque underwent expansion and renovation in 1447 and again in 1486. The earlier repairs were financed by Chen Yuyuan, a prominent officer during the Ming dynasty. The mosque survived a fire in the late 19th century but suffered damage. Comprehensive repairs were done to the mosque throughout the 20th century.

== Architecture ==
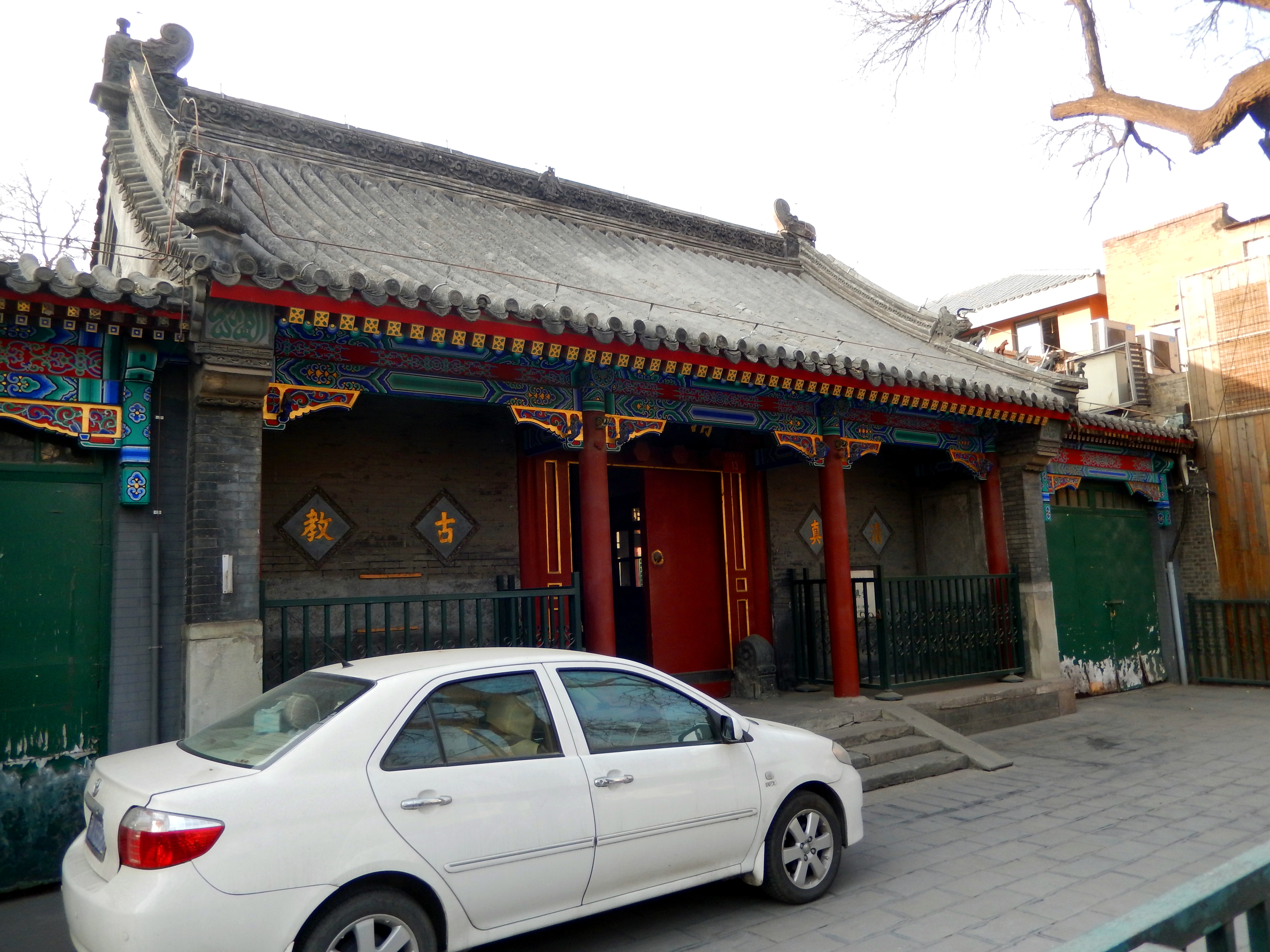
Dongsi Mosque

The mosque consists of two iwans, a minaret, a prayer hall and a library. The prayer hall has Koran carved on the arches of the hall and can accommodate up to 500 worshipers. On the southern part of the sahn there are five wing halls and on the northern part there are three wing halls. The architectural style of the mosque has features of Ming Dynasty. Located on the southern part of the courtyard, the library has various version of the Koran.

== Transportation ==
The mosque is accessible within walking distance south of Dongsi Station of Beijing Subway.

== See also ==
- Islam in China
- List of mosques in China
