= Jianguomen Subdistrict =

Jianguomen Subdistrict 建国门街道
- Subdistrict
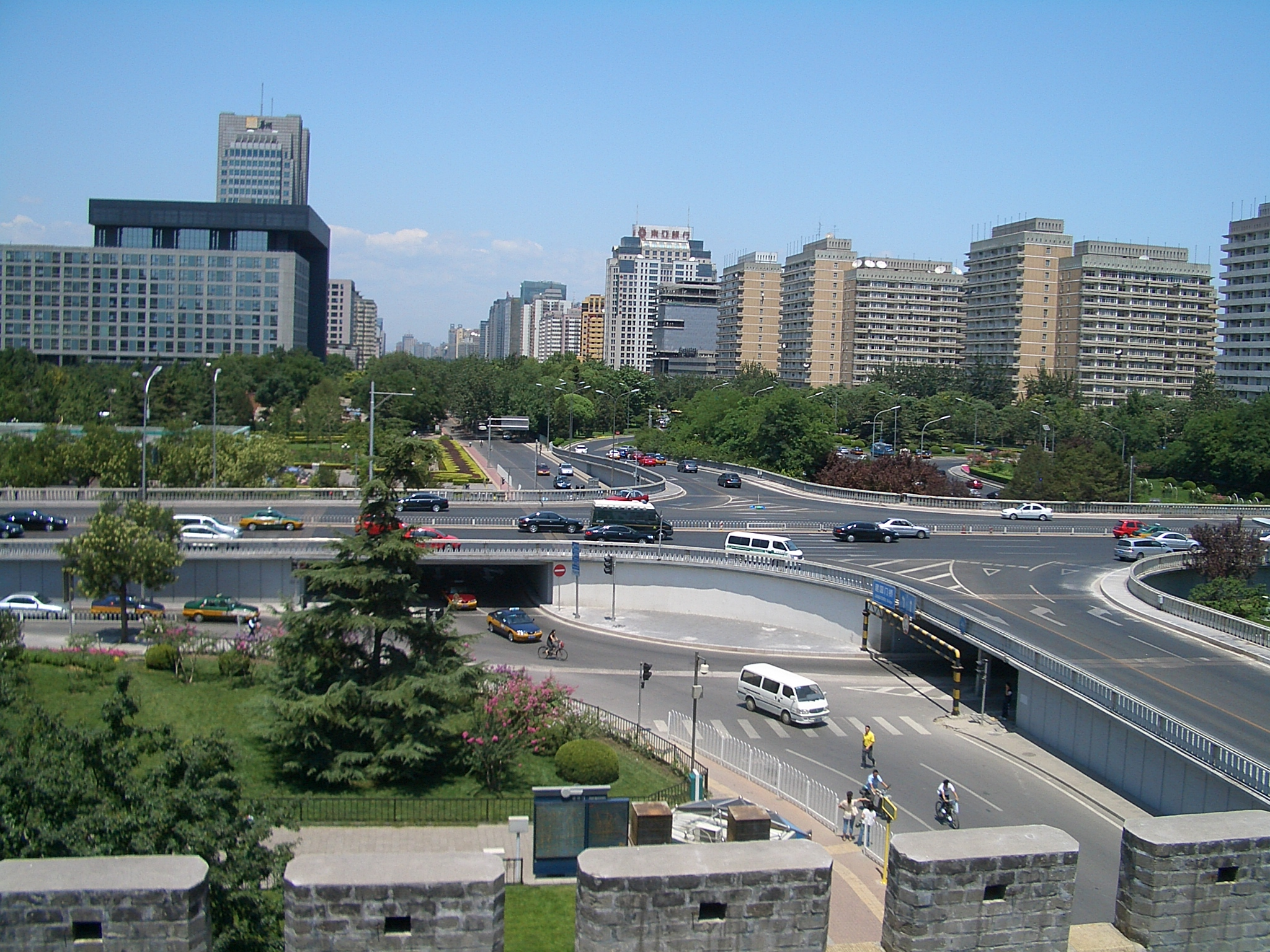
- View of Jianguomen Bridge within the subdistrict

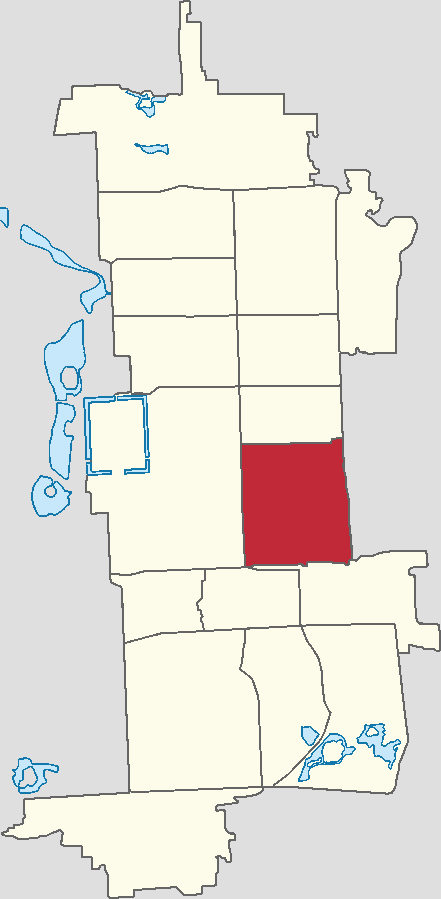
- Location of Jianguomen Subdistrict within Dongcheng District

- Location within Beijing Location within China
- Coordinates: 39°54′37″N 116°26′11″E
- Country: China
- Municipality: Beijing
- District: Dongcheng
- Village-level Division: 9 communities

Area
  - Total: 2.7 km^{2} (1.0 sq mi)

Population (2020)
  - Total: 33,094
  - Density: 12,000/km^{2} (32,000/sq mi)
- Time zone: UTC+8 (China Standard)
- Postal code: 100005
- Area code: 010

Jianguomen Subdistrict (Chinese: 建国门街道; pinyin: jiànguómén jiēdào) is a subdistrict located in the eastern portion of the Dongcheng District, Beijing, China. It contains 9 residential communities within its 2.7 km^{2} area, and as of 2020 its total population is 33,094.

The subdistrict is named after the Jianguomen, a gate on the eastern side of Beijing city wall that once stood in this region.

== History ==
Timeline of changes in the status of Jianguomen Subdistrict
Year	Status
1912	Part of 1st Inner District
1949	Part of Dongcheng District. Following subdistricts were created: Wuliang Daren Hutong; Zhaotangzi Hutong; Xinkailu; Dongzongbu Hutong; Xibiaochu Hutong; Fujian Siying; Huangtu Dayuan; Jiangca Hutong
1955	Reorganized into the following subdistricts: Maojiawan; Dongguanyinsi; Jiangca; Xibiaochu; Fangjingxiang; Suianbo; Zhaotangzi
1958	The seven subdistricts merged into the Jianguomen Subdistrict
1960	Changed into a commune
1990	Restored as a subdistrict

== Administrative Division ==
In 2021, there are 9 communities within the subdistrict:

Administrative Division Code	Community Name in English	Community Name in Simplified Chinese
110101008005	Zhaojialou	赵家楼
110101008006	Xizongbu	西总布
110101008007	Dayabao	大雅宝
110101008012	Suzhou	苏州
110101008014	Waijiaobujie	外交部街
110101008015	Zhandong	站东
110101008016	Jinbaojie	金宝街
110101008017	Buzongbu	东总布
110101008018	Chongnei	崇内

== Local Landmarks ==
- Zhihua Temple
- Beijing Ancient Observatory
- Asbury Church
