= Jianguomen (Beijing) =

Gate in Beijing, China

Coordinates: 39°54′26.34″N 116°25′45.12″E

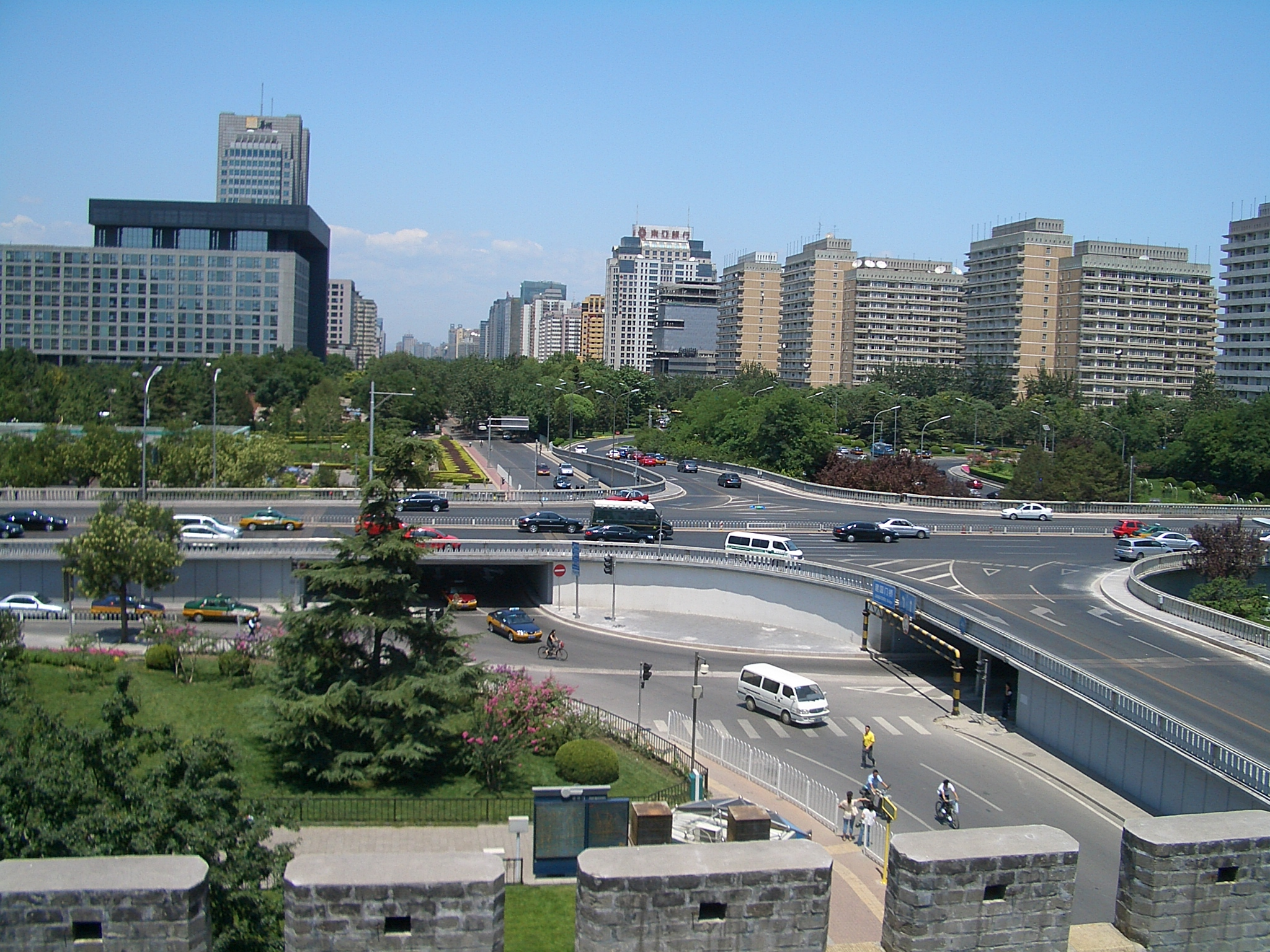
Viewing Jianguomen Bridge (flyover) from the Beijing Ancient Observatory

Jianguomen (simplified Chinese: 建国门; traditional Chinese: 建國門; pinyin: Jiànguómén; lit. 'Gate of Construction of a nation') was a gate in the city wall that once stood in Beijing and is now a transportation hub to the east of city centre. At Jianguomen bridge, the eastern 2nd Ring Road divides Jianguomen Inner Street to the west from Jianguomen Outer Street to the east.

A sub-district, Jianguomen Subdistrict is named after the gate. It is part of the Dongcheng district.

== History ==
Jianguomen was not one of the 16 original gates in Beijing's 15th century Ming-era city wall. The gate was an opening on the east side of Beijing's inner city wall that was created in 1939 during the Japanese occupation of the city to enable access to the industrializing eastern suburbs of the city. The gate was formally named the Jianguomen in November 1945. At that time Beiping, as the city was then known, returned to Chinese rule.

The oldest landmark at Jianguomen is the famous Beijing Ancient Observatory. In the 1970s, numerous embassies of Western countries opened in the area northwest of Jianguomen. In 1973, the Beijing Friendship Store was moved from Wangfujing to Jianguomen Outer Street. The Jianguo Hotel, just east of Jianguomen, opened in 1982, was the first Sino-foreign hotel joint venture in Beijing.

== Local transit ==
The Jianguomen Station of the Beijing Subway is an interchange station for Lines 1 and 2 of the Beijing Subway. Many Beijing Bus routes stop at Jianguomen South (建国门南).

== See also ==
- Tian Mingjian incident
