= Dongsi Subdistrict, Beijing =

Dongsi Subdistrict 东四街道
- Subdistrict
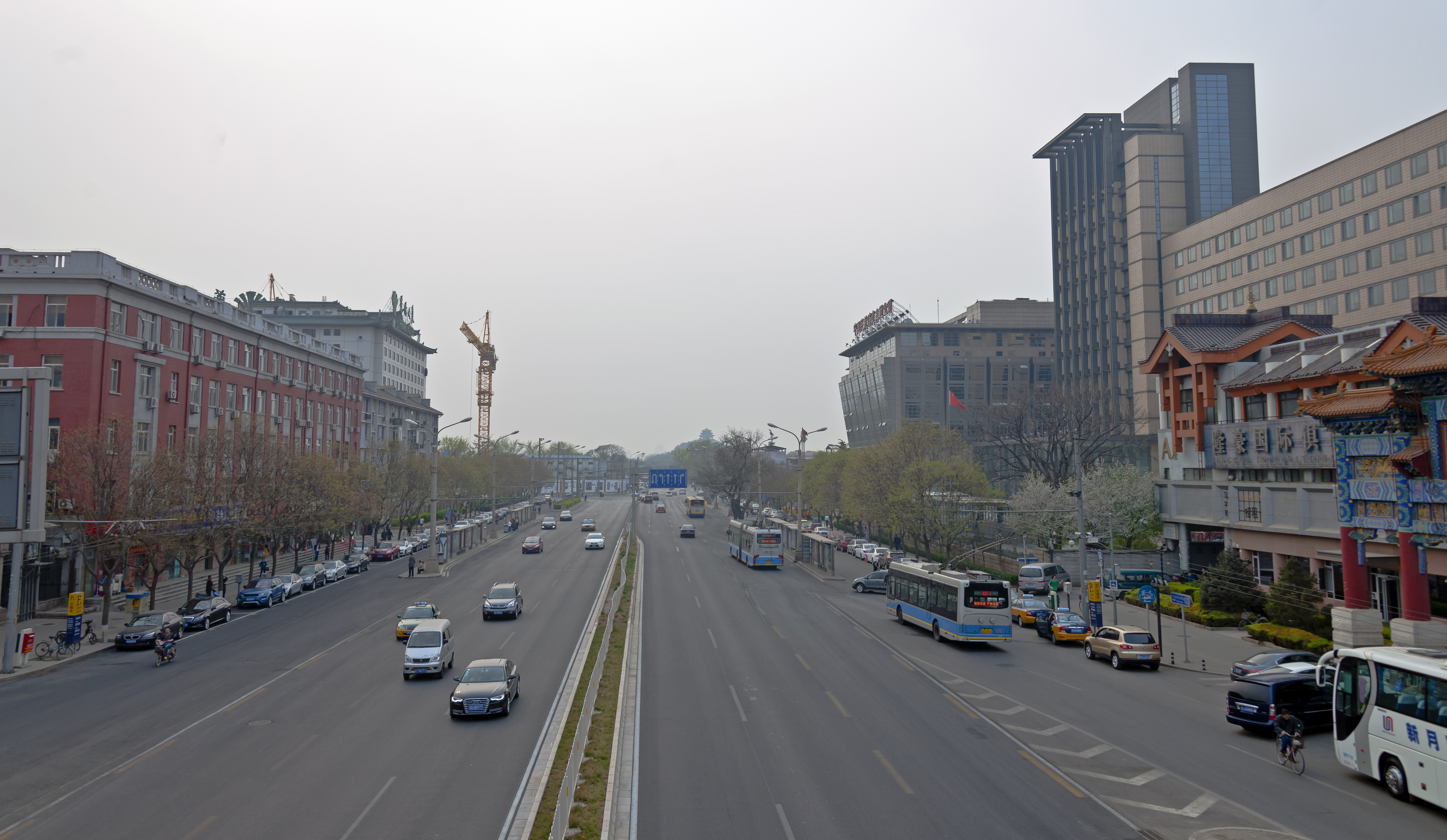
- Looking west from Dongsi along Dongsi West Avenue with Jingshan visible in the distance

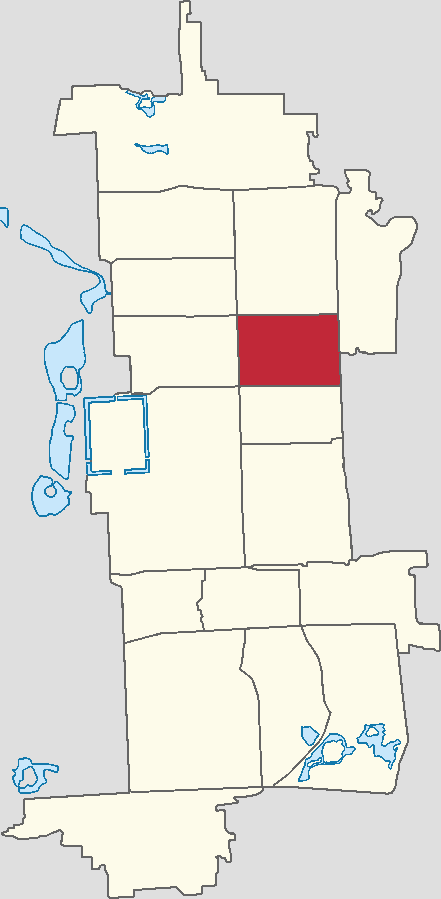
- Location of Dongsi Subdistrict within Dongcheng District

- Location within Beijing Location within China
- Coordinates: 39°55′44″N 116°25′3″E
- Country: China
- Municipality: Beijing
- District: Dongcheng
- Village-level Division: 6 communities

Area
  - Total: 1.42 km^{2} (0.55 sq mi)
- Elevation: 50 m (160 ft)

Population (2020)
  - Total: 33,670
- Time zone: UTC+8 (China Standard)
- Postal code: 100010
- Area code: 010

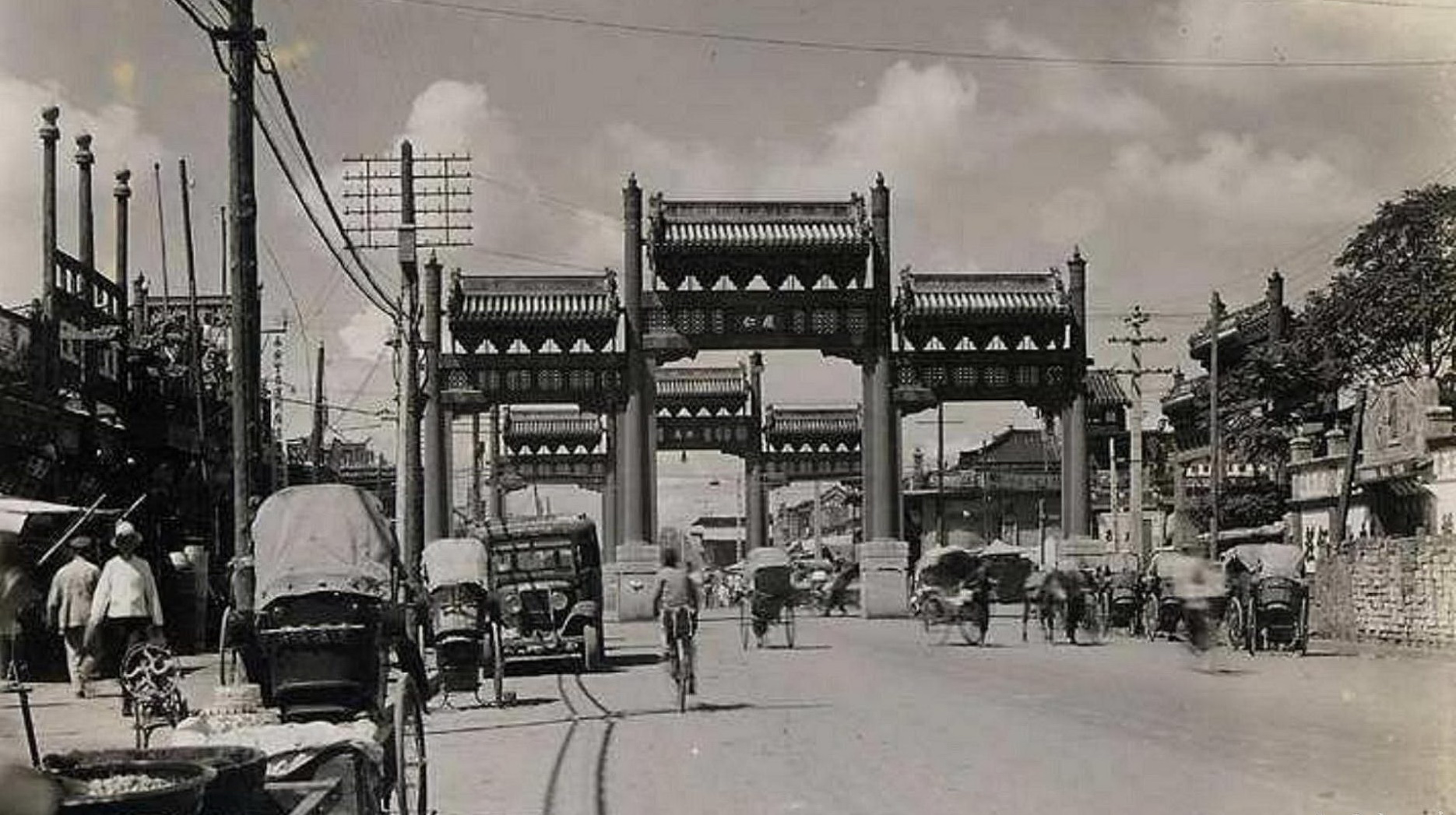
Dongsi and its sign gates in the 1920s

Dongsi (simplified Chinese: 东四; traditional Chinese: 東四; pinyin: Dōngsì, lit. "Eastern Four" or "Eastern Quadrangle") is the name of an intersection and surrounding neighborhood in Dongcheng District, Beijing. Dongsi, at the intersection of what is now Dongsi Avenues North, South and West and Chaoyangmen Inner Street, dates to the Yuan dynasty. The intersection is named after four paifangs or Chinese sign gates that marked the location and is known in Chinese as the Eastern Four Sign Gates or "Eastern Four" for short. Directly due west in Xicheng District, another intersection with four sign gates is called Xisi or the "Western Four".

The sign gates at Dongsi and Xisi were removed in 1958 but the location names remain. Today, the Dongsi Station on Lines 5 and 6 of the Beijing Subway is located underneath the intersection. Beijing Bus 106, 110, 116, 684, and 夜10 stop south of the intersection. Bus 58, 101, 109, 112, 420, and 夜13 stop east of the intersection. Dongsi is known for the Longfusi Snack Street where traditional restaurants such as Baikuilaohao serve Beijing snack cuisine. The Dongsi Mosque, founded in 1356 and rebuilt in 1447, is located just south of the intersection.

== History ==
Timeline of changes in the status of Dongsi
Year	Status
1912	Part of 3rd Inner District
1949	Part of Dongcheng District. Following subidistricts were created: Jibei Hutong; Baoyu Hutong; Dongshuiche Hutong; Batiao Hutong
1955	Jibei and Batiao merged to form Xinsi Subdistrict
1958	The 3 subdistricted merged to create Dongsi Subdistrict
1960	Changed to a commune
1990	Reinstated as a subdistrict

== Dongsi Subdistrict ==
The neighborhood northeast of Dongsi, extending north to Dongsi Shitiao and east to the Second Ring Road, is administered as the Dongsi Subdistrict of Dongcheng District. The subdistrict was established in 1958 and As of 2011, consists of eight residential communities. As of 2020, the Dongsi Subdistrict has a population of 33,670 and an area of 1.42 square kilometres (0.55 sq mi).

In 2021, the subdistrict was divided into the 6 following communities:

Administrative Division Code	Community Name in English	Community Name in Chinese
110101006001	Nanmencang	南门仓
110101006003	Ertiao	二条
110101006006	Liutiao	六条
110101006007	Douban	豆瓣
110101006008	Batiao	八条
110101006009	Zongyuan	总院

== Dongsi's numbered alleyways ==
Running east–west through the Dongsi Subdistrict are a series of parallel alleyways called tiao. These hutongs are numbered in ascending order from south to north beginning with Dongsi Toutiao, the first alleyway of Dongsi, up to Dongsi Shisitiao or the fourteenth alleyway of Dongsi. The tenth alleyway, Dongsi Shitiao, was extended eastward through an opening in the Beijing city wall and was widened in the 1990s to become one of the main east–west thoroughfares in the old city. The Dongsi Shitiao Station on Subway Line 2 marks the intersection of the alleyway and the wall.

== See also ==
- Xisi
- Dongdan
- Xidan
