= Jianguomen (Xi'an) =

- 建国门
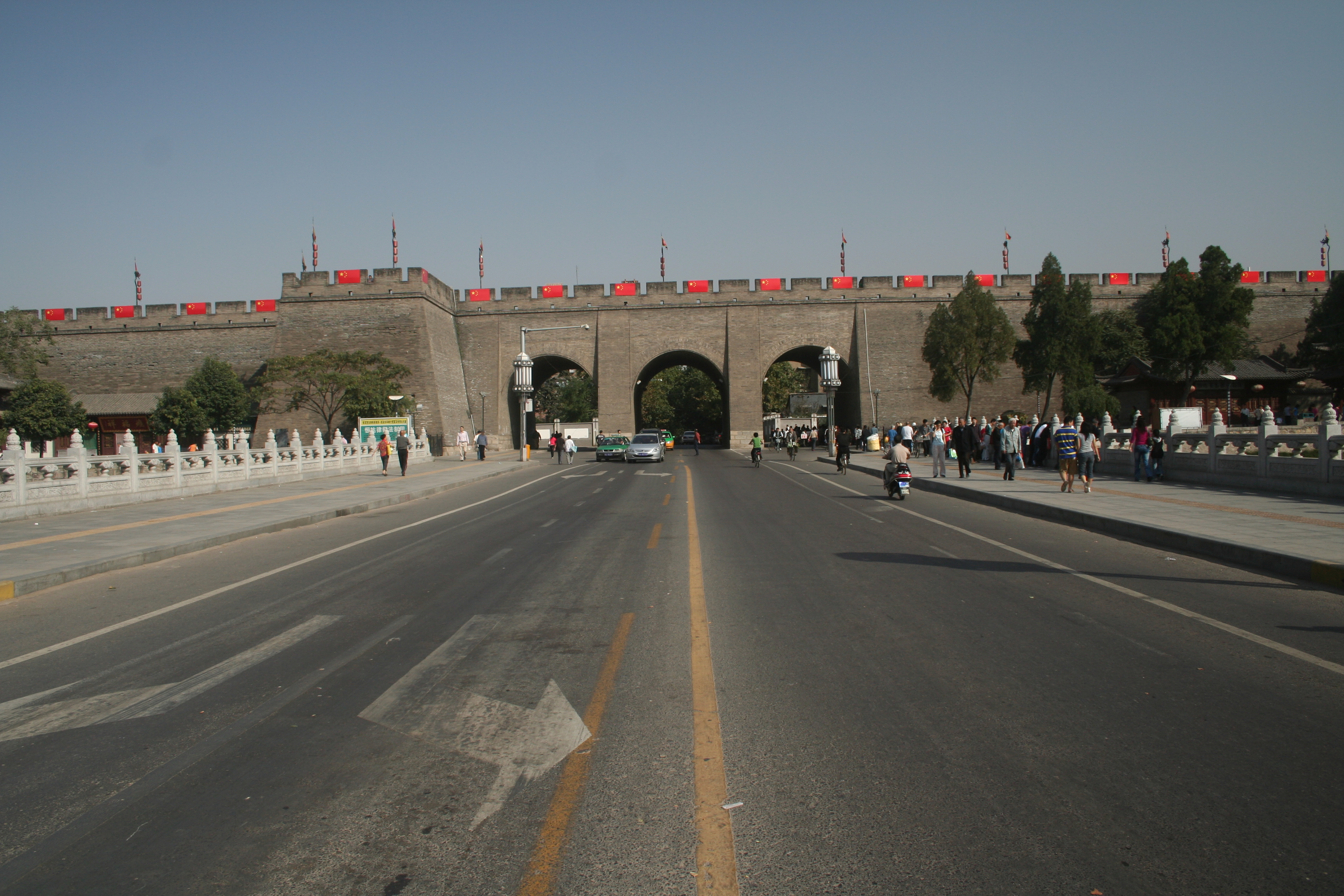
- Jianguomen in year 2009
- Former names: 小差市防空便门

General information
- Status: Completed
- Type: city gate
- Location: Beilin District
- Town or city: Xi'an
- Country: China
- Coordinates: 34.251964°N 108.966941°E

Chinese name
- Simplified Chinese: 建国门
- Traditional Chinese: 建國門
- Literal meaning: Gate of Construction of a nation
Transcriptions
Standard Mandarin
- Hanyu Pinyin: Jiàn guó mén

Jianguomen is a gate of the historic city wall of Xi'an, China.

== History ==
The gate was opened in 1939 as one of the temporarily openings for evacuation from Japanese air raid, thus the gate was known as a 防空便門. Since the opening is near to an area known as 小差市, thus the opening was also known as 小差市防空便門 (Chinese: 小差市防空便门). After the wars and the establishment of the People's Republic of China in 1949, the gate was named Jianguomen. The South Road of 小差市, was also named after Jianguo as Jianguo Road (Chinese: 建国路; pinyin: Jiàn guó lù).

Jianguomen Bridge, completed in 1985, is right in front of the gate.
