= Jianguomen station =

Beijing Subway interchange station

Jianguomen 建国门
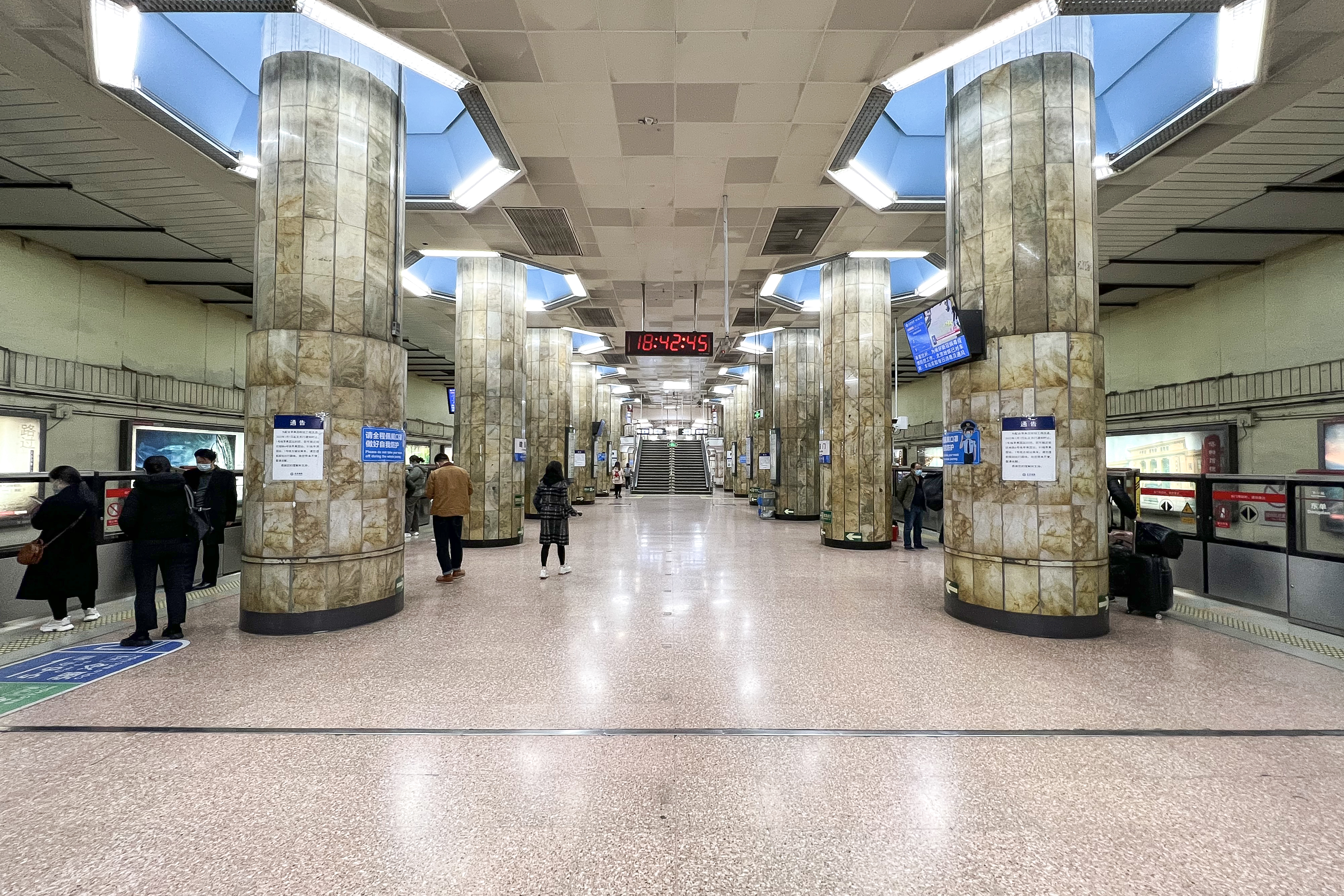
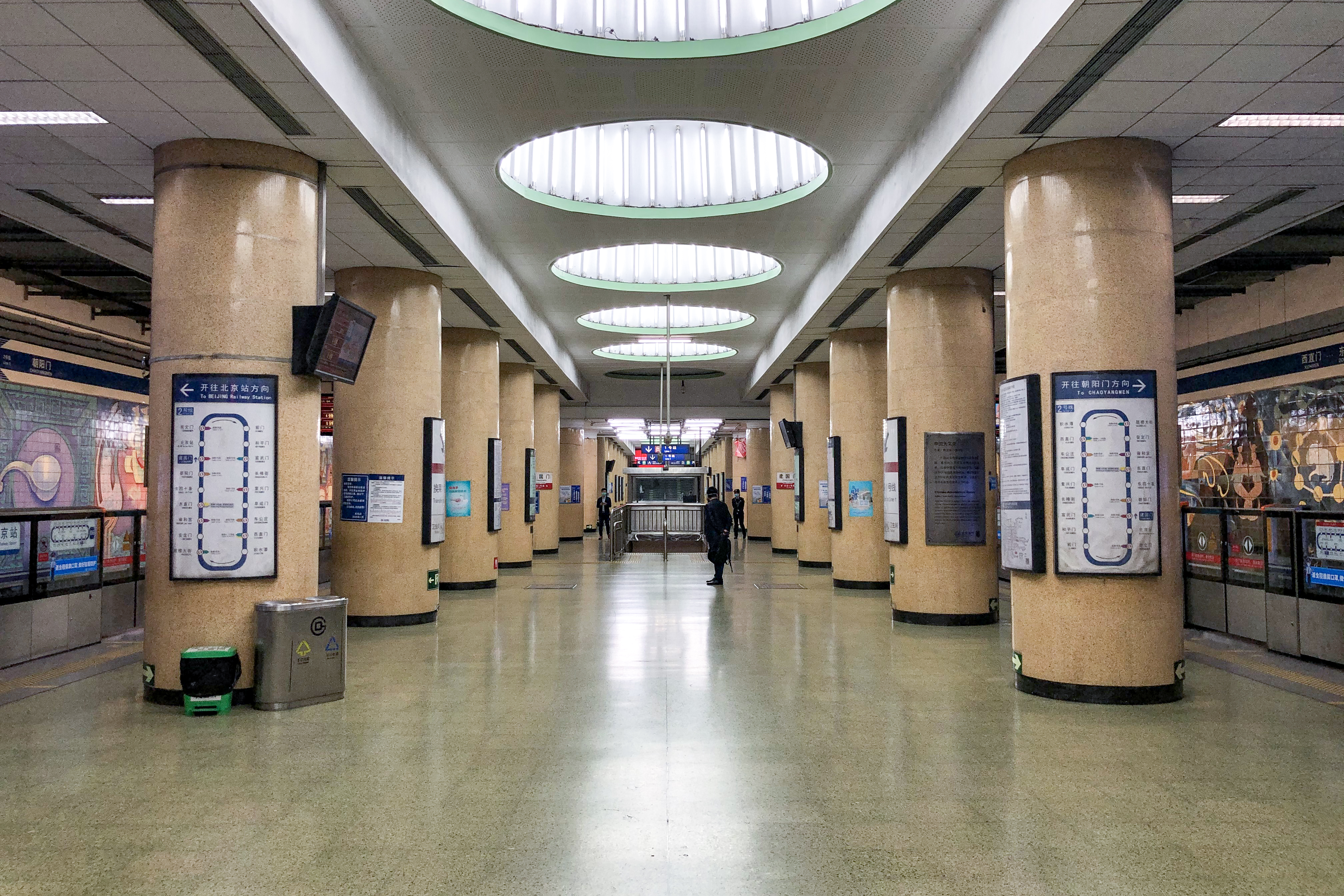
- Line 1 platform Line 2 platform

General information
- Location: Jianguomen; Dongcheng District / Chaoyang District border, Beijing; China
- Coordinates: 39°54′31″N 116°26′09″E
- Operator: Beijing Mass Transit Railway Operation Corporation Limited
- Lines: Line 1; Line 2
- Platforms: 4 (2 island platforms)
- Tracks: 4

Construction
- Structure type: Underground
- Accessible: Yes

Other information
- Station code: 120 (Line 1); 211 (Line 2)

History
- Opened: September 28, 1999; 26 years ago (Line 1); September 20, 1984; 41 years ago (Line 2)

Services
Preceding station	Beijing Subway	Following station
Dongdan towards Pingguoyuan	Line 1	Yong'an Li towards Universal Resort
Chaoyang Men outer loop / anticlockwise	Line 2	Beijing railway station inner loop / clockwise
Location
- Location within Beijing

Jianguomen Station (Chinese: 建国门站; pinyin: Jiànguómén Zhàn) is an interchange station on Line 1 and Line 2 of the Beijing Subway at Jianguomen in Dongcheng District and Chaoyang District, Beijing. The station handles over 170,000 transfers between Lines 1 and 2 per day.

== Station layout ==
Both the line 1 and 2 stations have underground island platforms.

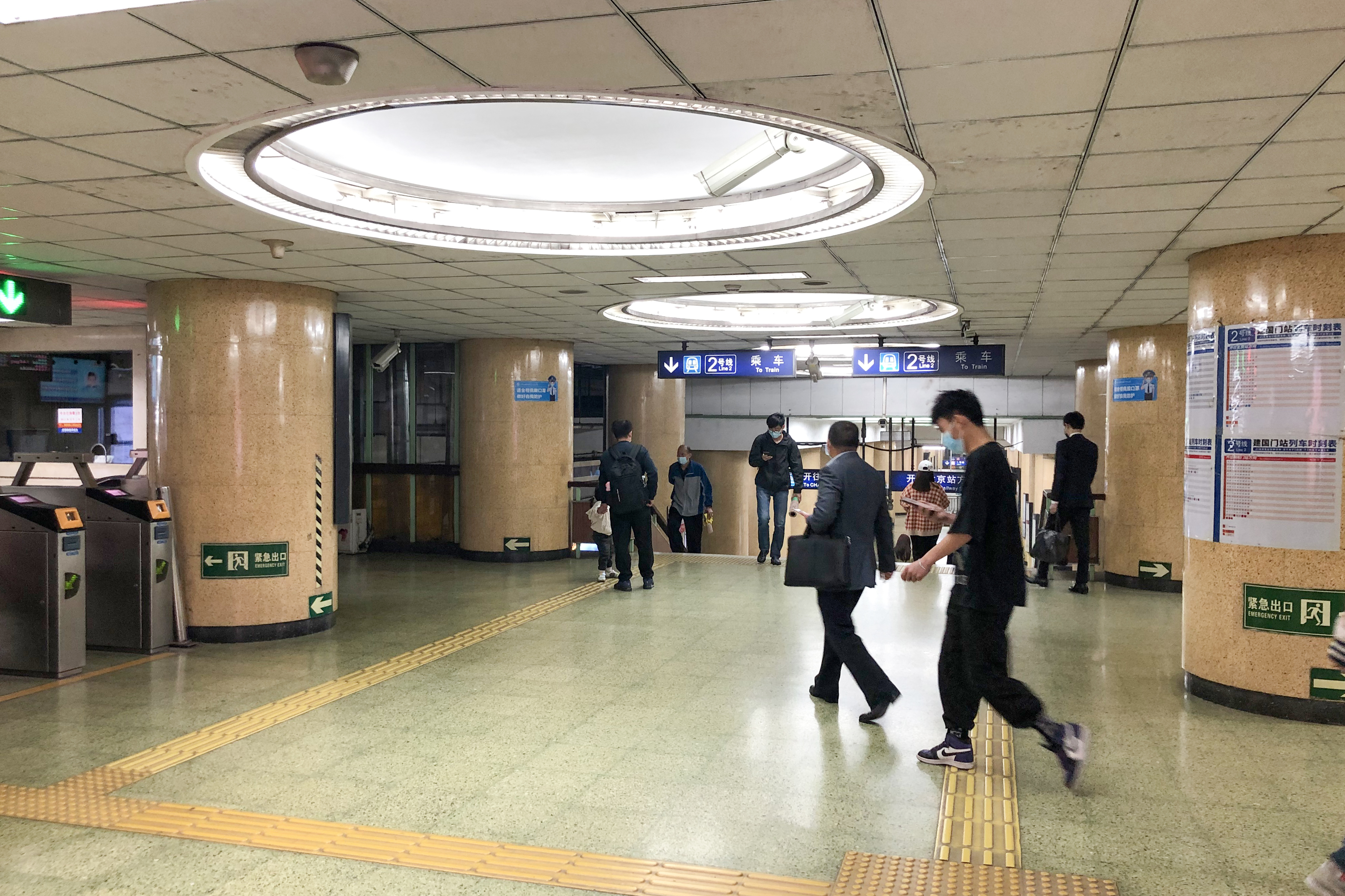
Line 2 north concourse

== Exits ==
There are three exits, lettered A, B, and C. Exits B and C are accessible.

== Around the station ==
- Office of the Macau Special Administrative Region in Beijing
