= Tiantongyuanbei station =

Beijing Subway station

Tiantongyuanbei 天通苑北
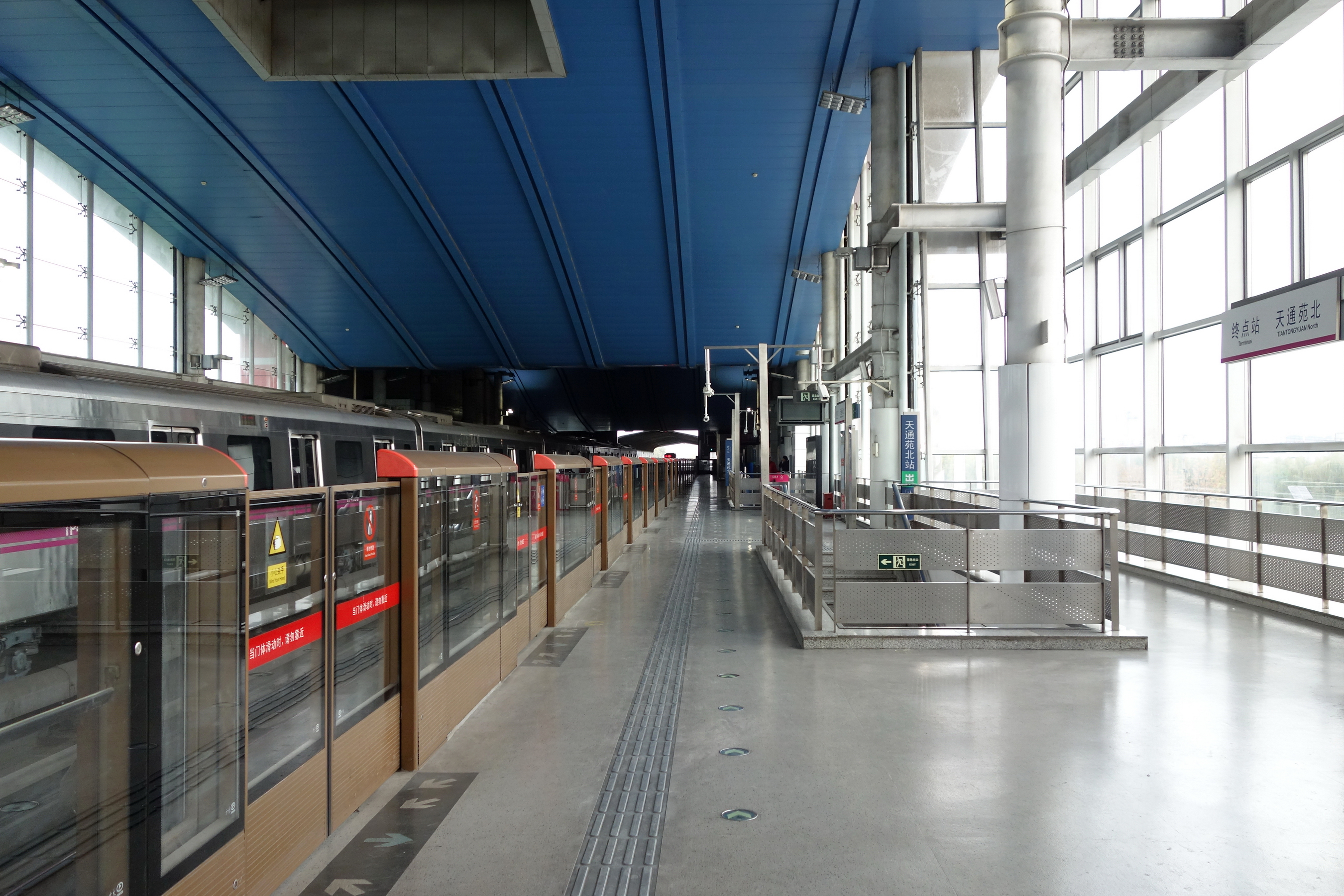
- Northbound platform

General information
- Location: Litang Road (立汤路); Tiantongyuanbei Subdistrict, Changping District, Beijing; China
- Coordinates: 40°05′01″N 116°24′47″E
- Operator: Beijing Mass Transit Railway Operation Corporation Limited
- Line: Line 5
- Platforms: 2 (2 side platforms)
- Tracks: 2

Construction
- Structure type: Elevated
- Accessible: Yes

History
- Opened: October 7, 2007

Services
Preceding station	Beijing Subway	Following station
Terminus	Line 5	Tiantongyuan towards Songjiazhuang
Location
- Location within Beijing

Tiantongyuanbei station (Chinese: 天通苑北站; pinyin: Tiāntōngyuàn Běi Zhàn) is a station on and the northern terminus of Line 5 of the Beijing Subway.

The station has 2 elevated side platforms.

== Exits ==
There are 4 exits, lettered A, B, C, and D. Exit C is accessible.
