= Houhai =

Lake in People's Republic of China

Coordinates: 39°56′28″N 116°22′44″E

- (Chinese: 后海; lit. 'Rear Lake')
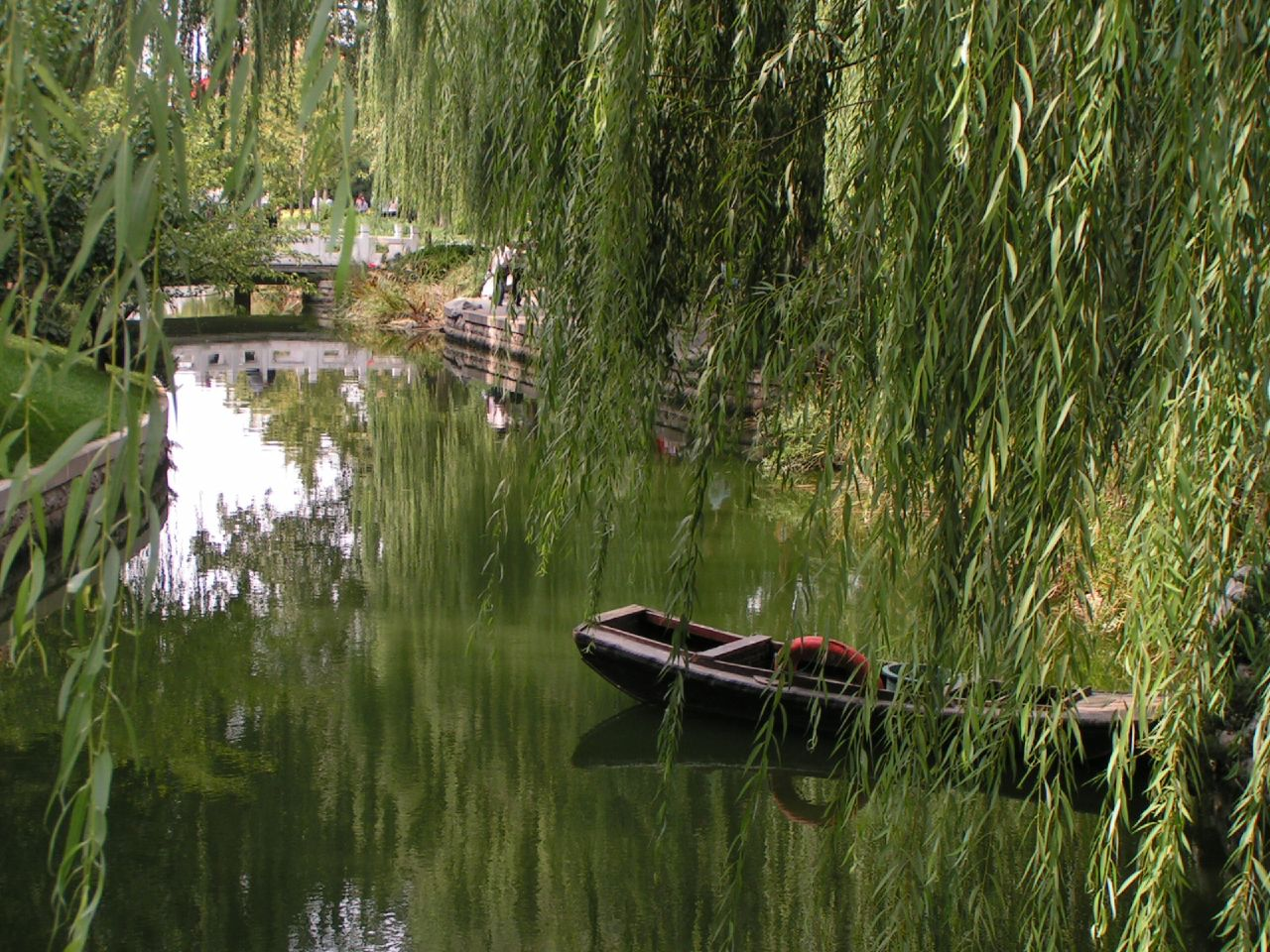

- Location within Beijing
- Interactive map of Houhai
- Location: Xicheng District, Beijing
- Group: Shichahai
- Type: Lake
- Primary inflows: Xihai
- Primary outflows: Qianhai
- Basin countries: China
- Built: Yuan dynasty (c.13th century)
- Surface area: 35 hectares (86 acres)

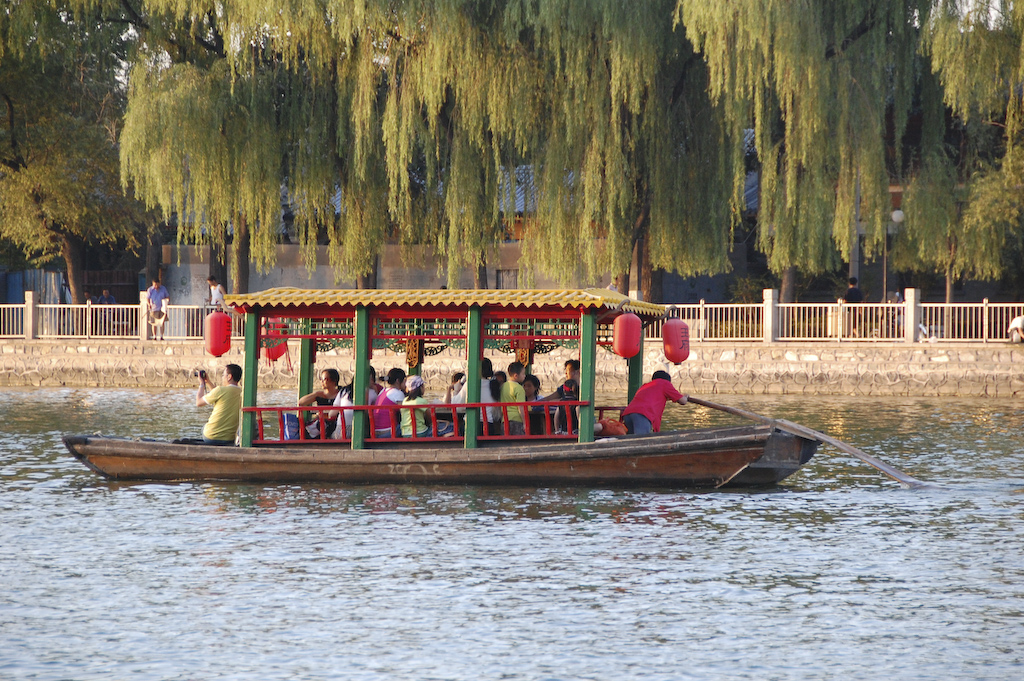
Strolling the Houhai lake

Houhai (Chinese: 后海; pinyin: hòuhǎi; lit. 'Rear Lake') is a lake and its surrounding neighborhood in Xicheng District of central Beijing, China. Houhai is the largest of the three lakes, along with Qianhai 'Front Lake' and Xihai 'Western Lake', that compose Shichahai, the collective name for the three northernmost lakes in central Beijing. Since the early 2000s, the hutong neighborhood around Houhai has become known for its nightlife as many residences along the lake shore have been converted into restaurants, bars, and cafes. The area is especially popular with foreign tourists visiting Beijing and is also often visited by the expatriate community and the younger generations of locals.

The Former Residence of Soong Ching-ling and Prince Gong Mansion are both located in the Houhai neighborhood.

== History ==
The artificial lake of Houhai was built during the Yuan dynasty, and formed part of the ancient waters of the dynasty. The area was gentrified by the Yuan, and was exclusively reserved to the royal family. Built in the Yuan winter capital of Dadu, today it is located in the center of Beijing facing the Forbidden City and today is renowned as a place of relaxation for Beijingers, and for its nightlife.

The street network of Houhai was also created during the Yuan dynasty. The Yuan's 787 m (2,582 ft) long Nanluogu Lane is considered one of the oldest hutongs in Beijing, located in one of its oldest neighborhoods. Many buildings are very old, and exhibit the traditional Beijing architectural features.

== Access ==
Beijing Bus routes 5, 60, 90, 107 and 204 stop at the Drum Tower, just east of Houhai. The nearest subway station at Beihai North on Line 6 is about half a kilometer west of Qianhai. To reach Houhai, subway riders must walk north along the shore of Qianhai to Houhai.

== Images ==
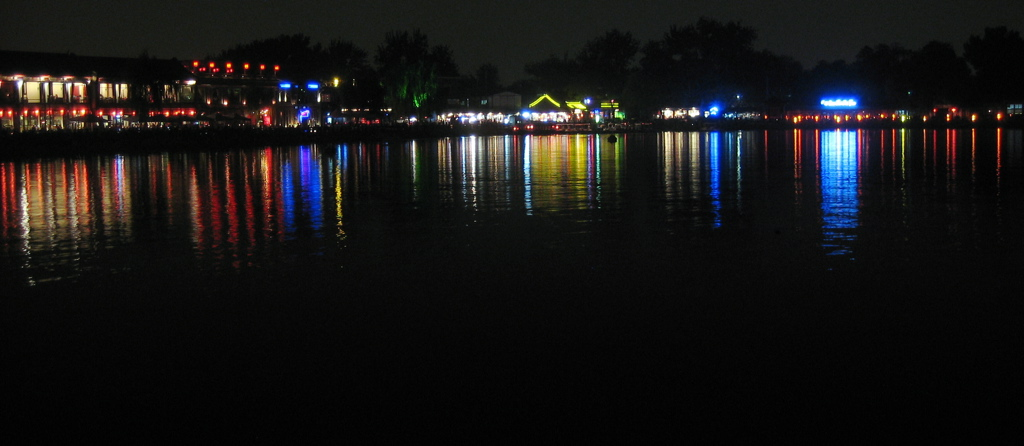
The Houhai lake in Beijing at night

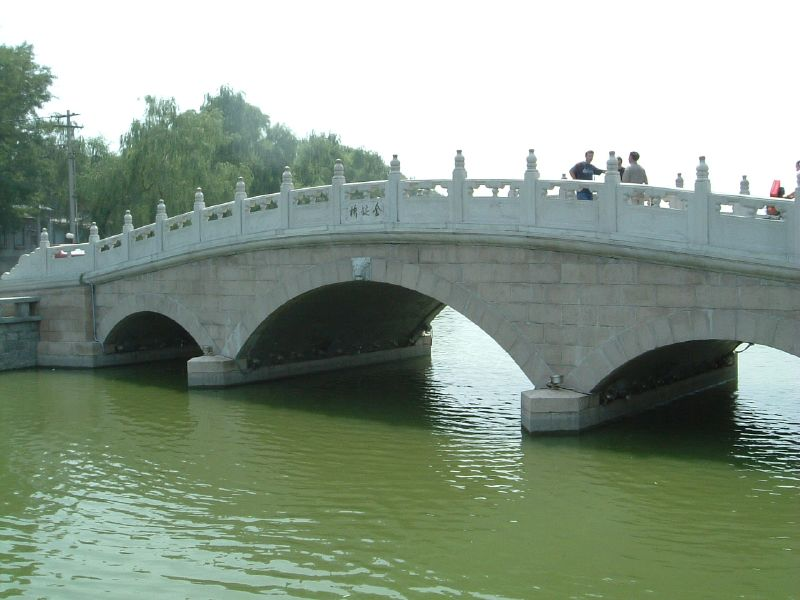
A stone bridge across the lake

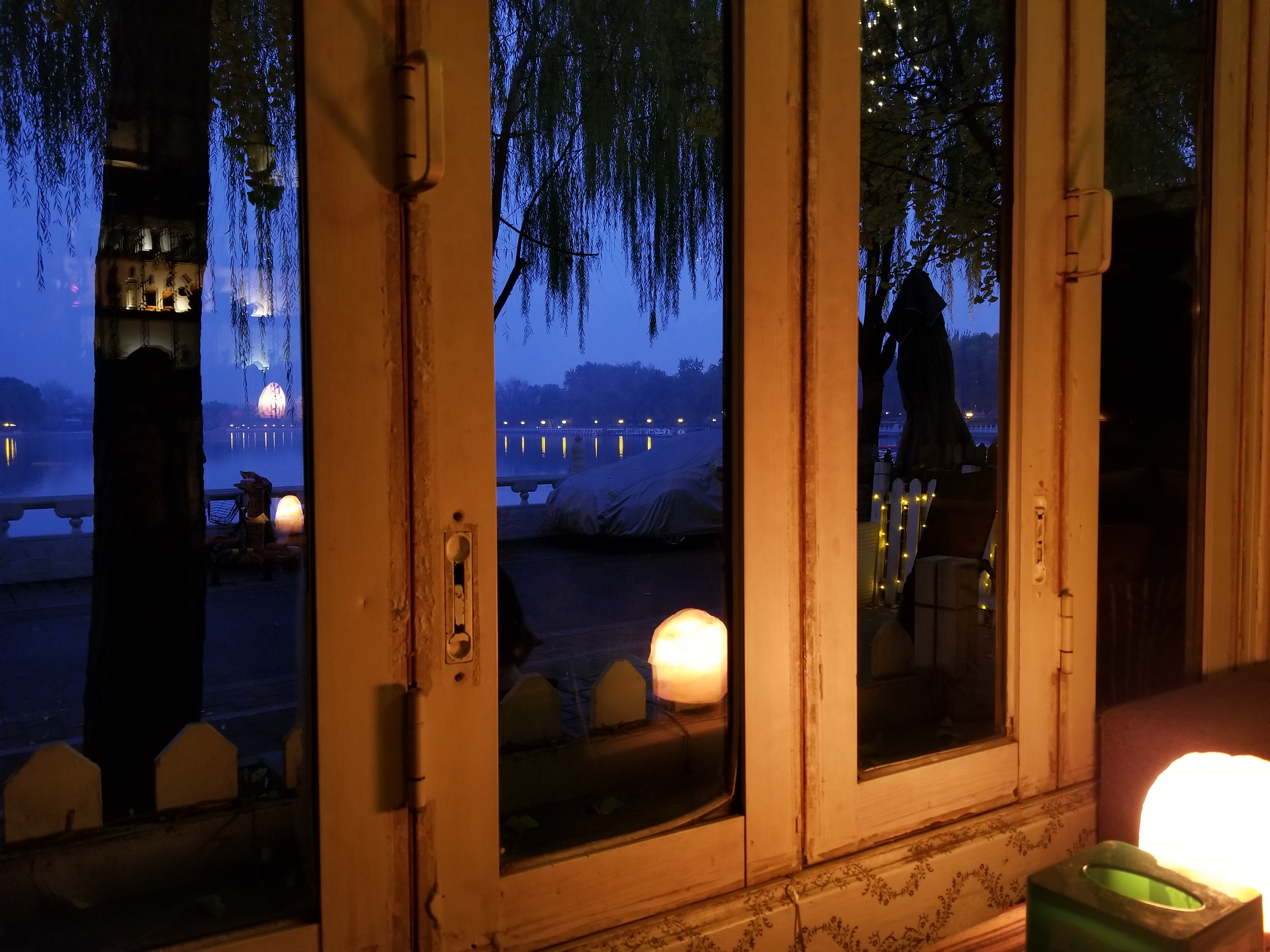
Houhai from a restaurant on the west shore

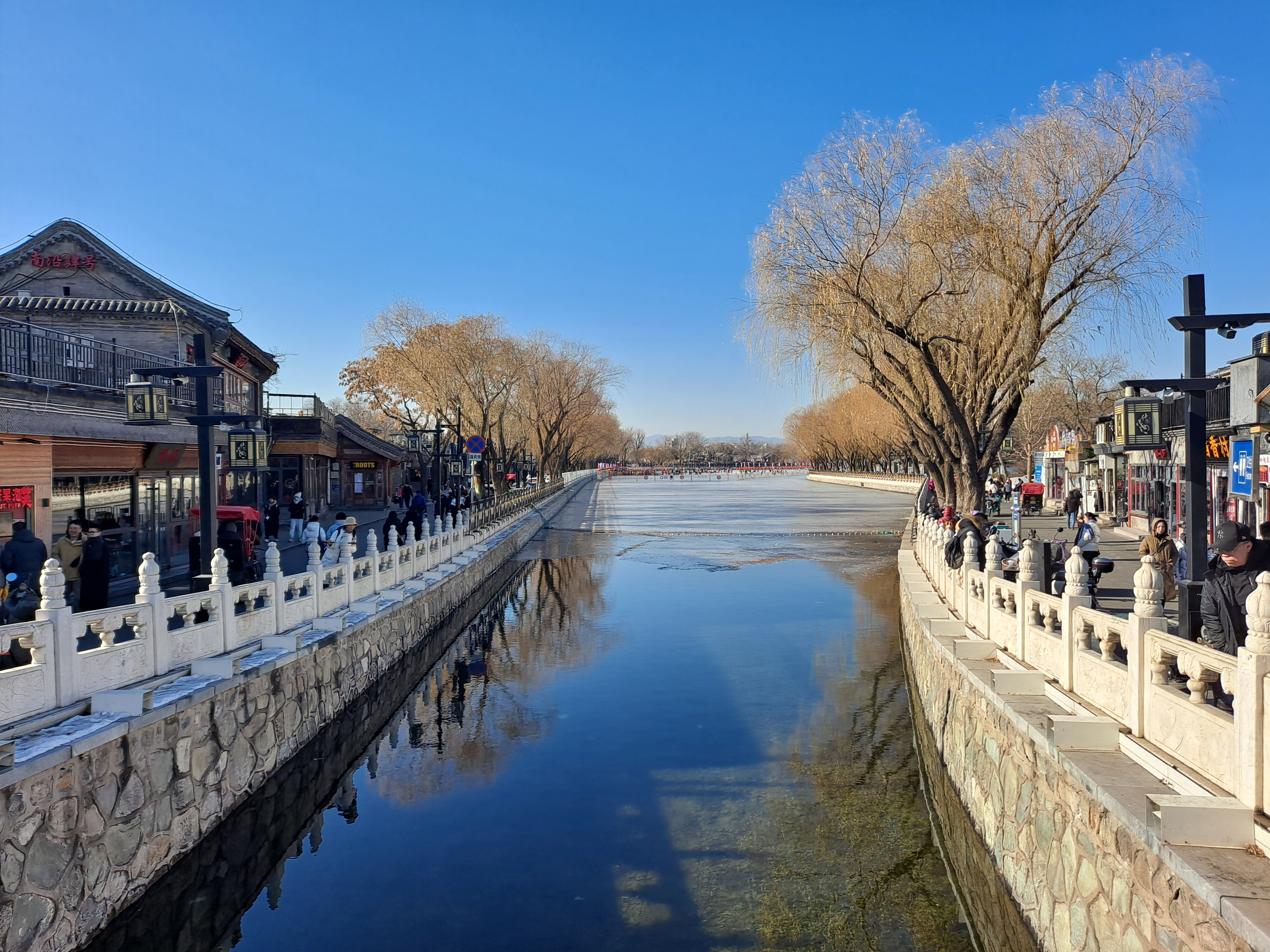
Houhai Lake in winter
