= List of hutongs in Beijing =

The following is a list of hutongs in Beijing, People's Republic of China:

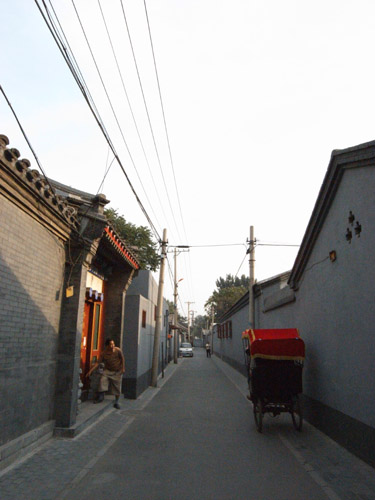
Typical view inside a Beijing hutong

- Bada Hutong
- Dongjiaominxiang Hutong, the longest hutong
- Fengfu Hutong
- Guozijian Street
- Jinyu Hutong
- Jiuwan Hutong
- Ju'er Hutong
- Lingjing Hutong, the widest hutong
- Liulichang Street
- Mao'er Hutong
- Nanluoguxiang Hutong
- Qianshi Hutong (Money Market), the narrowest hutong
- Xijiaominxiang Hutong
- Yandai xiejie
- Yichi Dajie (One Foot Street), the shortest hutong
- Zhuanta Hutong (Brick Pagoda Hutong)
- Doufuchi Hutong
- Beiluoguxiang
- Lishi Hutong
- Yancao Hutong
- Yanle Hutong
- Bensi Hutong
- Neiwubu Hutong
- Shijia Hutong
- Guangming Hutong
- Dongtangzi Hutong
- Xizongbu Hutong
- Xinkailu Hutong
- Beijige Santiao
- Beijige Toutiao
- Suzhou Hutong
- Hougou Hutong
- Chuanban Hutong
- Shoupa Hutong
- Shiban Hutong
- Xiaoxinkai Hutong
