= Nanluogu Xiang station =

Beijing Subway station

Nanluogu Xiang 南锣鼓巷
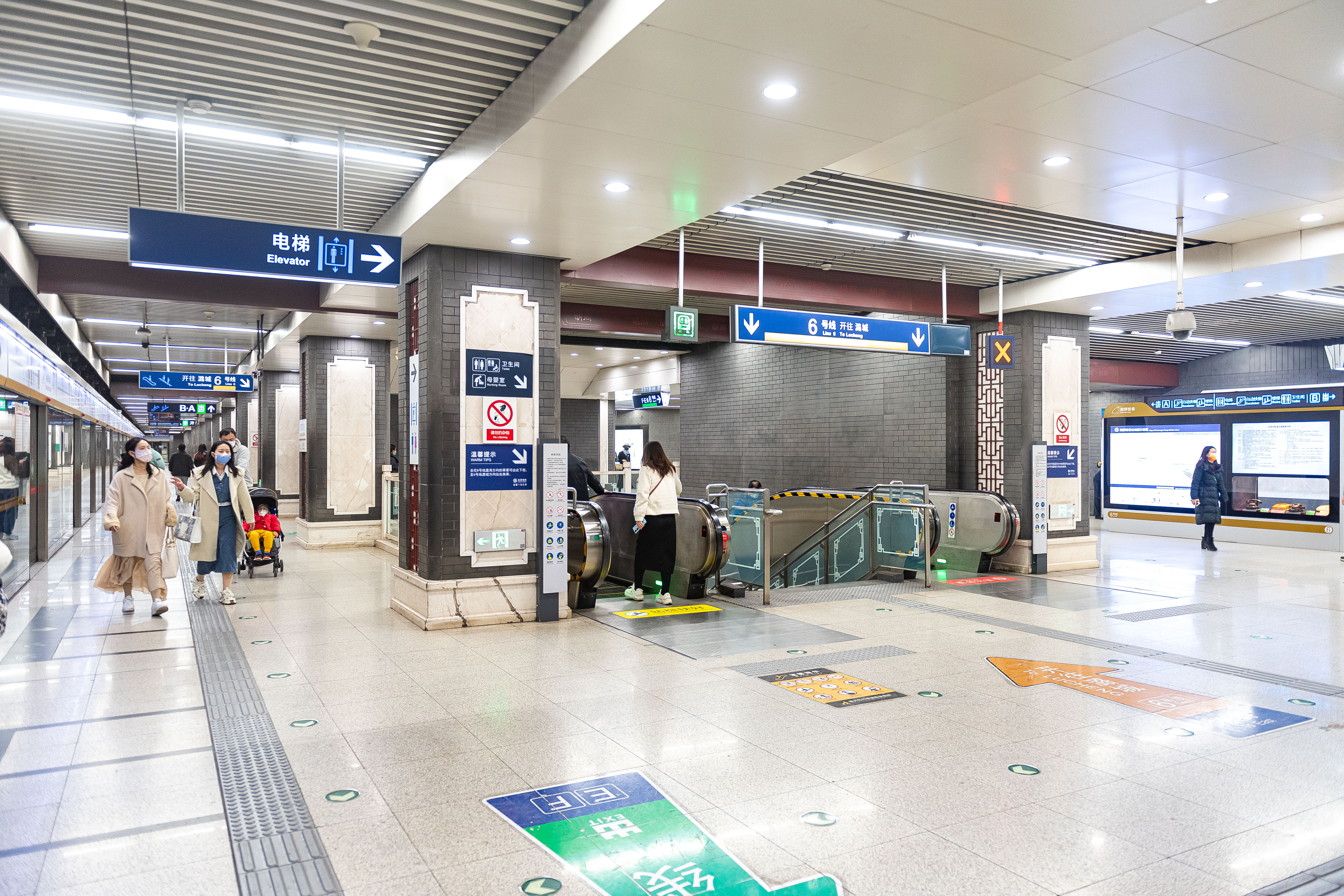
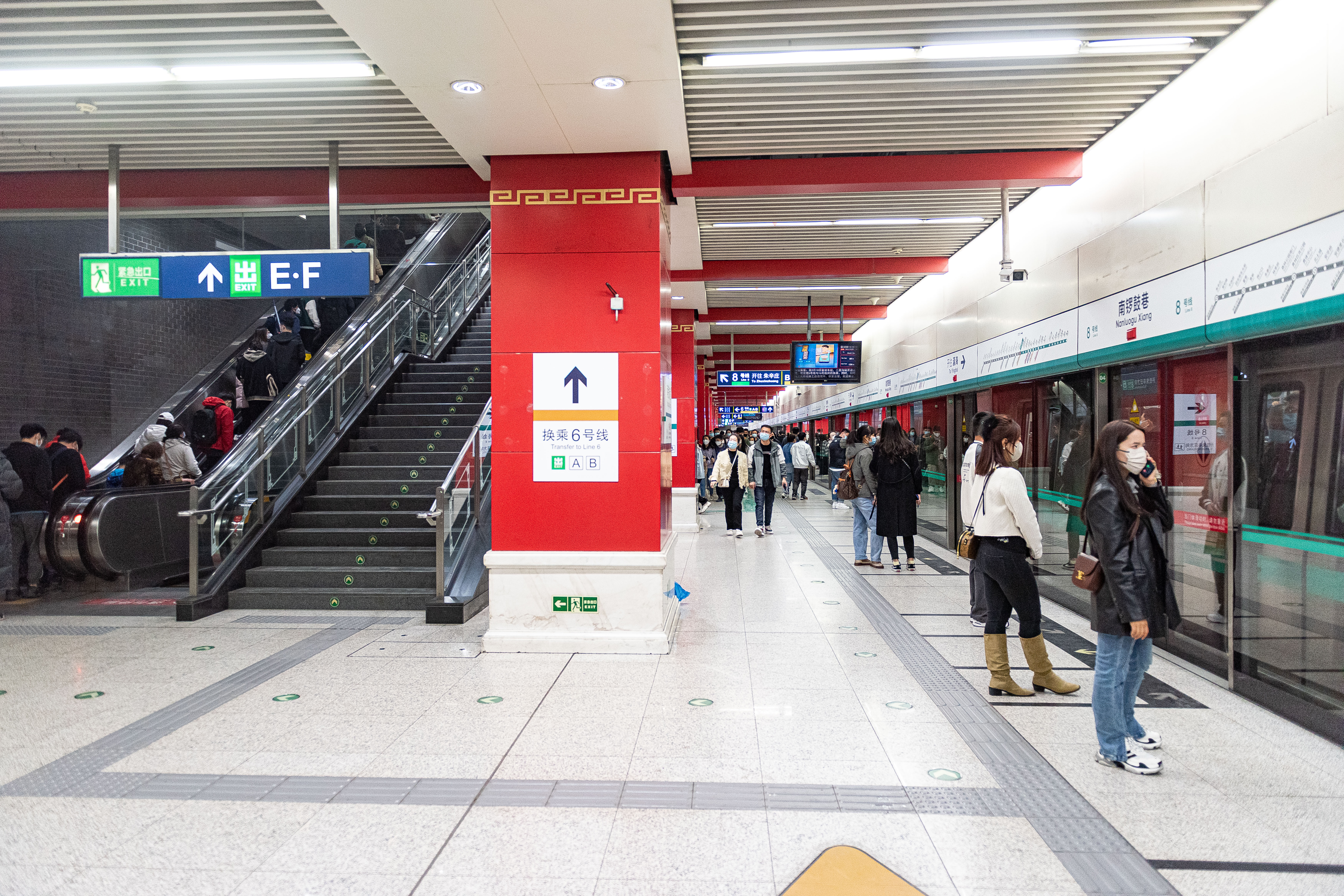
- Line 6 westbound platform Line 8 southbound platform

General information
- Location: Di'anmen East Street and Nanluoguxiang; Dongcheng District, Beijing; China
- Coordinates: 39°56′02″N 116°24′15″E
- Operator: Beijing Mass Transit Railway Operation Corporation Limited
- Lines: Line 6; Line 8
- Platforms: 4 (2 split island platforms)
- Tracks: 4

Construction
- Structure type: Underground
- Accessible: Yes

History
- Opened: December 30, 2012; 13 years ago (Line 6); December 28, 2013; 12 years ago (Line 8)

Services
Preceding station	Beijing Subway	Following station
Beihaibei towards Jin'anqiao	Line 6	Dongsi towards Luyang
Shichahai towards Zhuxinzhuang	Line 8	National Art Museum towards Yinghai
Location
- Location within Beijing

Nanluogu Xiang (simplified Chinese: 南锣鼓巷站; traditional Chinese: 南鑼鼓巷站; pinyin: Nánluógǔ Xiàng Zhàn) is a station on Line 6 and Line 8 of the Beijing Subway in central Beijing. The station opened on December 30, 2012 to Line 6 service, and to Line 8 service in December 2013. It is located near to the south entrance of the Nanluoguxiang alley, after which it is named. It will also become a transfer station for the Planned Phase 2 of Line 3 in the future.

This station features split platforms, a unique feature in the Beijing Subway, to allow cross-platform interchange between Line 6 and 8.

== Station layout ==
Both the line 6 and 8 stations have underground stacked side platforms. However, it can be considered as 2 entire split island platforms the platforms themselves aren't separate from each other. The southbound line 8 and eastbound line 6 platforms are located under the northbound line 8 and westbound line 6 platforms.

== Exits ==
There are four exits, lettered A, B, E, and F. Exits B and E are accessible.

== Gallery ==
=== Line 6 ===
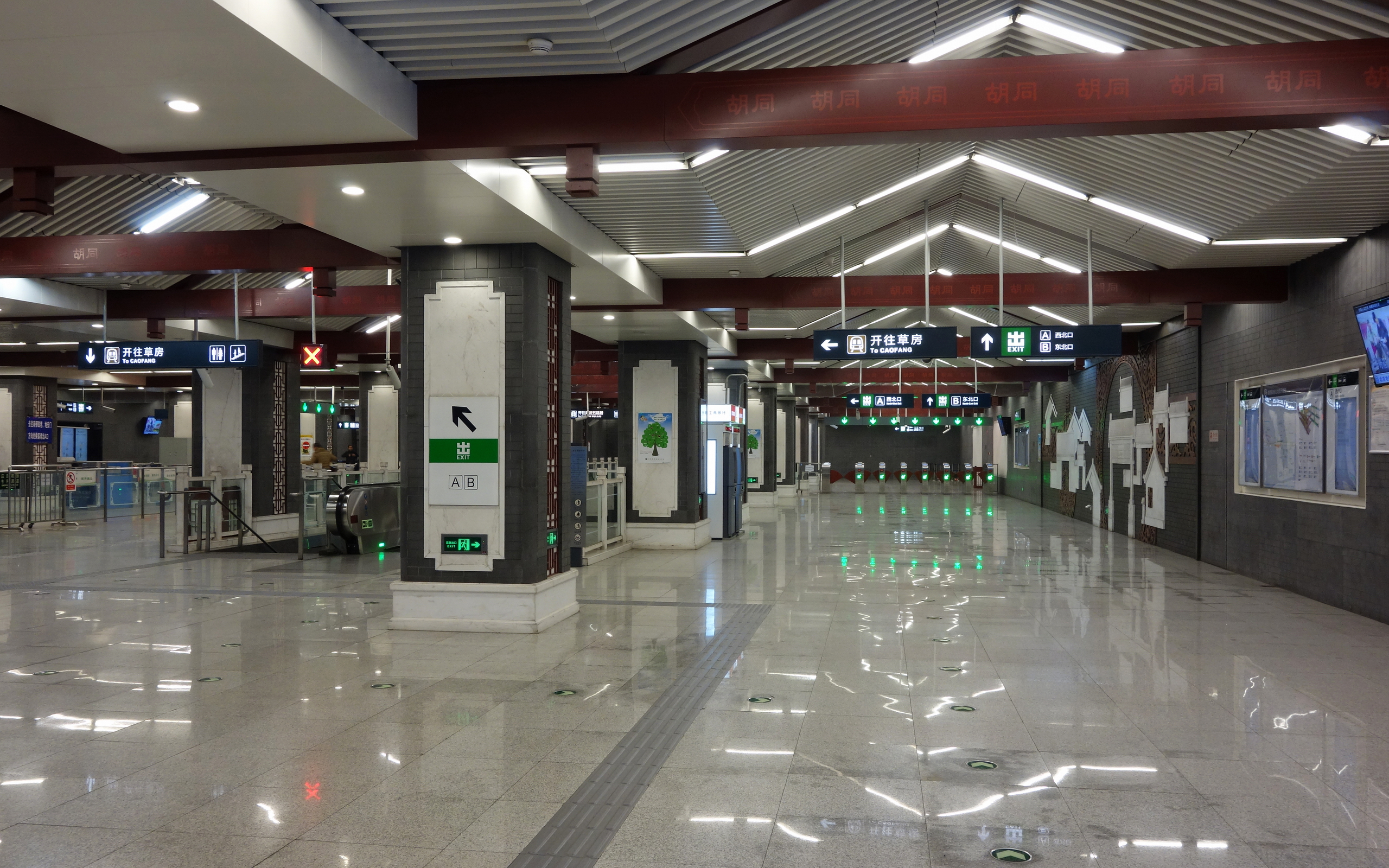
Station Hall

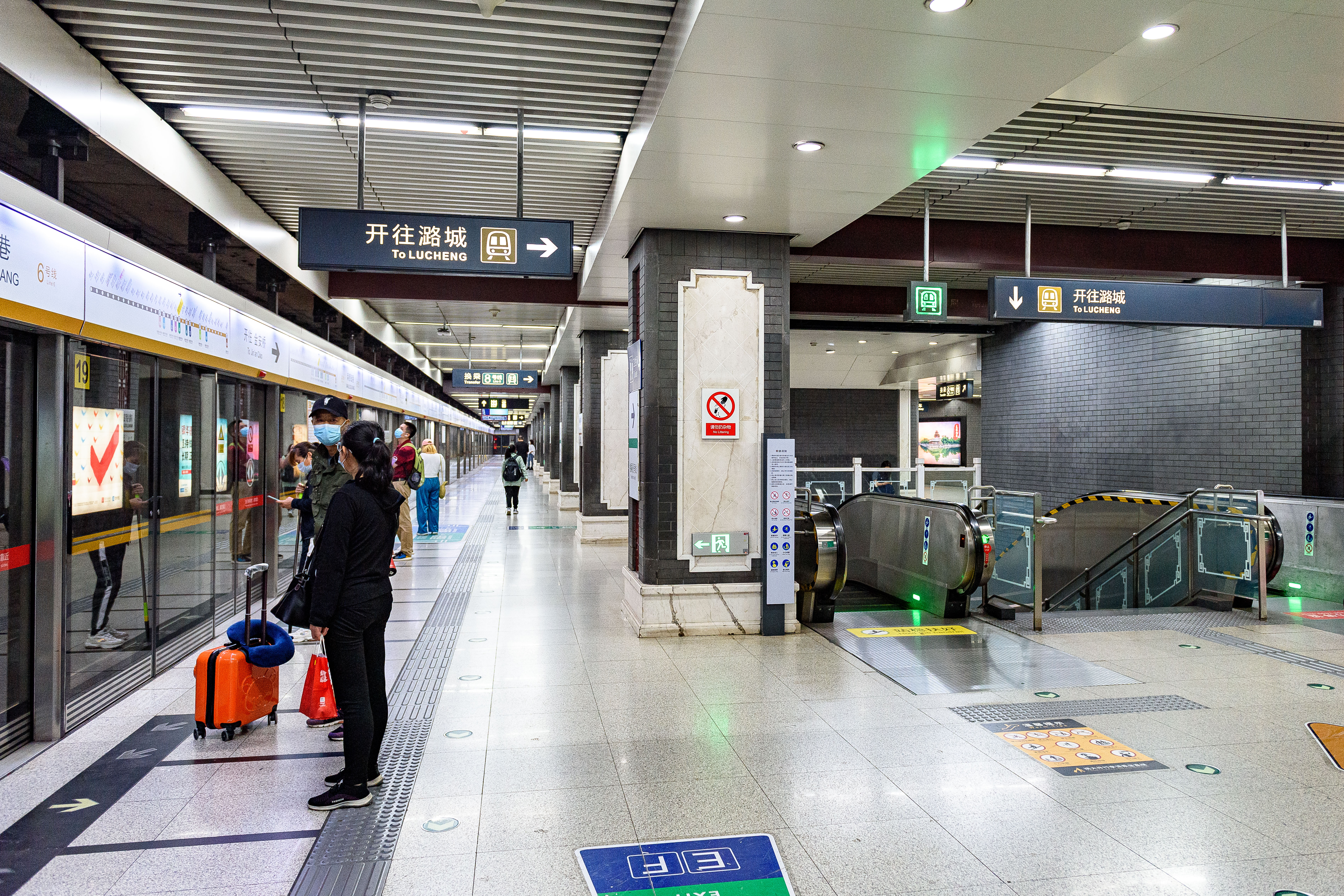
Westbound platform (September 2021)

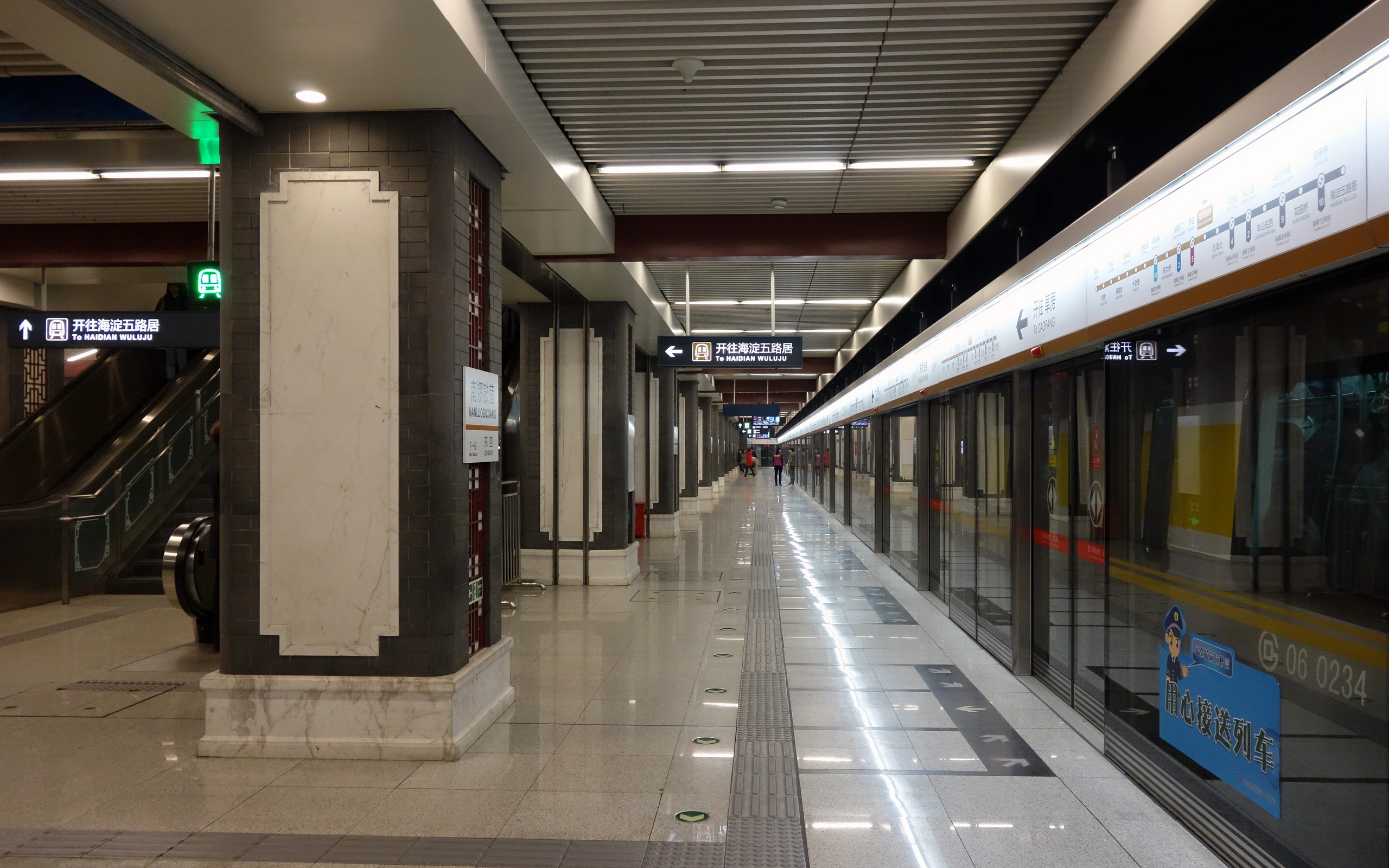
Eastbound platform (November 2013)

=== Line 8 ===
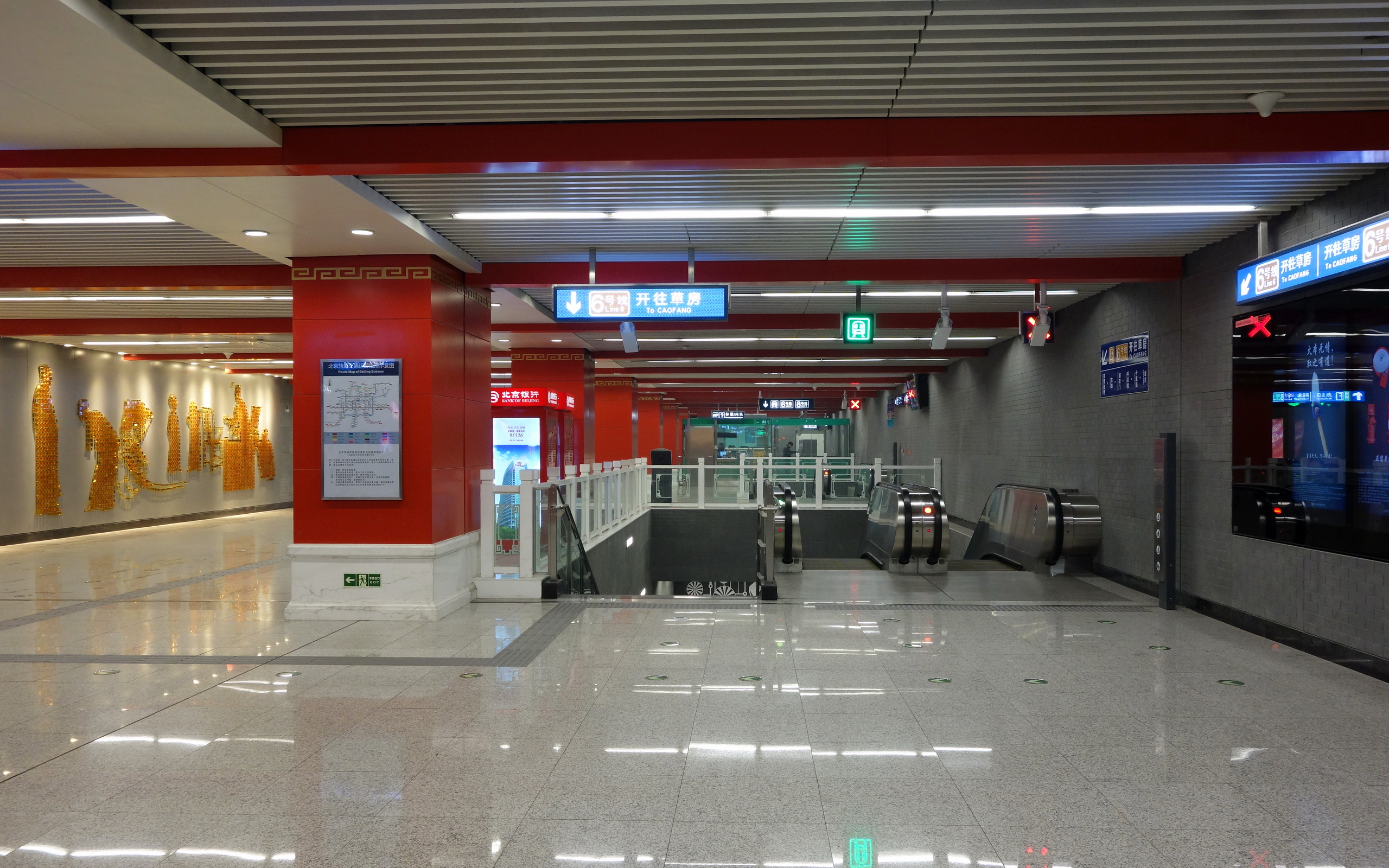
Station Hall

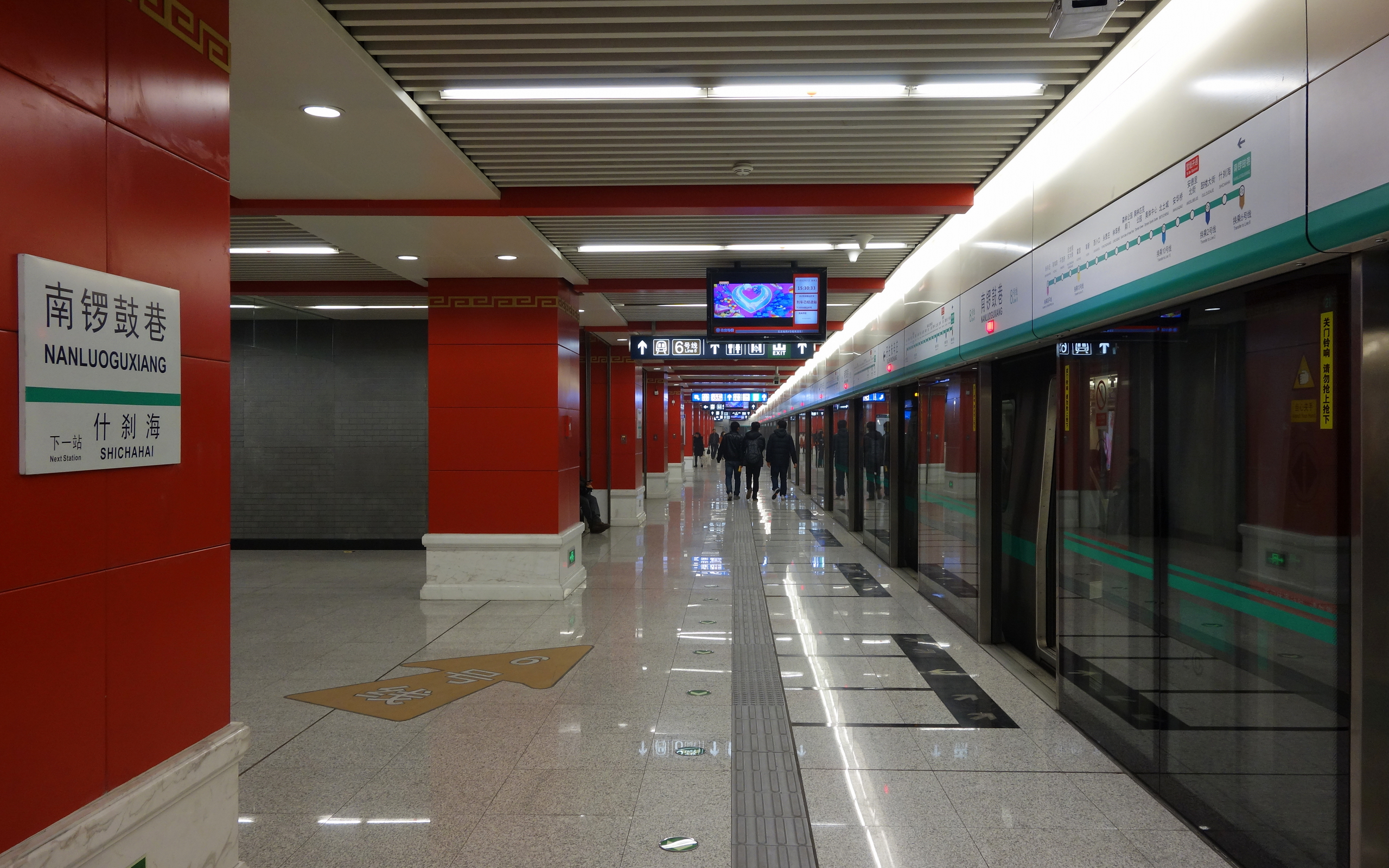
Northbound platform (February 2014)

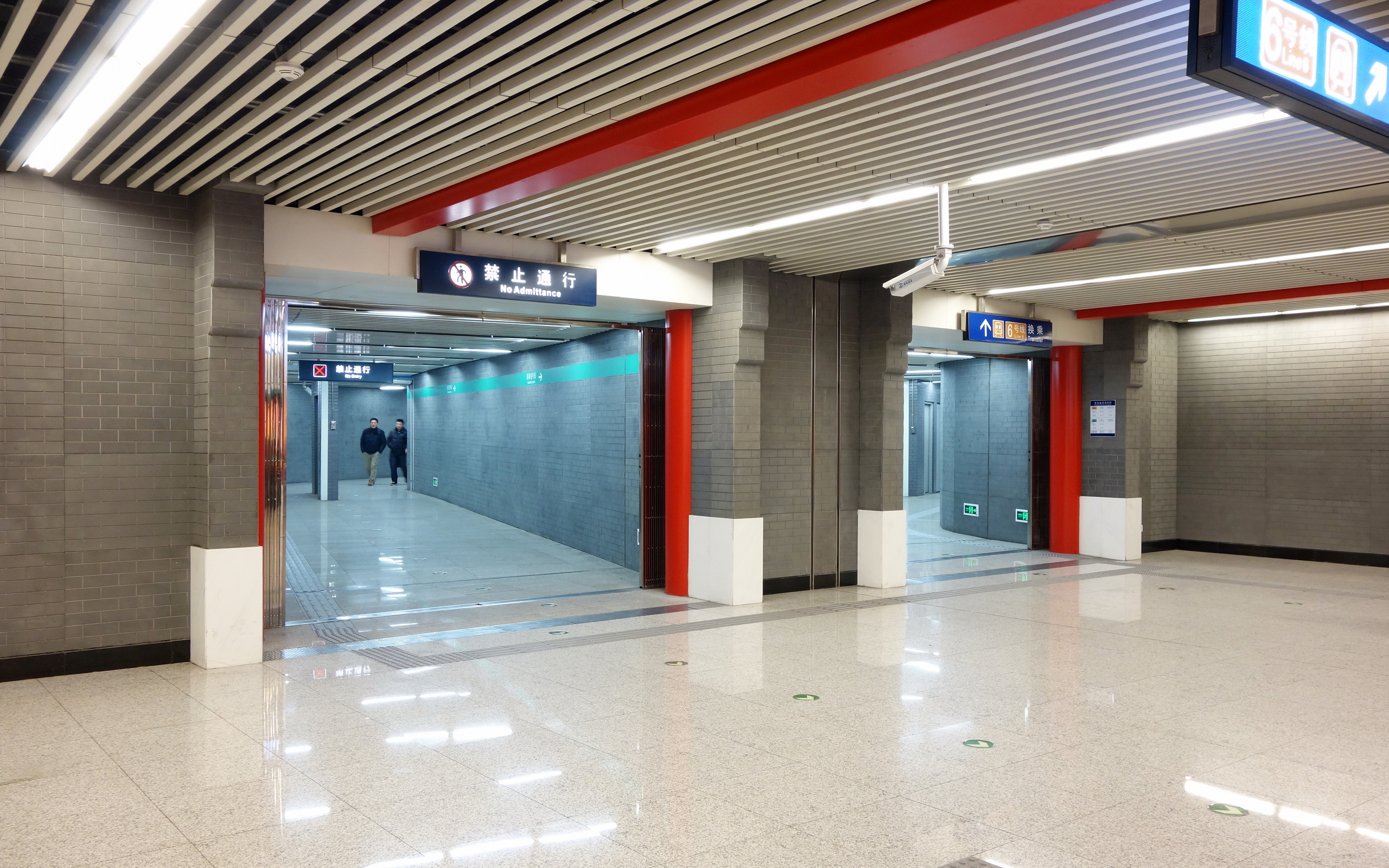
Passage between Line 8 and Line 6
