= Nanluoguxiang =

Street in Beijing, China

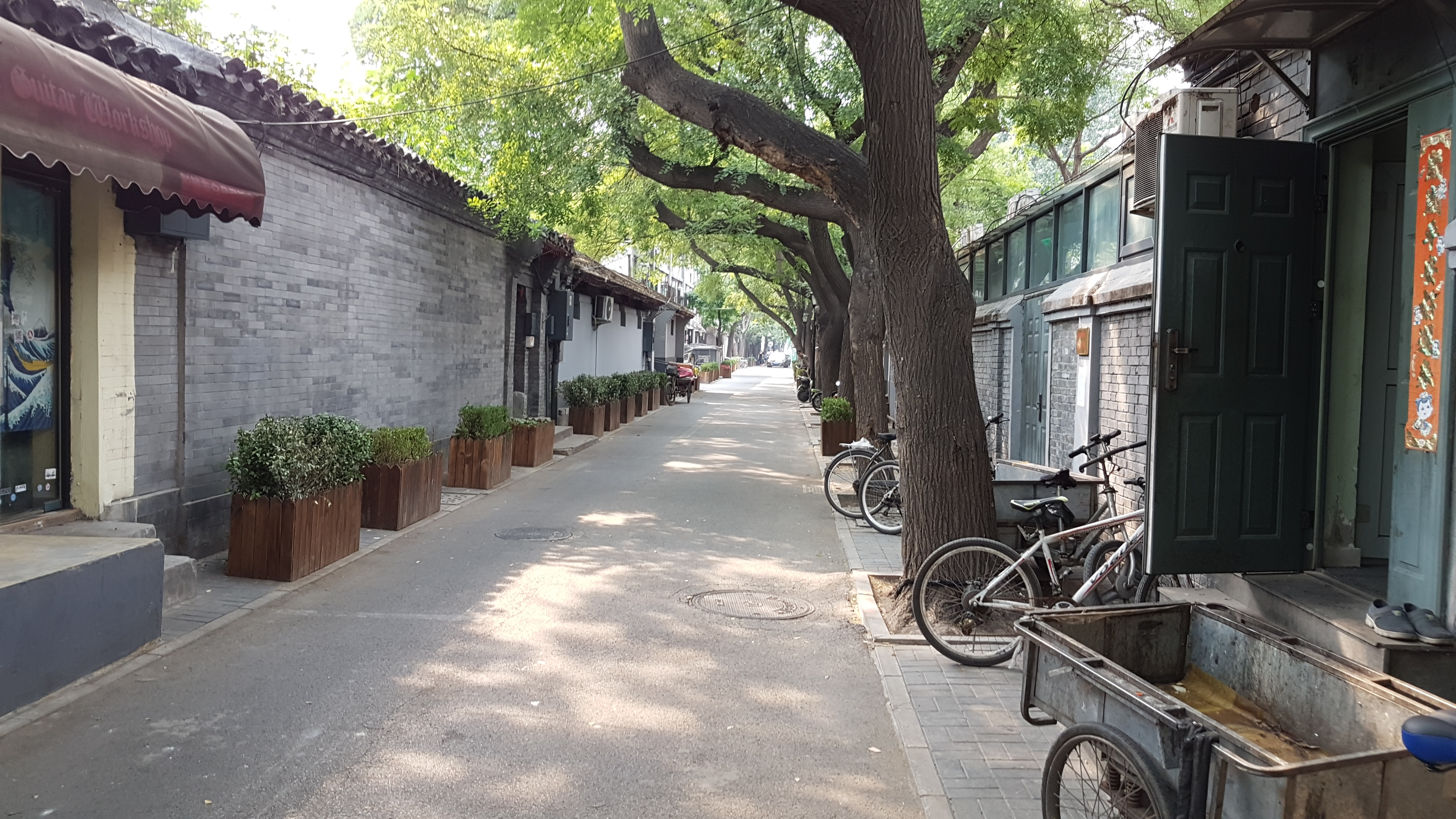
- Nanluoguxiang in 2016
- Interactive map of Nanluoguxiang
- Native name: 南锣鼓巷 (Chinese)
- Type: Hutong
- Length: 800 m (2,600 ft)
- Location: Dongcheng District, Beijing
- Coordinates: 39°56′33″N 116°23′47″E
- North end: Gulou East Street
- South end: Di'anmen East Street

Nanluoguxiang (Chinese: 南锣鼓巷; pinyin: Nán Luógǔ Xiàng; lit. 'South Luogu Lane') is a narrow alley that gives its name to an old part of the Beijing city centre with traditional architecture both new and old. The neighborhood contains many typical narrow streets known as hutong. It is located in the Dongcheng district.

The alley itself is approximately 800 metres (2,600 ft) long, running from Gulou East Street in the north to Di'anmen East Street in the south. Another alley called Beiluoguxiang (Chinese: 北锣鼓巷; pinyin: Běi Luógǔ Xiàng; lit. 'North Luogu Lane') is located nearby.

== History ==
Nanluoguxiang was built in the Yuan Dynasty and received its current name during the Qing Dynasty, around 1750. In recent years, the area's hutongs have become a popular tourist destination with restaurants, bars, live music houses, coffee shops, fast food and souvenir shops, as well as some old siheyuan associated with famous historic and literary figures. Nanluogu Xiang station of Beijing Subway opened in 2012 and is located near the south entrance of the alley.

== Gallery ==
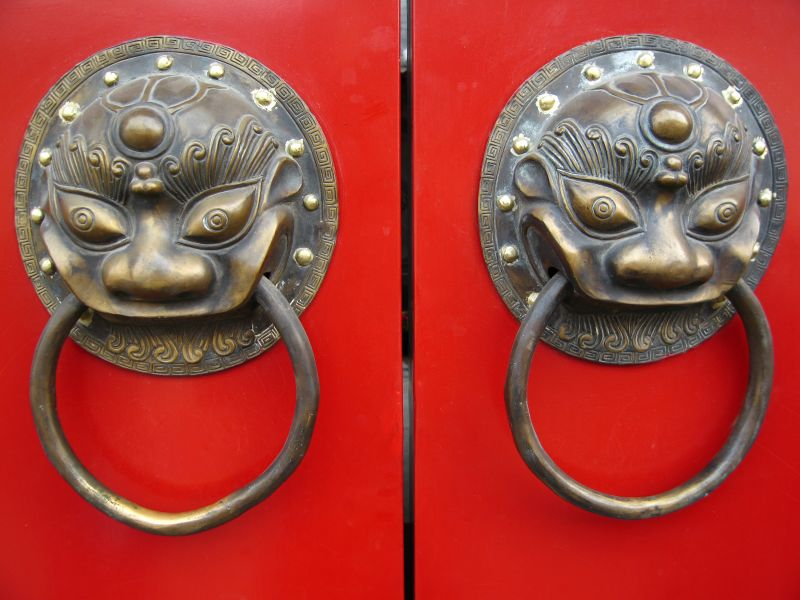
A traditional red Chinese door with Imperial guardian lion knocker resembles the number 8 (good luck or fortune in Chinese culture)

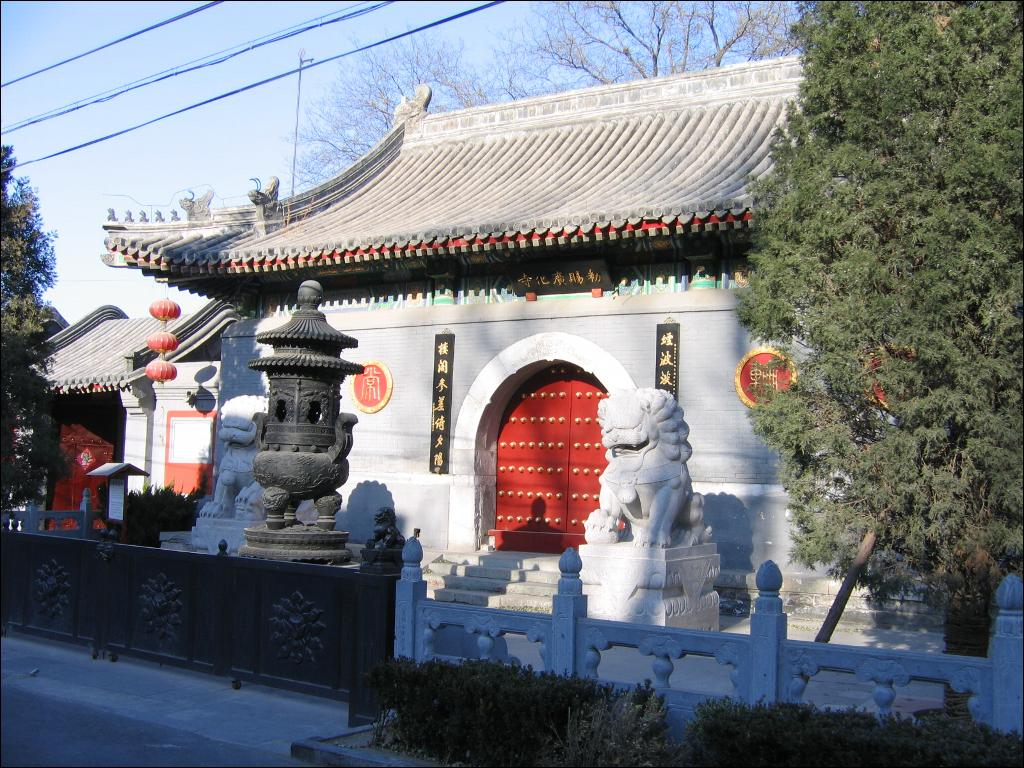
Guanghua Temple (广化寺)

== See also ==
- Nanluogu Xiang station
