= Beihaibei station =

Beijing Subway station

Coordinates: 39°56′00″N 116°23′13″E

Beihaibei 北海北
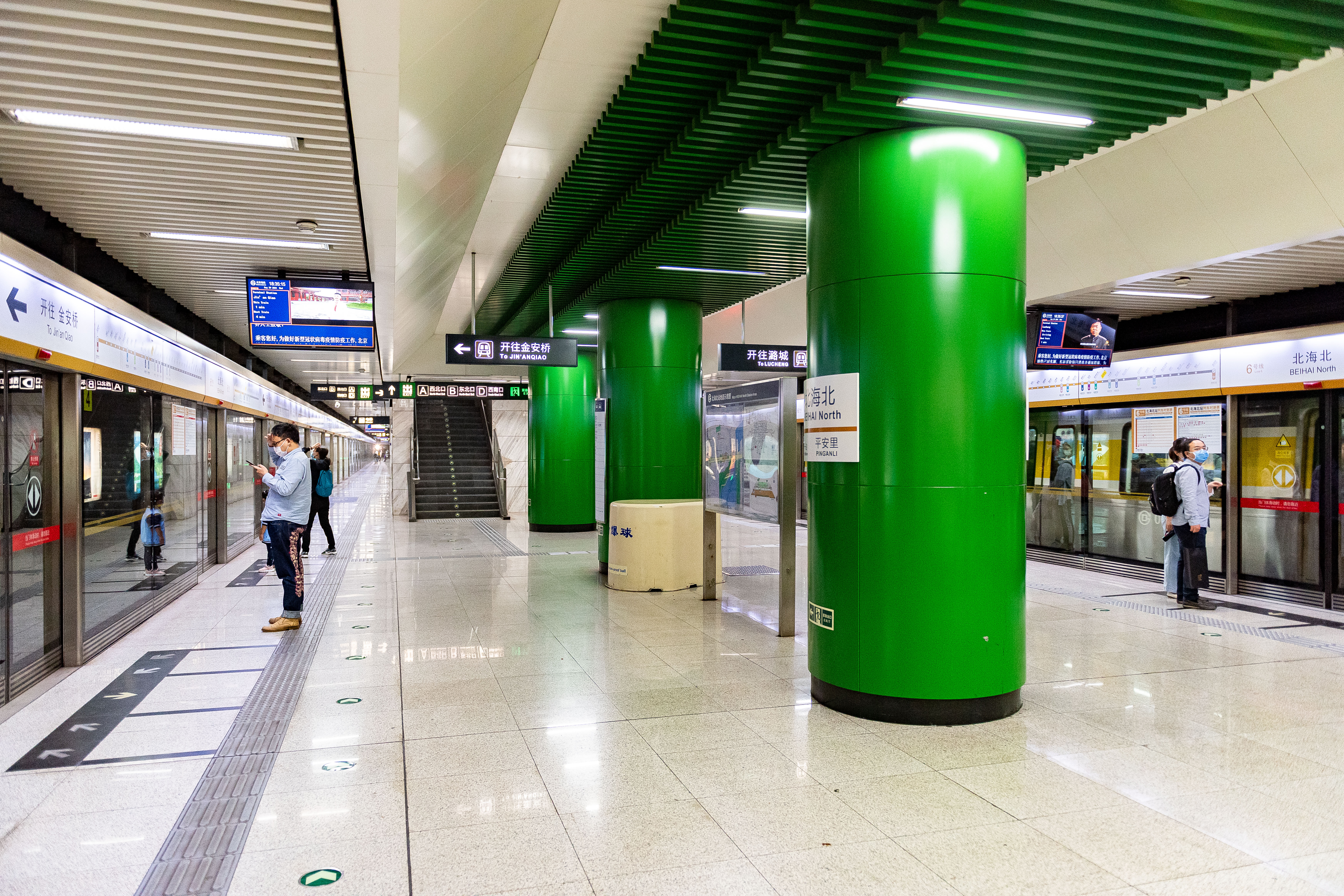
- Platform

General information
- Location: Di'anmen West Street; Xicheng District, Beijing; China
- Operator: Beijing Mass Transit Railway Operation Corporation Limited
- Line: Line 6
- Platforms: 2 (1 island platform)
- Tracks: 2

Construction
- Structure type: Underground
- Accessible: Yes

History
- Opened: December 30, 2012; 13 years ago

Services
Preceding station	Beijing Subway	Following station
Ping'anli towards Jin'anqiao	Line 6	Nanluogu Xiang towards Luyang
Location
- Location within Beijing

Beihaibei (Chinese: 北海北站; pinyin: Běihǎi Běi Zhàn) is a station on Line 6 of the Beijing Subway. This station opened on December 30, 2012. It is named for the nearby Beihai Park.

== Station layout ==
The station has an underground island platform.

== Exits ==
There are 3 exits, lettered A, B, and D. Exit A is accessible.

== Around the station ==
- Office of the Government of the Hong Kong Special Administrative Region in Beijing

== Gallery ==
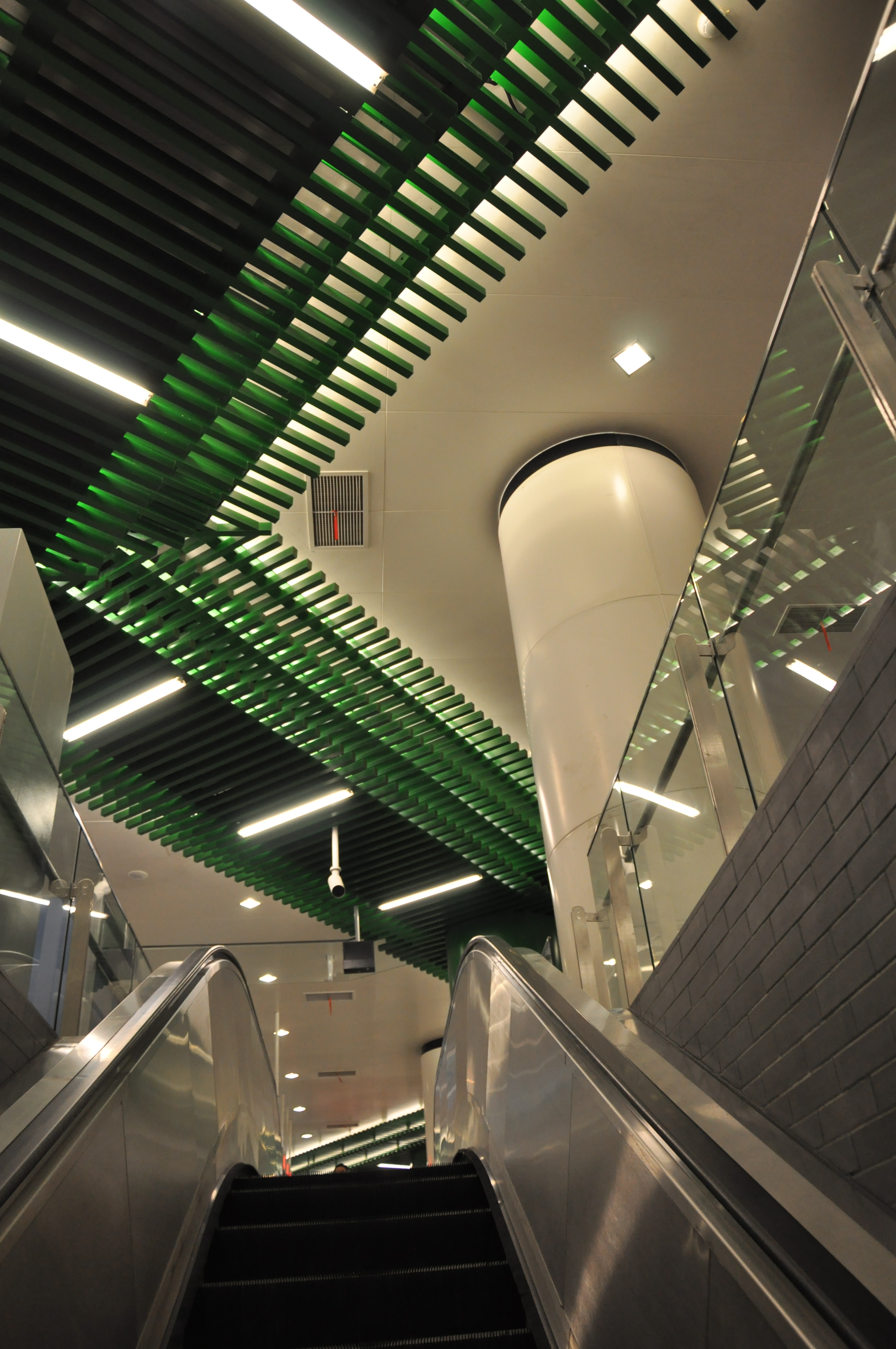
Concourse ceiling

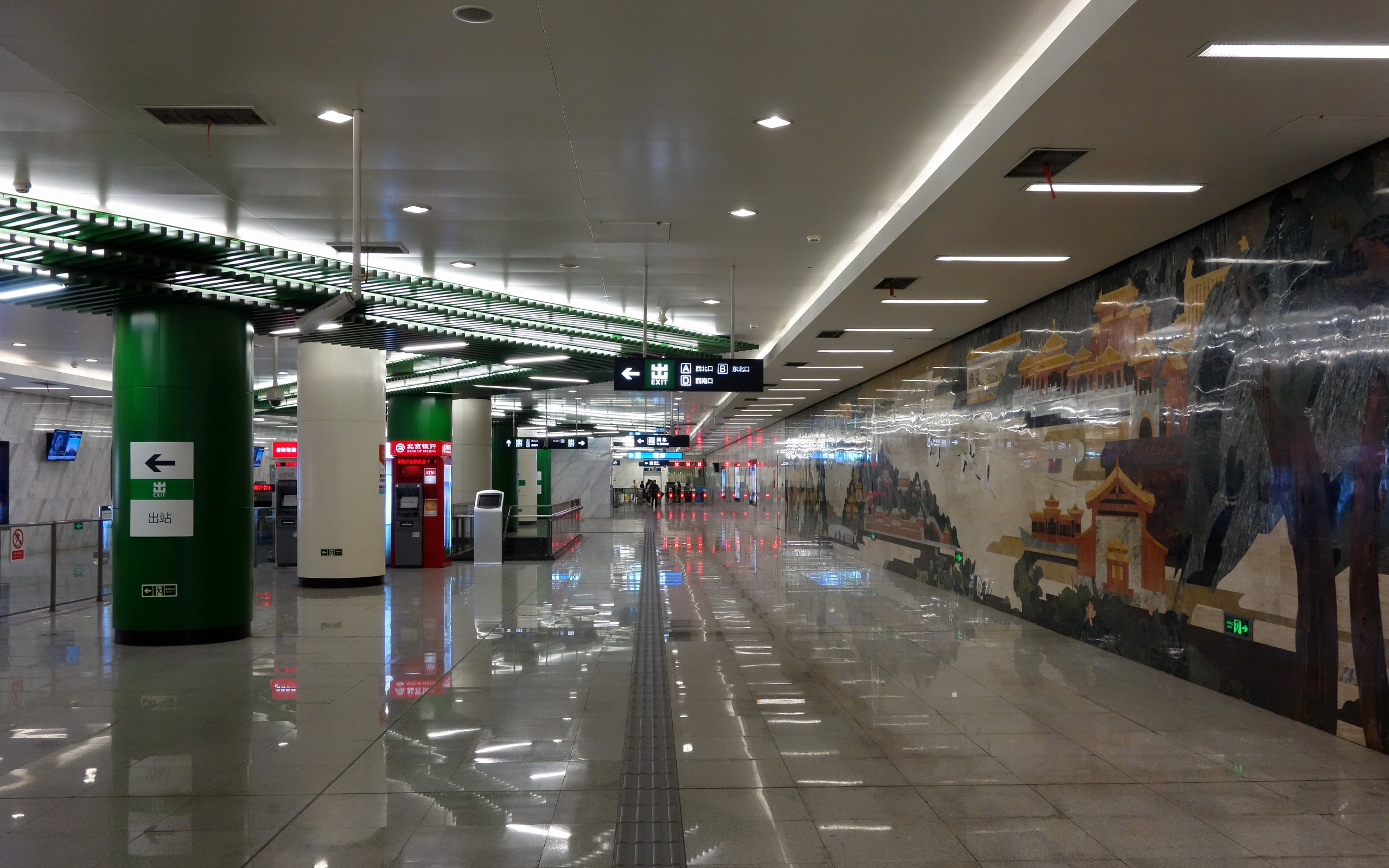
Concourse

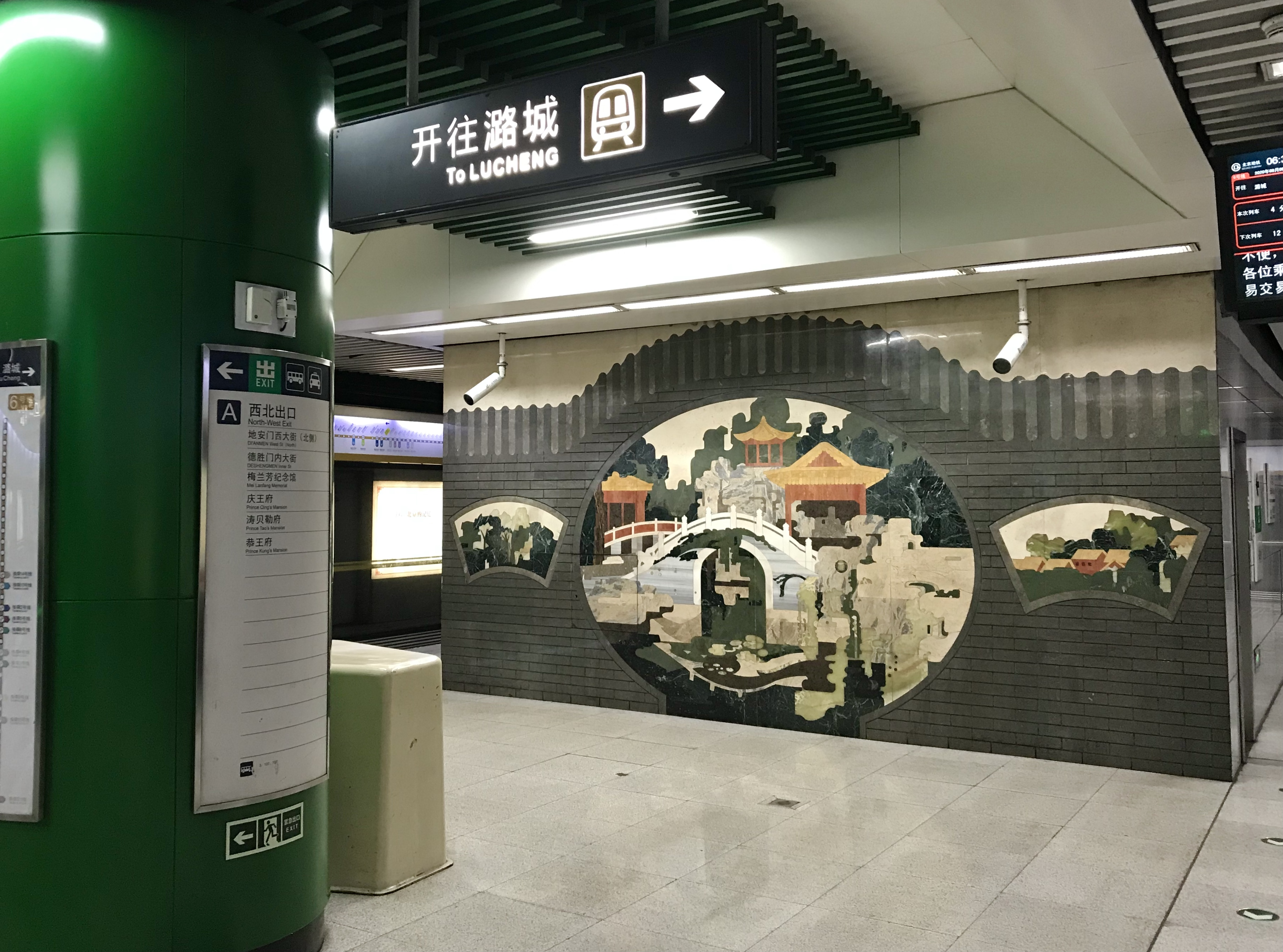
Platform paintings
