= Qianshi Hutong =

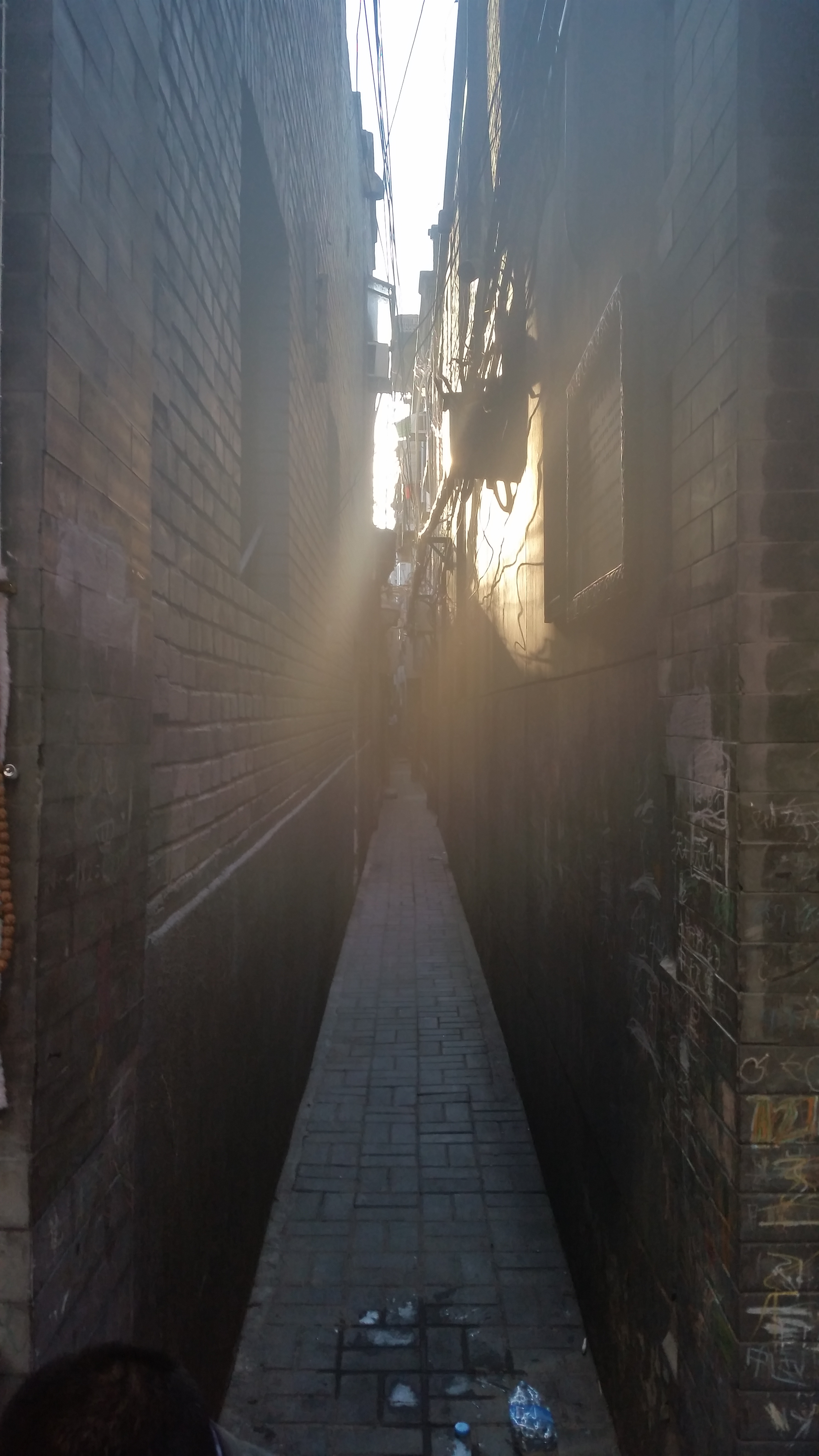
Qianshi Hutong, Beijing, 2015

Qianshi hutong (Chinese: 钱市胡同; pinyin: qiánshì hútong) translated as money market hutong, is a Beijing hutong recognized as the narrowest in the city. The street is located near to Qianmen, in the Dongcheng district. For most of its 55-metre (180 ft) length it is 70-centimetre (2.3 ft) wide and measures 40 centimetres (16 in) at its narrowest point, requiring passersby to turn sideways.

== History ==
During the Qing Dynasty, Qianshi was a financial center of monetary exchange, home to 26 mints producing copper coins for nearly every bank in the city. The lane narrowed as these banks expanded. After the establishment of the People's Republic of China in 1949, the lane lost its function following the reformation of the monetary system and the production of paper currency.
