= Hutong =

Type of narrow street or alley in northern Chinese cities

- Simplified Chinese: 胡同
- Traditional Chinese: 衚衕 or 胡同
- Literal meaning: borrowing of Middle Mongolian quddug ("water well")
Transcriptions
Standard Mandarin
- Hanyu Pinyin: hútòng
- Wade–Giles: hu^{2}-t'ung^{4}
- IPA: [xǔ.tʰʊ̂ŋ]

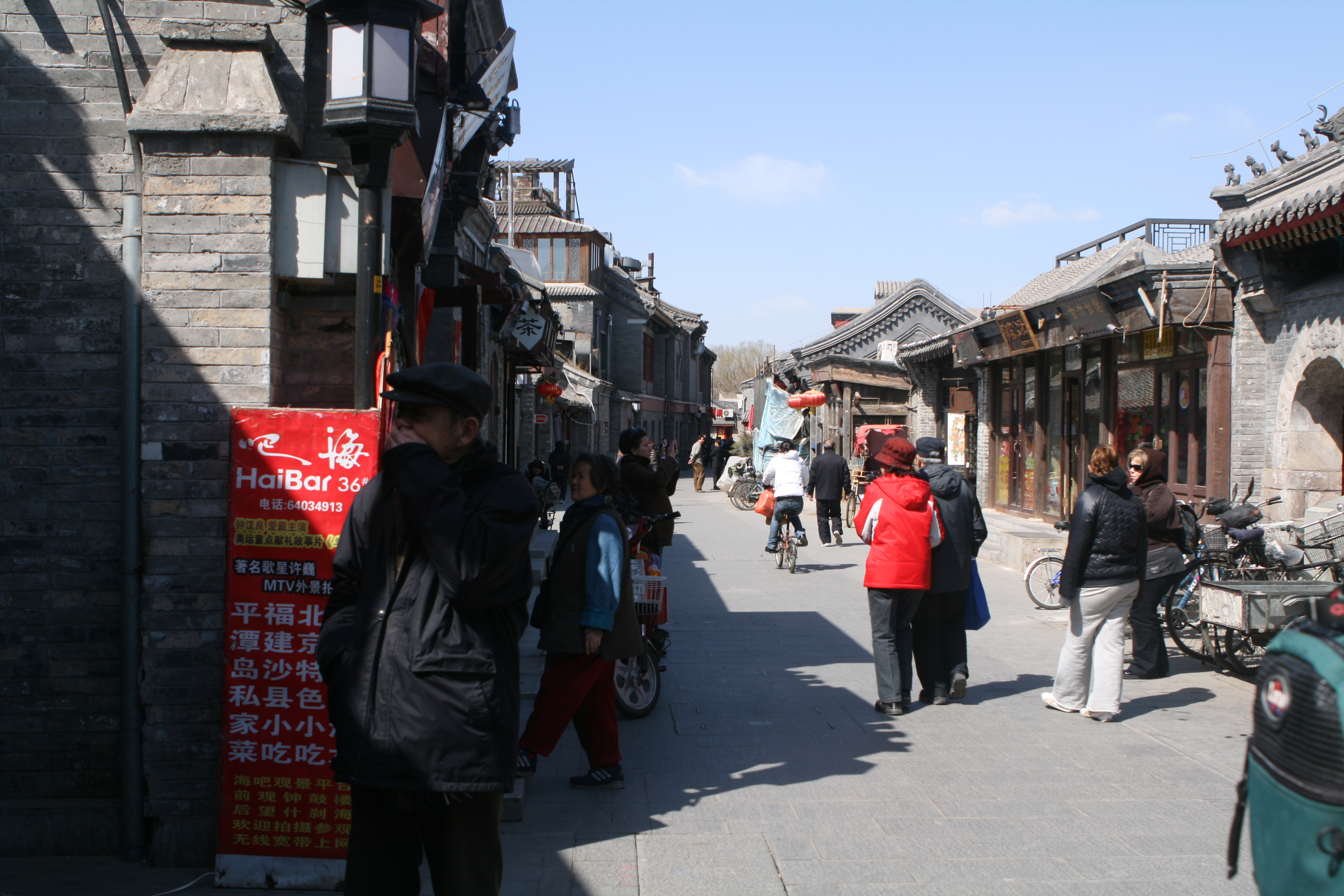
A hutong in Beijing

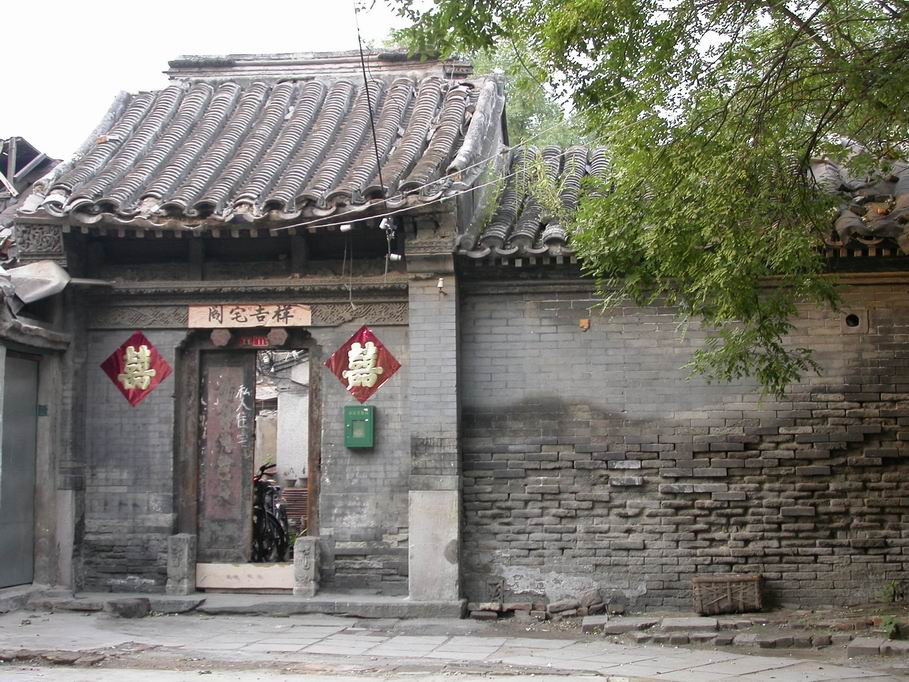
Entrance to a residence in a hutong

Hutong (simplified Chinese: 胡同; traditional Chinese: 衚衕 or 胡同; pinyin: hútòng) are a type of narrow street or alley commonly associated with northern Chinese cities, especially Beijing.

In Beijing, hutongs are alleys formed by lines of siheyuan, traditional courtyard residences. Many neighbourhoods were formed by joining one siheyuan to another to form a hutong, and then joining one hutong to another. The word hutong is also used to refer to such neighbourhoods.

Since the mid-20th century, many Beijing hutongs were demolished to make way for new roads and buildings. More recently, however, many hutongs have been designated as protected, in an attempt to preserve this aspect of Chinese cultural history. Hutongs were first established in the Yuan dynasty (1279–1368) and then expanded in the Ming (1368–1644) and Qing (1644–1911) dynasties.

== Historical hutongs ==
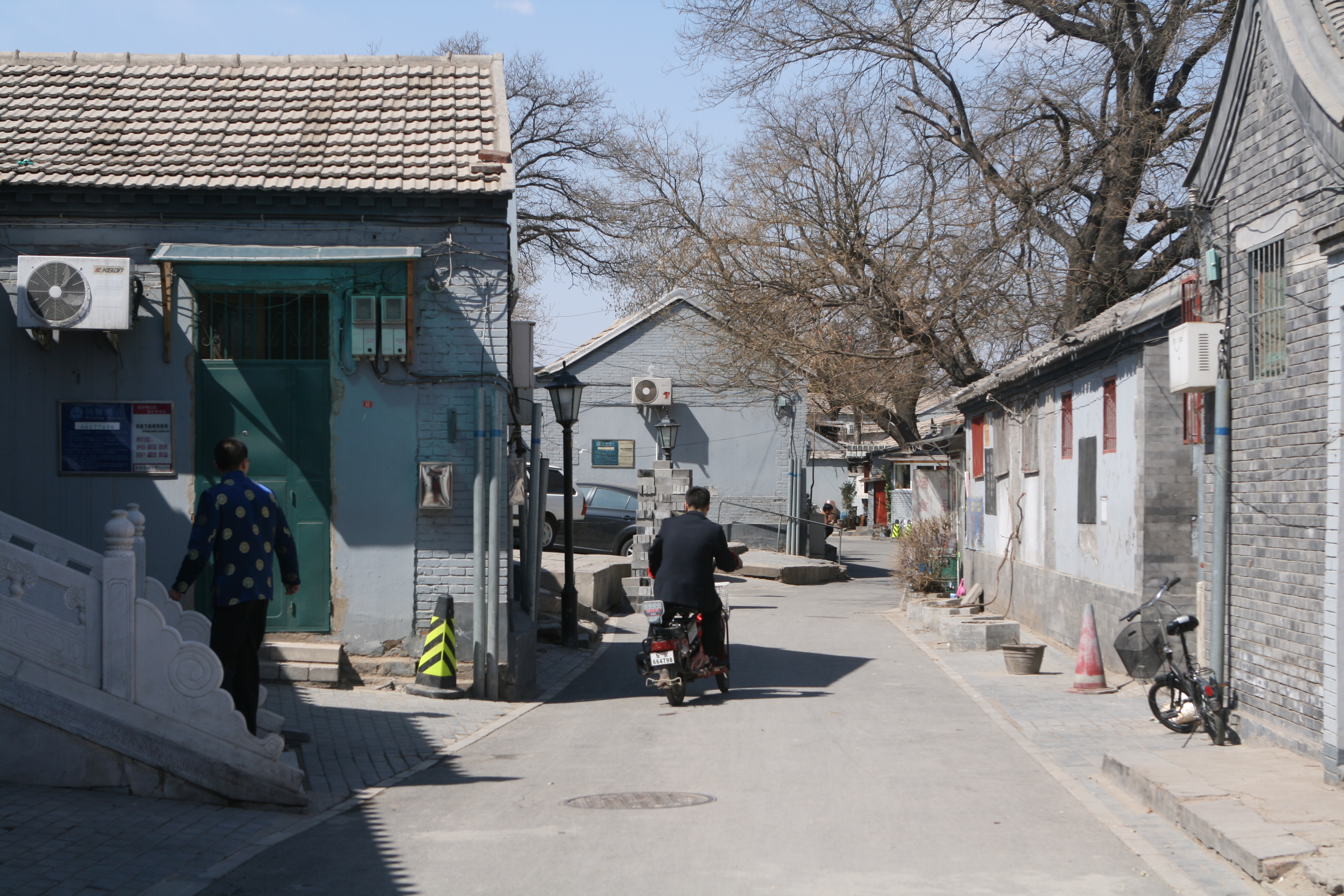
A residential hutong

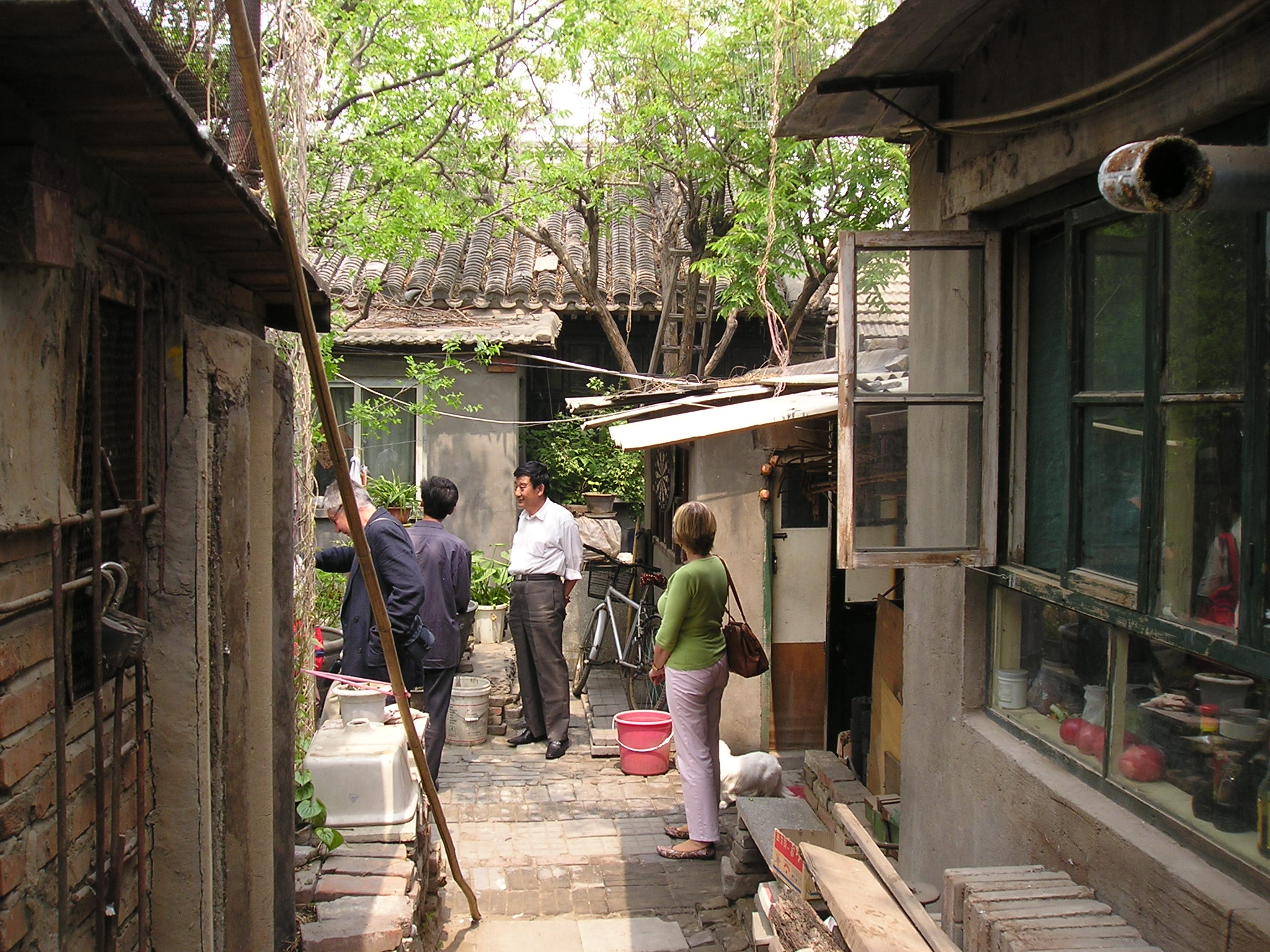
A typical courtyard of a Hutong. On the roof the owner keeps his pigeons

During China's dynastic period, emperors planned the city of Beijing and arranged the residential areas according to the social classes of the Zhou dynasty (1027–256 BC). The term "hutong" appeared first during the Yuan Dynasty, and is a term of Mongolian origin, meaning "water well".

In the Ming Dynasty (early 15th century), the center was the Forbidden City, surrounded in concentric circles by the Inner City and Outer City. Citizens of higher social status were permitted to live closer to the center of the circles. Aristocrats lived to the east and west of the imperial palace. The large siheyuan of these high-ranking officials and wealthy merchants often featured beautifully carved and painted roof beams and pillars and carefully landscaped gardens. The hutongs they formed were orderly, lined by spacious homes and walled gardens. Farther from the palace, and to its north and south, were the commoners, merchants, artisans, and laborers. Their siheyuan were far smaller in scale and simpler in design and decoration, and the hutongs were narrower.

Nearly all siheyuan had their main buildings and gates facing south for better lighting; thus a majority of hutongs run from east to west. Between the main hutongs, many tiny lanes ran north and south for convenient passage.

Historically, a hutong was also once used as the lowest level of administrative geographical divisions within a city in ancient China, as in the paifang (牌坊) system: the largest division within a city in ancient China was a fang (坊), equivalent to current day ward. Each fang (坊) was enclosed by walls or fences, and the gates of these enclosures were shut and guarded every night, somewhat like a modern gated community. Each fang (坊) was further divided into several plate or pai (牌), which is equivalent to a current day (unincorporated) community (or neighborhood). Each pai (牌), in turn, contained an area including several hutongs, and during the Ming Dynasty, Beijing was divided into a total of 36 fangs (坊).

However, as the ancient Chinese urban administration division system gave way to population and household divisions instead of geographical divisions, the hutongs were no longer used as the lowest level of administrative geographical division and were replaced with other divisional approaches.

== In the Republic of China era ==
At the turn of the 20th century, the Qing court was disintegrating as China's dynastic era came to an end. The traditional arrangement of hutongs was also affected. Many new hutongs, built haphazardly and with no apparent plan, began to appear on the outskirts of the old city, while the old ones lost their former neat appearance. The social stratification of the residents also began to evaporate, reflecting the collapse of the feudal system.

Many such hutong-like areas have been demolished. During the period of the Republic of China from 1911 to 1948, society was unstable, fraught with civil wars and repeated foreign invasions. Beijing deteriorated, and the conditions of the hutongs worsened. Siheyuans previously owned and occupied by single families were subdivided and shared by many households, with additions tacked on as needed, built with whatever materials were available. The 978 hutongs listed in Qing Dynasty records swelled to 1,330 by 1949. Today in 2008, in some hutongs, such as those in Da Shi Lan, the conditions remain poor.

== In the People's Republic ==
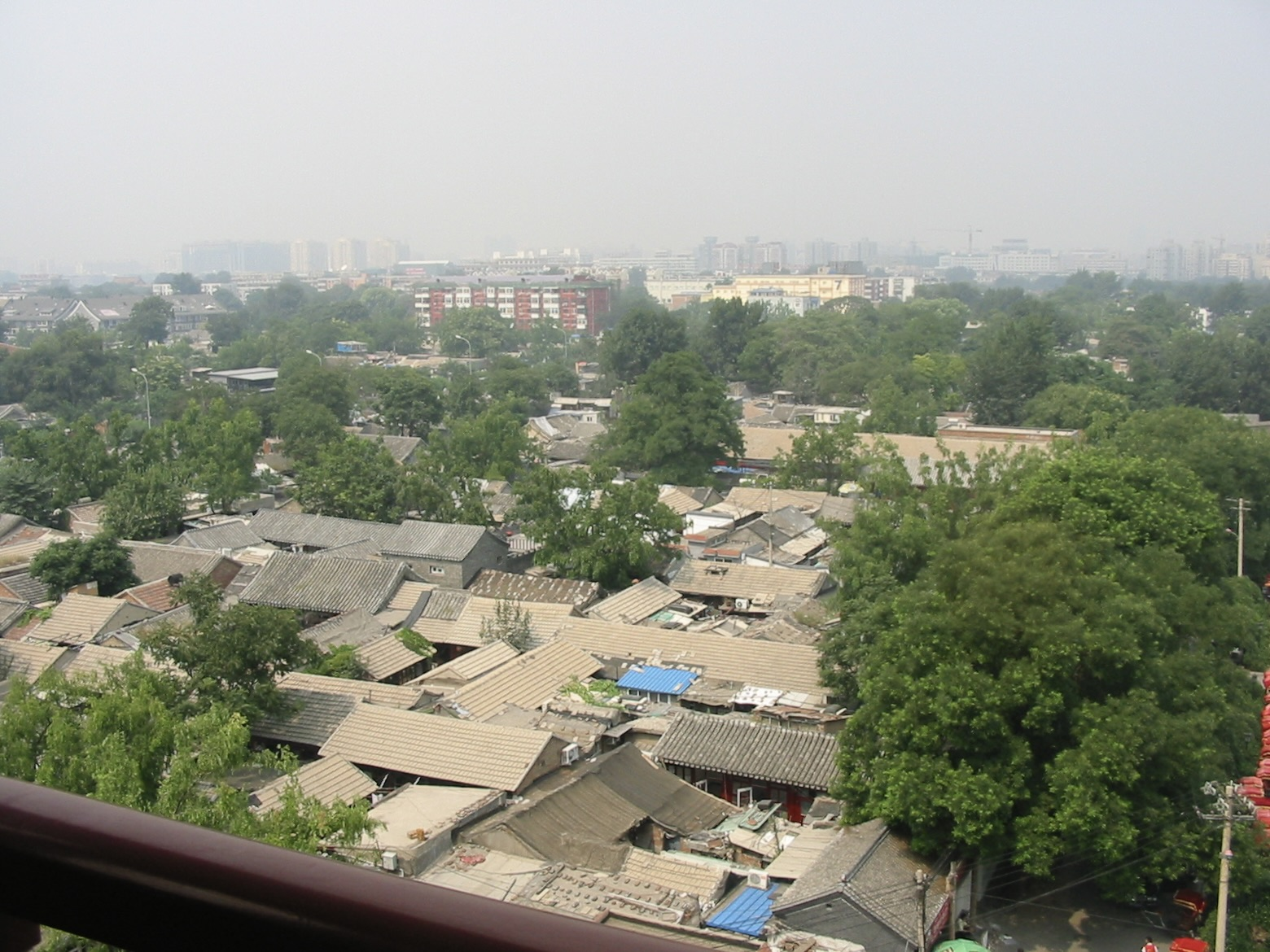
Hutong roofscapes viewed from Drum Tower

As China's urbanization greatly increased, many of Beijing's hutongs were demolished during the period 1989-2019, with remaining lanes often converted into tourist attractions as objects of historic preservation.

Many hutongs, some several hundred years old, in the vicinity of the Bell Tower and Drum Tower and Shichahai Lake are preserved amongst recreated contemporary two- and three-story versions. This area abounds with tourists, many of which tour the quarter in pedicabs.

Today, as in the past, hutongs are home to celebrities, business owners and officials. After the 1989 Tiananmen Square Protests, Zhao Ziyang spent his fifteen years of house arrest inside a hutong. Zhao's hutong had previously been occupied by one of Empress Dowager Cixi's hairdressers.

== Culture ==
Hutongs represent an important cultural element of the city of Beijing. Thanks to Beijing's long history and status as capital for six dynasties, almost every hutong has its anecdotes, and some are even associated with historic events. In contrast to the court life and elite culture represented by the Forbidden City, Summer Palace, and the Temple of Heaven, the hutongs reflect the culture of grassroots Beijingers. The hutongs are residential neighborhoods which still form the heart of Old Beijing.

From 2014 to 2019, an exploration game was played called 胡同谜踪 or Hutong Races. Teams explore hutongs within one city block in detail and complete activities based on art, food, calligraphy, history and technology and often with local businesses.

Each hutong has a name. Some have had only one name since their creation, while others have had several throughout their history.

Many hutongs were named after their location, or a local landmark or business, such as:

- City gates, such as Inner Xizhimen Hutong, indicating this hutong is located in the "Xizhimen Nei", or "Xizhimen Within", neighbourhood, which is on the city side of Xizhimen Gate, a gate on the city wall.
- Markets and businesses, such as Yangshi Hutong (Yangshi literally means sheep market), or Yizi Hutong (a local term for soap is yizi)
- Temples, such as Guanyinsi Hutong (Guanyinsi is the Kuan-yin Temple)
- Local features, such as Liushu Hutong (Liushu means willow), which was originally named "Liushujing Hutong", literally "Willow Tree Well Hutong", after a local well.

Some hutongs were named after people, such as Mengduan Hutong (named after Meng Duan, a mayor of Beijing in the Ming Dynasty whose residence was in this hutong).

Others were given an auspicious name, with words with generic positive attributes, such as Xiqing Hutong (Xiqing means happy)

Hutongs sharing a name, or longer hutongs divided into sections, are often identified by direction. for example, there are three Hongmen Hutong ("Red Gate Hutong"), being the West Hongmen Hutong, the East Hongmen Hutong, and the South Hongmen Hutong (all three hutongs have been obliterated as of 2011 and no longer exist).

While most Beijing hutongs are straight, Jiudaowan Hutong turns nineteen times. Located near Beixinqiao Station, its name 九道弯 literally means "Nine Turns".

At its narrowest section, Qianshi Hutong near Qianmen (Front Gate) is only 40 centimeters wide.

== Gallery ==
Hutongs in Beijing

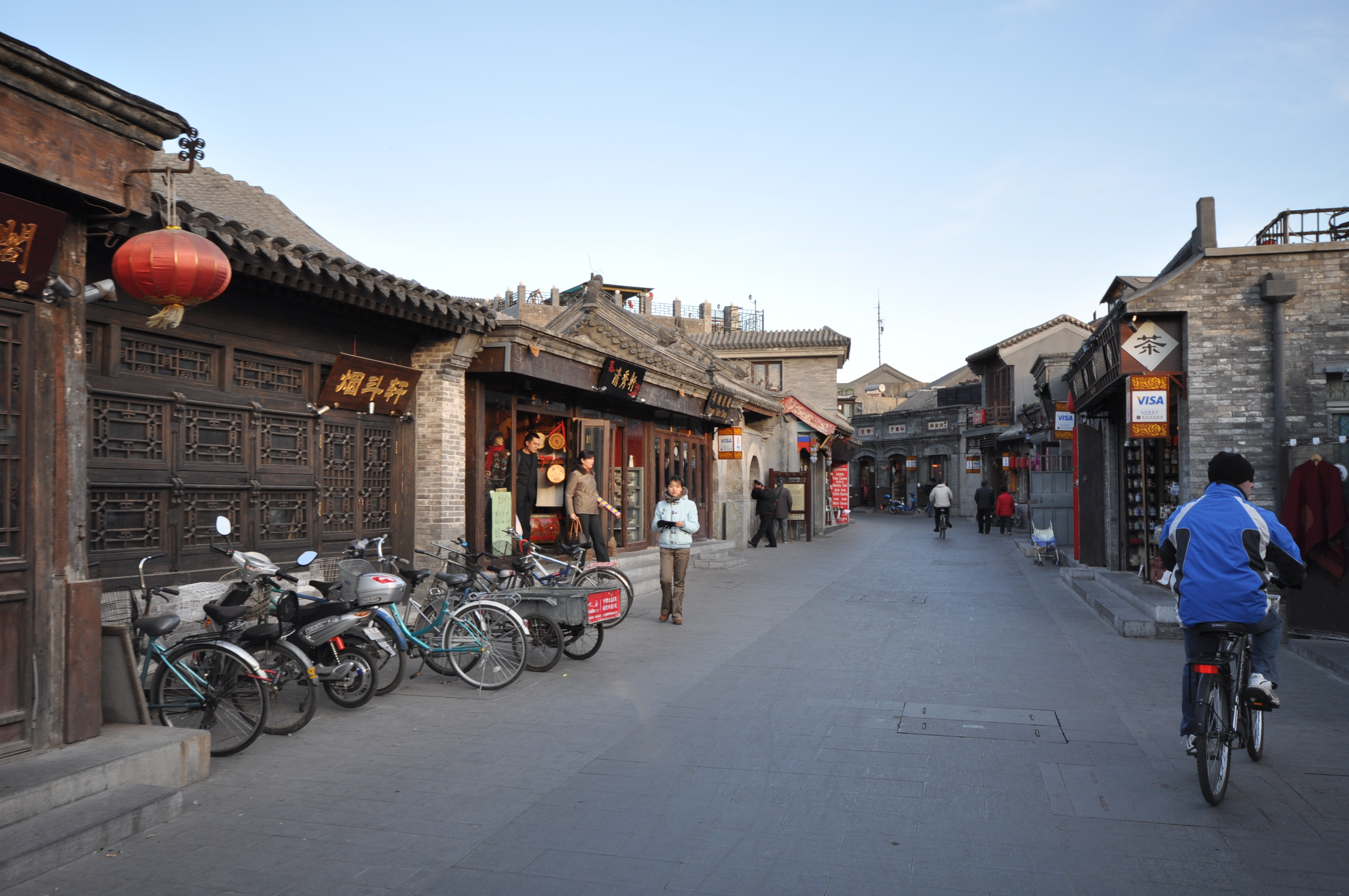

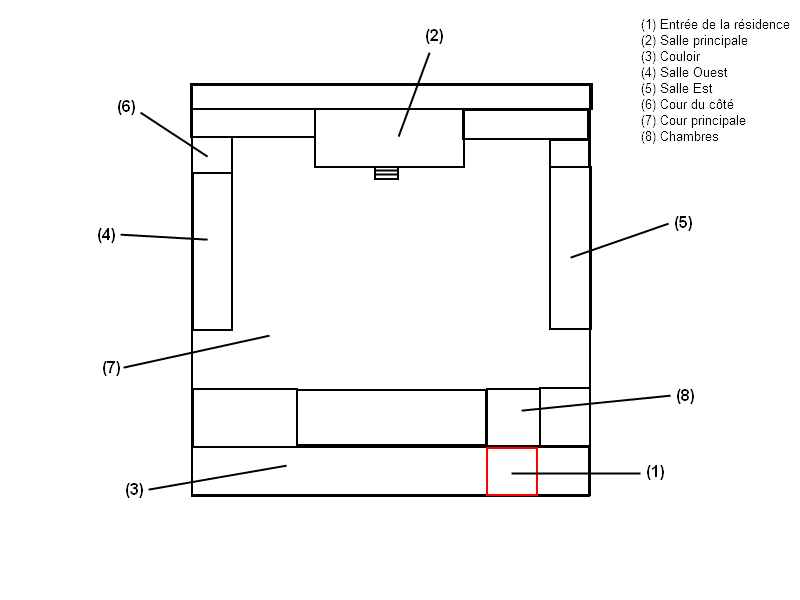
Structural diagram of a siheyuan (in French)

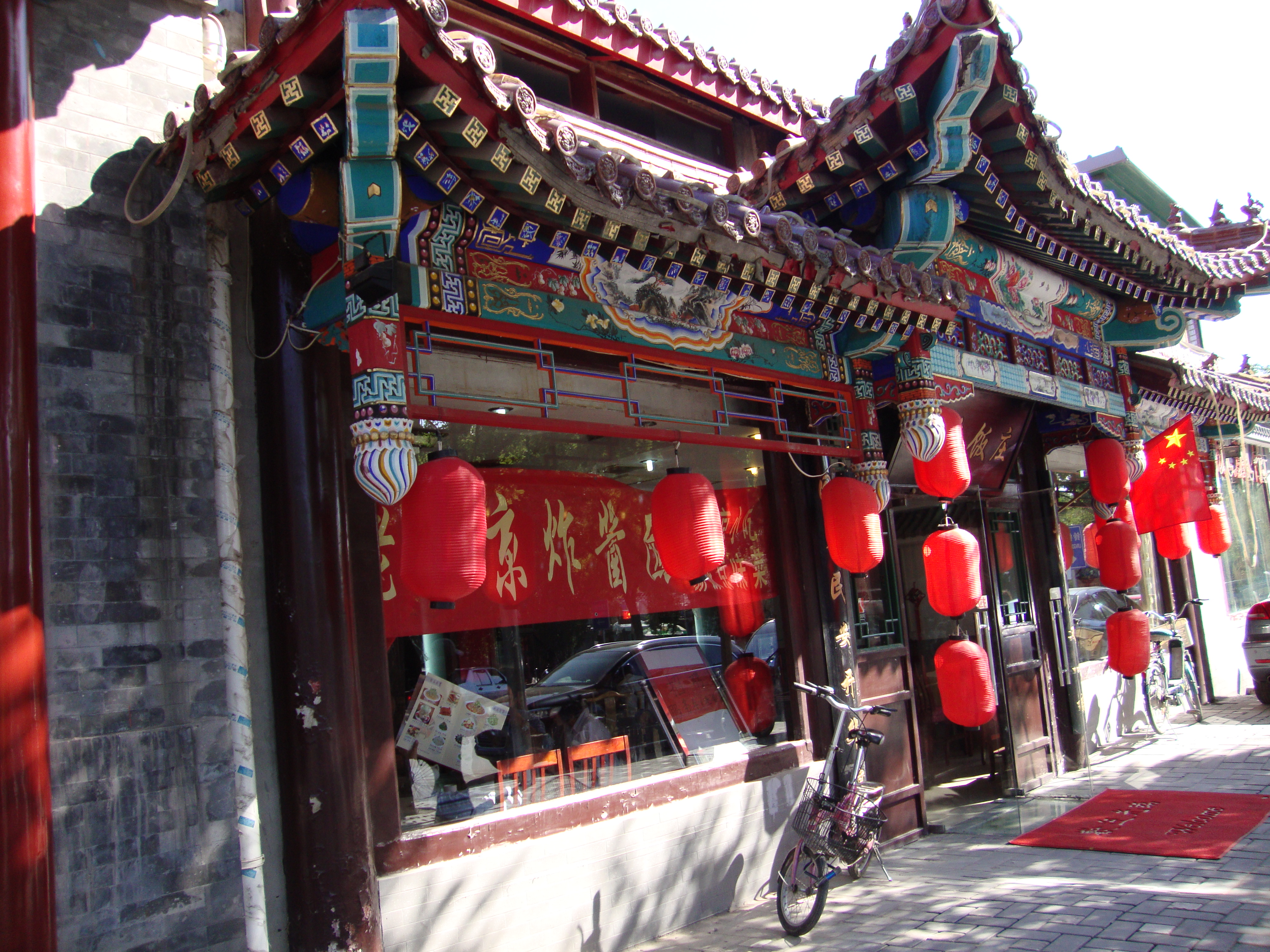
A noodle shop

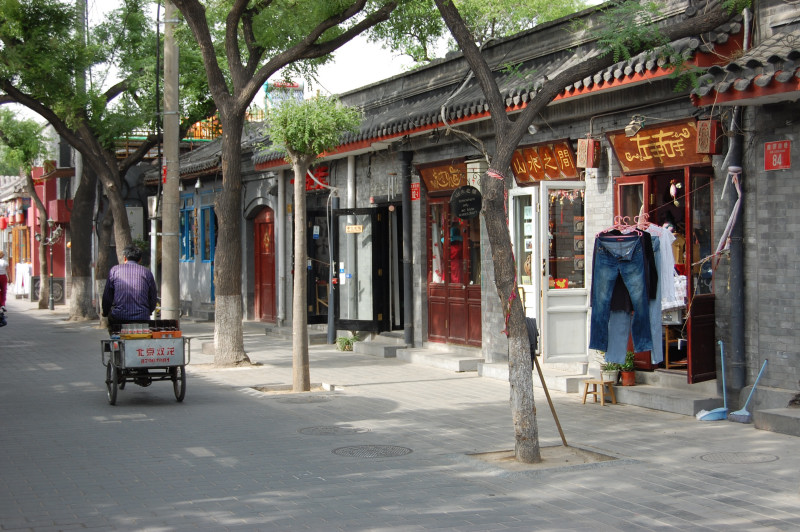

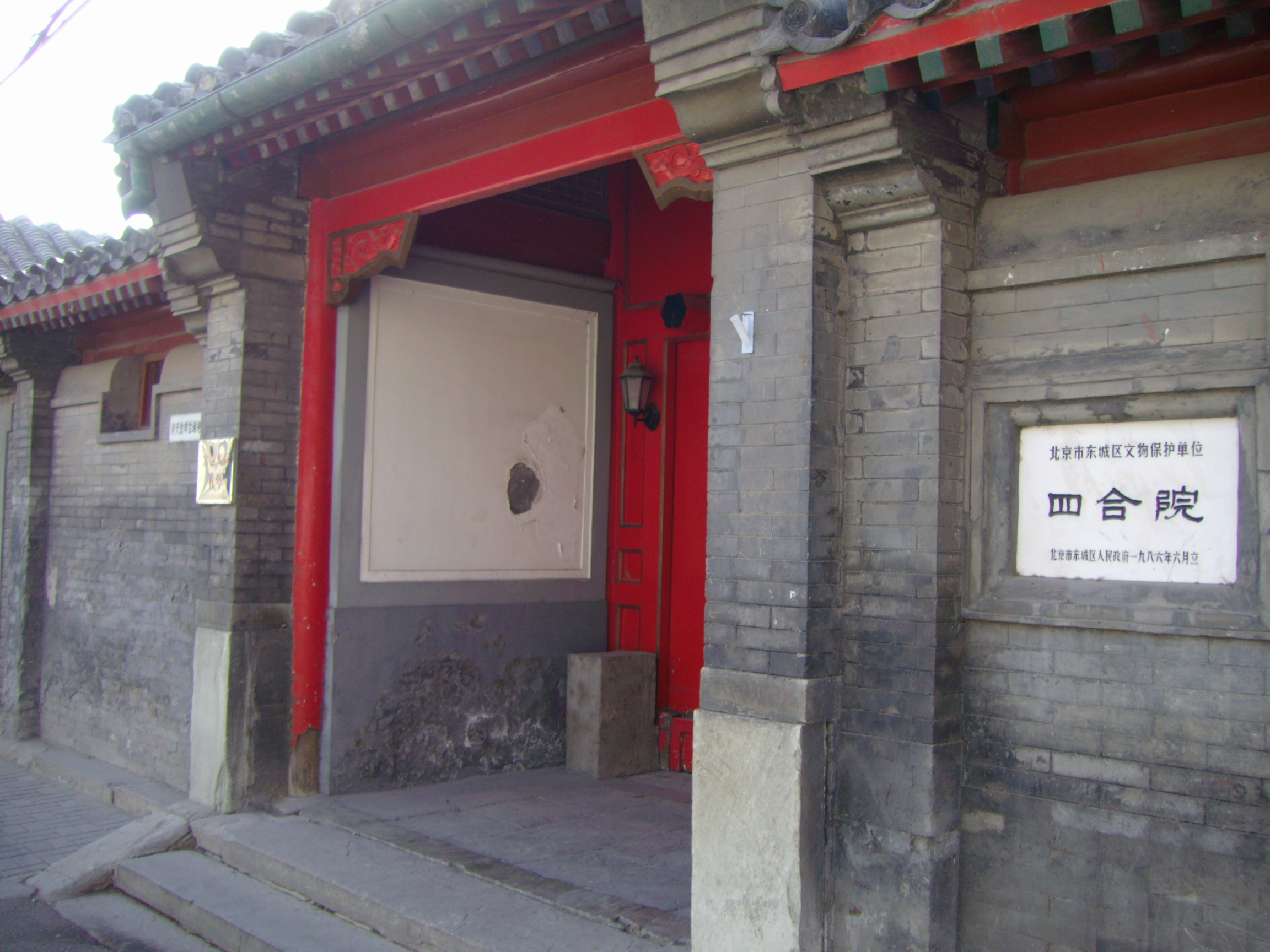
No. 6 Fuqiang Hutong, successively home to two deposed leaders: Zhao Ziyang and Hu Yaobang

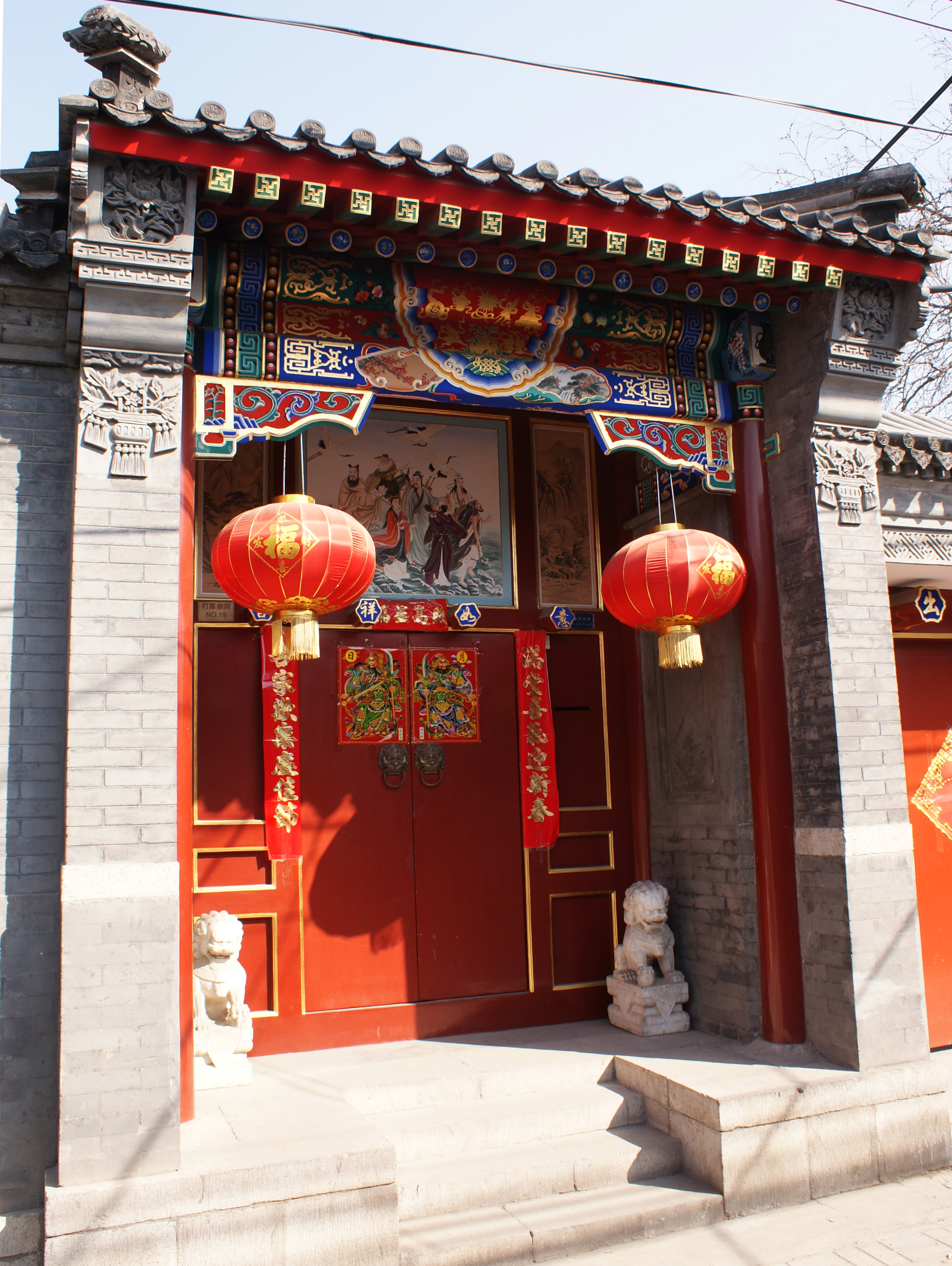

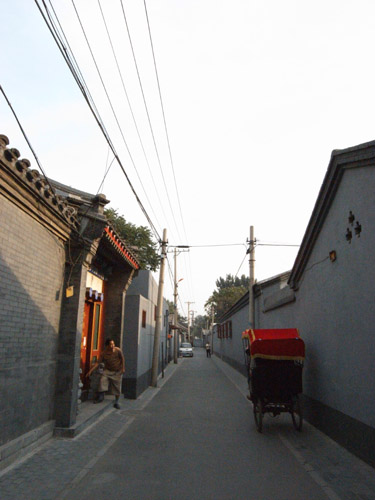

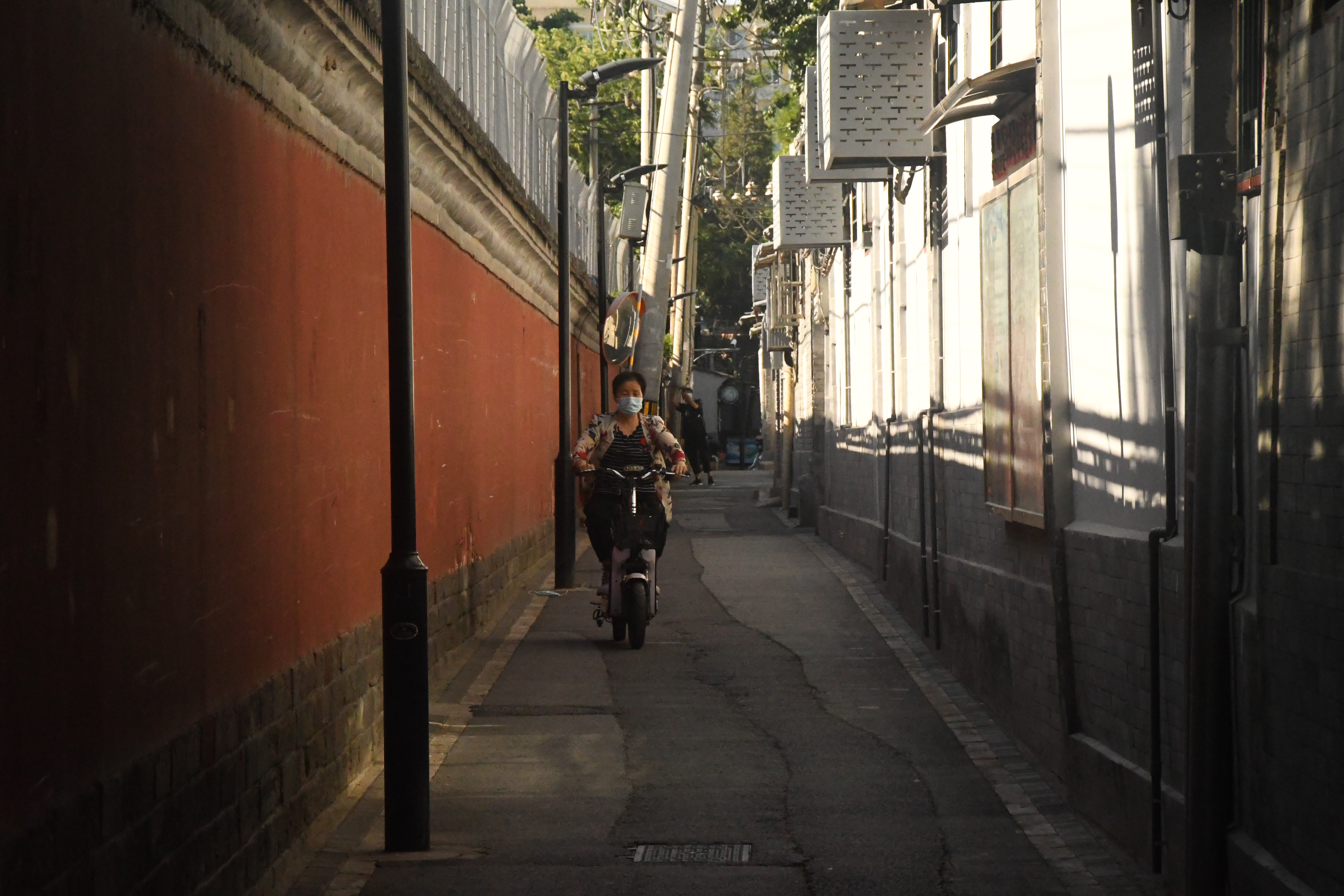
A woman riding a battery car in an alley

== See also ==
- History of Beijing
- List of hutongs in Beijing
- Siheyuan
