= Hepingli Subdistrict, Beijing =

Hepingli Subdistrict 和平里街道
- Subdistrict
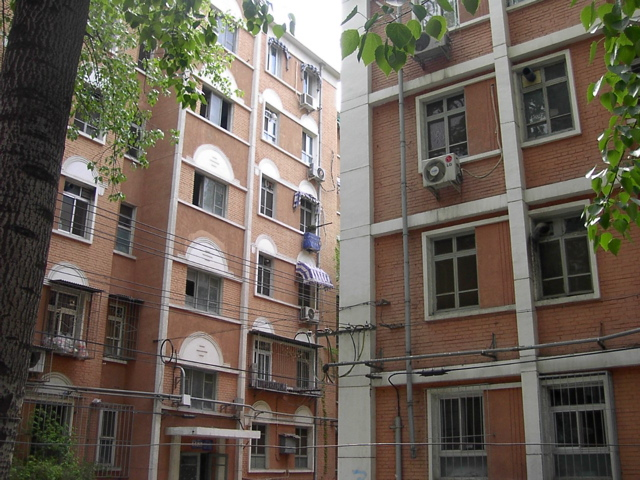
- Residential blocks in Hepingli, 2003

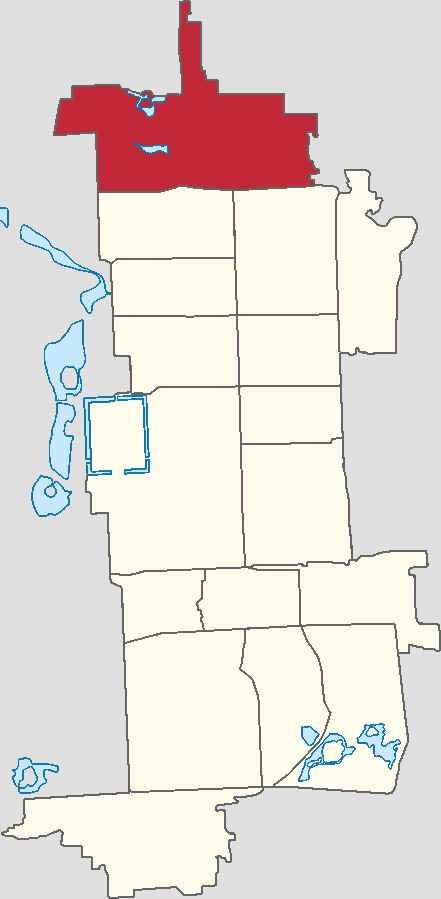
- Location of Hepingli Subdistrict within Dongcheng District

- Location within Beijing Location within China
- Country: China
- Municipality: Beijing
- District: Dongcheng

Area
  - Total: 5.02 km^{2} (1.94 sq mi)

Population (2020)
  - Total: 102,227
  - Density: 20,400/km^{2} (52,700/sq mi)
- Time zone: UTC+8 (China Standard)
- Postal code: 100013
- Area code: 010

Hepingli Subdistrict (Chinese: 和平里街道; pinyin: hépínglǐ jiēdào) is a residential neighborhood and a subdistrict of Dongcheng District, Beijing. It is situated in the northeastern part of the city between the northern 2nd Ring Road and the northern 3rd Ring Road. The neighborhood is bordered by Andingmen Waidajie to the west and Hepingli Dongjie to the east.

Hepingli has 102,227 residents in 2020, and comprises 20 residential areas (社区) or zones. Most apartment buildings were built in the 1950s to 1960s. In the early 2000s, most buildings were repainted.

== History and Name ==
Heplingli, meaning "a place of peace", was named in 1952 during the Asia and Pacific Rim Peace Conference which was held in Beijing.

Below is a table summarizing the changes in the administrative status of the land within Hepingli:

Year	Status
1912	Part of North Suburban District
1949	Part of Dongcheng District. Two street governments were formed: Andingmenwai Dajie Yijie and Andingmenwai Dajie Erjie
1952	The two were merged to create Andingmenwai Dajie Street Government
1953	Street Government was changed to Street Office
1955	Redrawn to two subdistricts: Anwai Zhazipo and Hepingli
1958	Merged into Hepingli Subdistrict
1960	Changed to a commune
1990	Reverted back to a subdistrict

== Administrative Division ==
As of 2021, there are 20 communities within the subdistrict:

Administrative Division Code	Community Name in English	Community Name in Simplified Chinese
110101010003	Minwang	民旺
110101010008	Andelu	安德路
110101010009	Erqu	二区
110101010011	Qiqu	七区
110101010013	Huagong	化工
110101010014	Andeli	安德里
110101010015	Xinghua	兴化
110101010016	Rendinghu	人定湖
110101010017	Xiaohuangzhuang	小黄庄
110101010018	Zongzheng	总政
110101010019	Anzhenyuan	安贞苑
110101010020	Ditan	地坛
110101010021	Huangsi	黄寺
110101010022	Xinjianlu	新建路
110101010023	Dongheyan	东河沿
110101010024	Xiheyan	西河沿
110101010026	Qingnianhu	青年湖
110101010027	Hepingli	和平里
110101010028	Jiaolin	交林
110101010029	Shanglong	上龙

== Transportation ==
Hepingli is served by Lines 5 and 13 of the Beijing Subway. Line 5 traverses the neighborhood from north to south with stops at Heping West Bridge and Hepingli Beijie. Line 13 stops near eastern Hepingli at Liufang.

Main city bus routes through Hepingli include 13, 18, 62, 75, 104, 108, 116, 117, 119, 124, 125, 127, 407, 430, and 特16.

The Heping West and East Bridges on the 3rd Ring Road are named after Heplingli. The Hepingli Railway Station was replaced by the Liufang Station of the Line 13. The area has an expressway link—the Jingcheng Expressway connects to Hepingli at Taiyanggong Bridge.

== Landmarks ==
- Temple of Earth
- Qingnianhu Park

== See also ==
- List of township-level divisions of Beijing
