= Wudaokou =

Neighborhood in Beijing

Coordinates: 39°59′29.50″N 116°19′50.69″E

- Simplified Chinese: 五道口
- Traditional Chinese: 五道口
Transcriptions
Standard Mandarin
- Hanyu Pinyin: Wǔdàokǒu

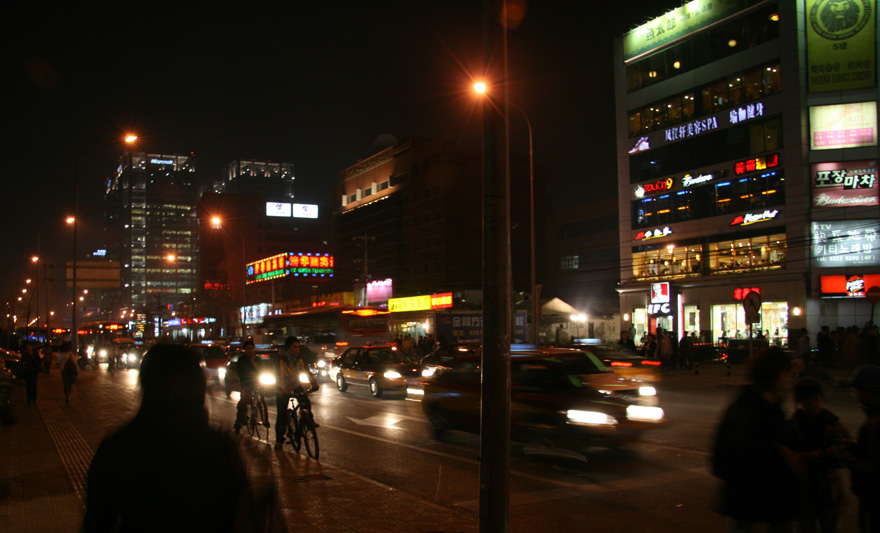
The popular student hangout, Wudaokou, in northwestern Beijing at night

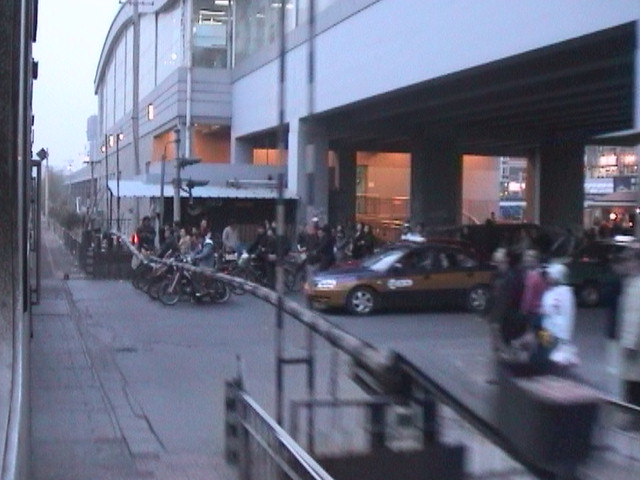
The (former) railway crossing under the Wudaokou subway station, click for animation

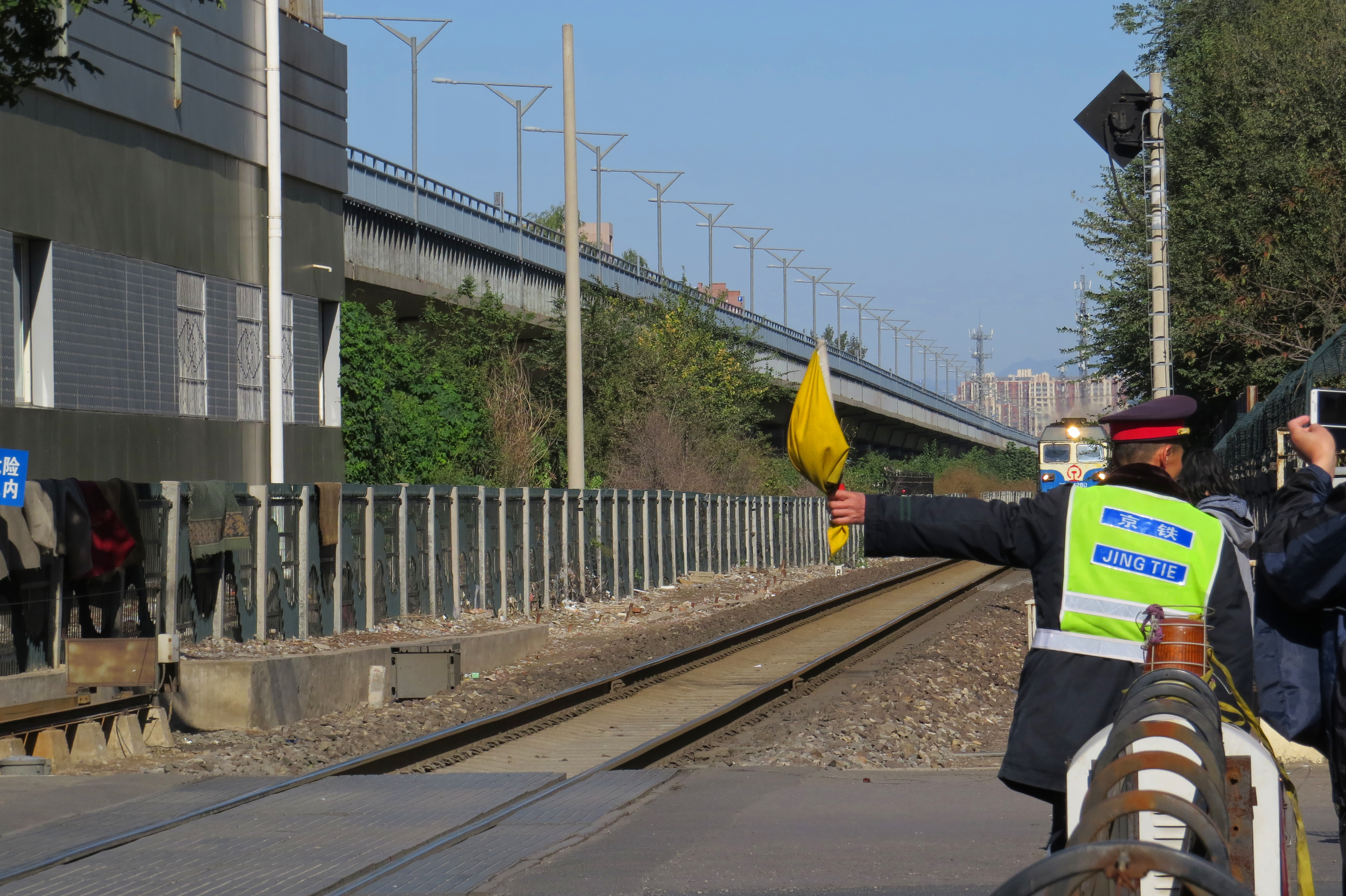
A train ready to pass Wudaokou on the last day of operation for the surface level railway line

Wudaokou (Chinese: 五道口), whose name is a literal reference to the fifth level crossing of the Jingbao Railway, is a neighborhood in the Haidian District of North West Beijing, famous for its close distances to universities including Tsinghua University and Peking University.

It is around 10 km (6.2 mi) from the center of Beijing, between the Fourth and Fifth ring roads, and has good public transport links including a station on Line 13 of the Beijing Subway.

It became a commercial center in Haidian during the 1950s following the establishment of several universities. The high price of real estate in this area has led to it being dubbed the "Center of the Universe (宇宙中心)."

Until as recently as 2001 the area consisted mainly of Hutong neighborhoods and late 1960s apartment blocks, but major development has erased many of these old structures, replacing them with luxury apartments and technology parks. Some may also refer to Wudaokou as Koreatown, for the large number of Koreans in the area.

== Location ==
Wudaokou is close to a large number of universities and research institutes, including Tsinghua University, Beijing Language and Culture University, Beihang University, Peking University, China University of Geosciences, University of Science and Technology Beijing, and Beijing Forestry University, and as such has a large student population. Google China used to have an office here.

Wudaokou is also known for its large number of international students. Wudaokou's popularity as an international student area is reflected in its large number of bars and nightclubs (including Wu Club, Global Club, Sugar Shack, Lush, Sensation and Propaganda), which generally offer cheaper prices than many similar clubs in more central areas, such as Sanlitun. The Wudaokou area is also notable for its large number of Koreans, with many signs in Korean advertising businesses, restaurants and bars located within its vicinity. Korean students make up the largest foreign student population.

While centrally located along Beijing's Line 13 subway, the 2-lane in each direction Chengfu Lu (Chengfu Road), which runs east–west under an elevated rapid transit line, suffers from severe traffic congestion problems regardless of rush hour primarily because of heavy foot traffic due to subway users, and because it is the only route connecting the Eastern and Western sides of Wudaokou across the railway corridor. Congestion has improved since the under-grounding of the heavy rail line as part of the Beijing–Zhangjiakou intercity railway project, which eliminated the level crossing from which Wudaokou draws its name.

== Korean population ==
Prior to the 2000s the Wudaokou area was the most popular area for South Koreans. It was the oldest of the major Korean settlements. Beginning in the early 1990s South Korean students who were studying Chinese for one to two year periods so they could enter Chinese universities began congregating in Wudaokou. The growth of Wangjing in Chaoyang District had weakened Wudaokou as a Korean area.

== See also ==
- List of places referred to as the Center of the Universe
