= Bei Yuan station =

Beijing Subway station

Bei Yuan 北苑
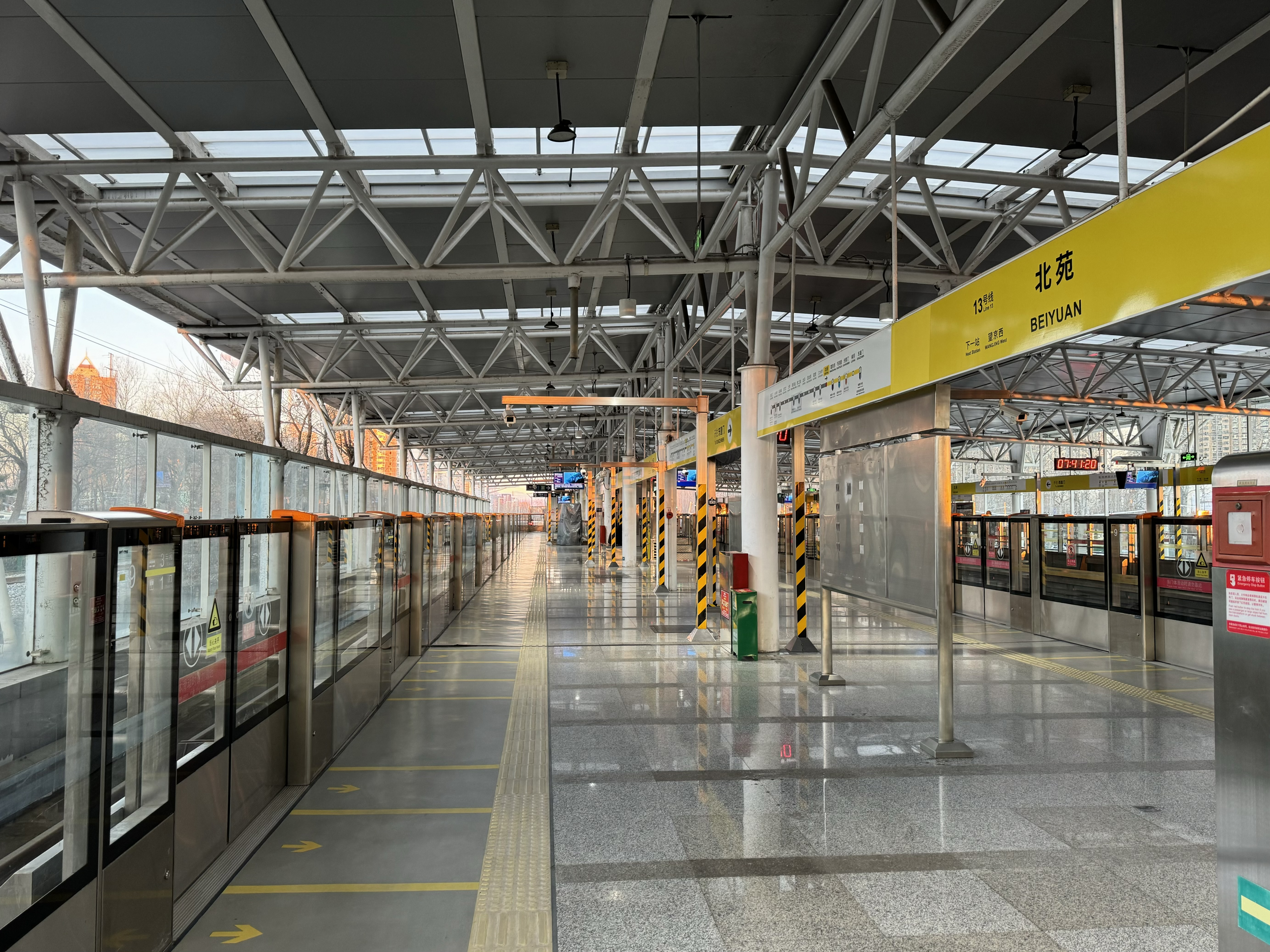
- Eastbound platform

General information
- Location: Chaoyang District, Beijing; China
- Coordinates: 40°02′35″N 116°26′04″E
- Operator: Beijing Mass Transit Railway Operation Corporation Limited
- Line: Line 13
- Platforms: 3 (1 island platform and 1 side platform)
- Tracks: 3

Construction
- Structure type: At-grade
- Accessible: Yes

Other information
- Station code: 1311

History
- Opened: January 28, 2003; 23 years ago

Services
Preceding station	Beijing Subway	Following station
Lishui Qiao towards Xizhimen	Line 13	Wangjingxi towards Dongzhimen
Location
- Location within Beijing

Bei Yuan (Chinese: 北苑站; pinyin: Běi Yuàn Zhàn) is a station on Line 13 of the Beijing Subway.

== History ==
Bei Yuan station opened on 28 January 2003. The installation of automatic platform gates started on 9 August 2012 and was completed in September 2012.

== Station layout ==
The station has an at-grade island and side platform. The outer island platform is not in service.

== Exits ==
There is one exit, lettered A, which is accessible.
