= Wudao Kou station =

Beijing Subway station

Wudao Kou 五道口
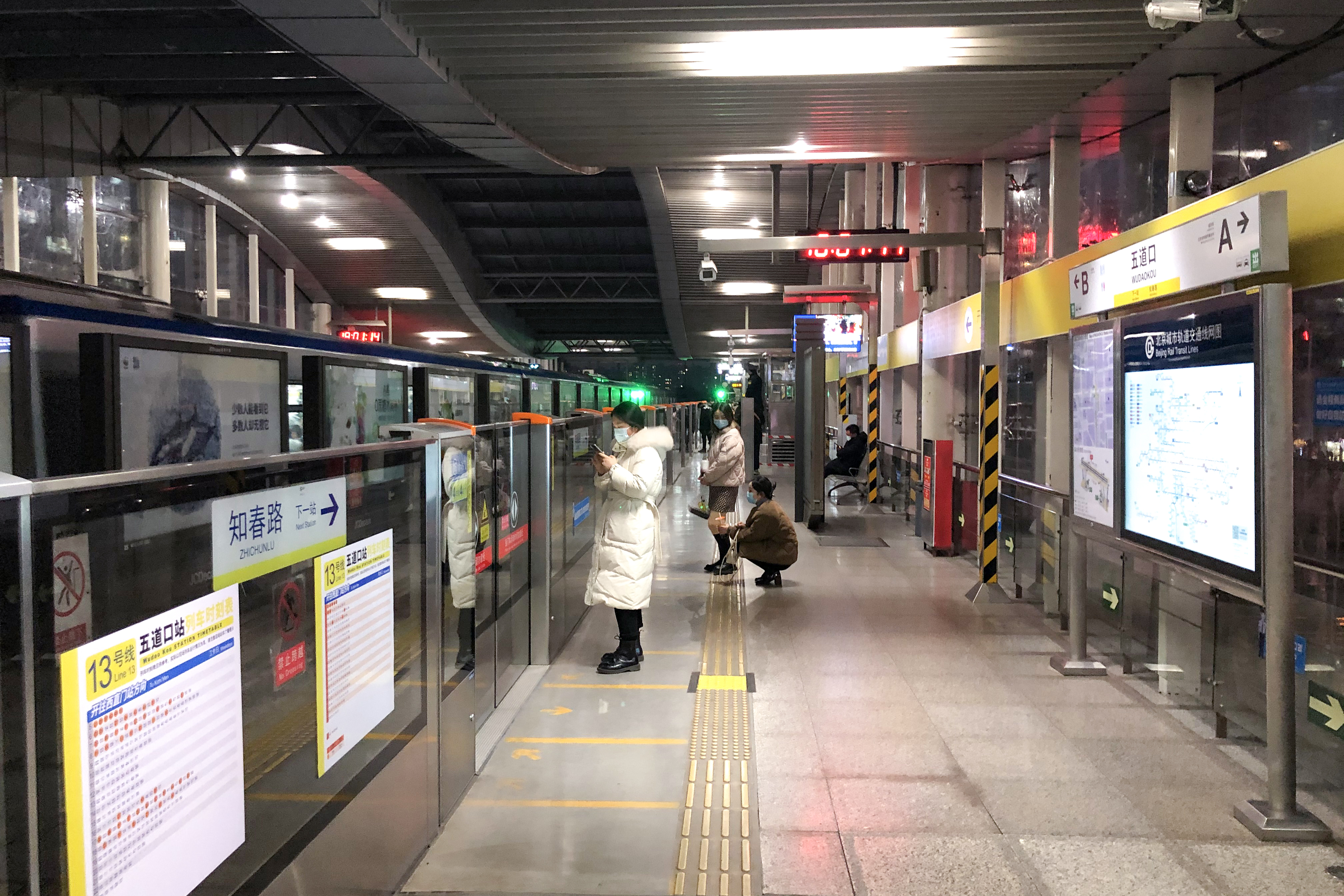
- Platform

General information
- Location: Wudaokou, Haidian District, Beijing; China
- Coordinates: 39°59′34″N 116°20′15″E
- Operator: Beijing Mass Transit Railway Operation Corporation Limited
- Line: Line 13
- Platforms: 2 (2 side platforms)
- Tracks: 2

Construction
- Structure type: Elevated
- Accessible: Yes

Other information
- Station code: 1304

History
- Opened: September 28, 2002; 23 years ago

Services
Preceding station	Beijing Subway	Following station
Zhichun Lu towards Xizhimen	Line 13	Shangdi towards Dongzhimen
Location
- Location within Beijing

Wudao Kou station (Chinese: 五道口站; pinyin: Wǔdào Kǒu zhàn) is a station on Line 13 of the Beijing Subway. As its name suggests, it is situated in the Wudaokou area of Haidian District.

== Station layout ==
The station has 2 elevated side platforms.

== Exits ==
There are 2 exits, lettered A and B, which are both accessible.
