= Zhichun Lu station =

Beijing Subway interchange station

Zhichun Lu 知春路
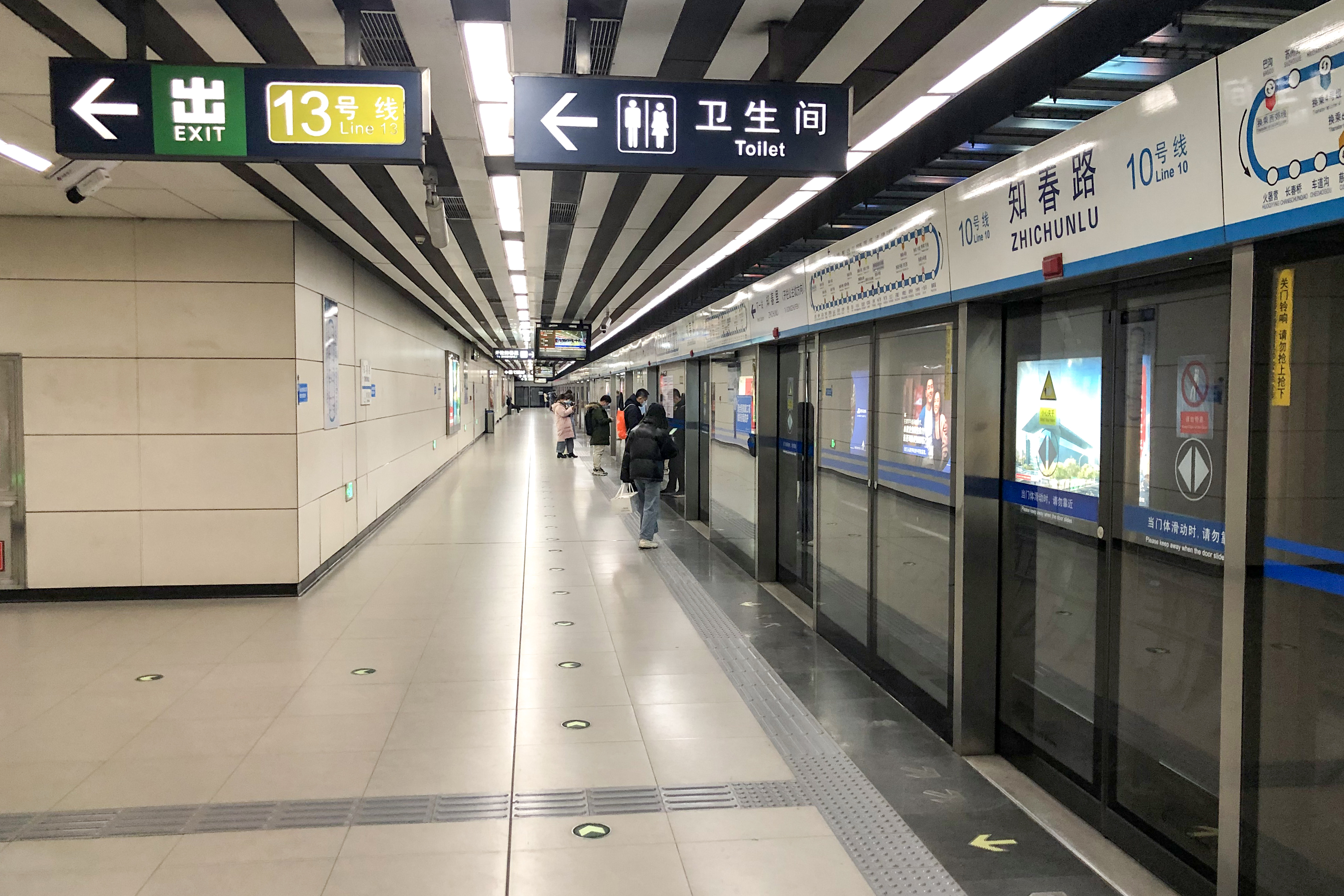
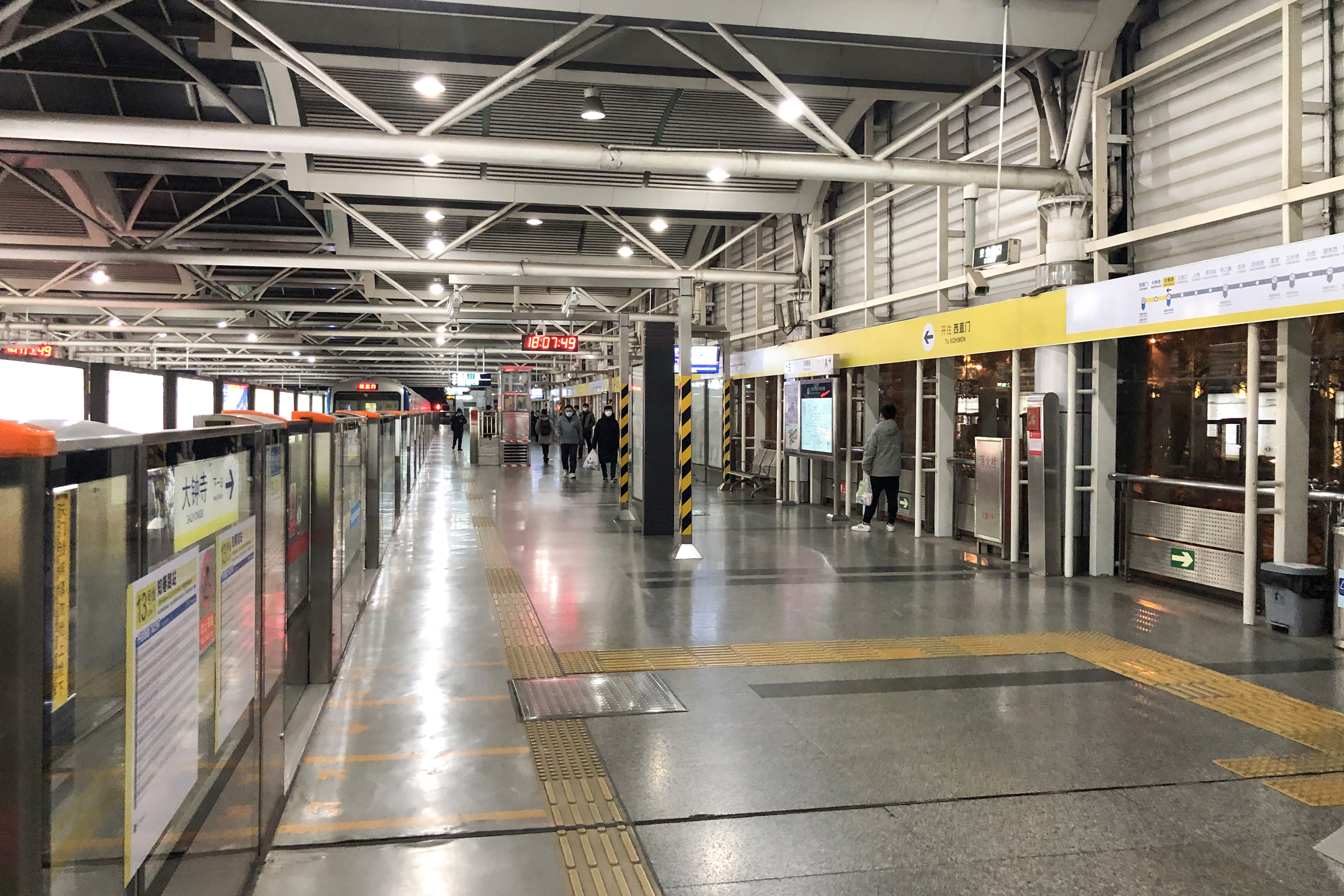
- Line 10 counter-clockwise platform Line 13 platform

General information
- Location: Zhichun Road; Haidian District, Beijing; China
- Coordinates: 39°58′35″N 116°20′24″E
- Operator: Beijing Mass Transit Railway Operation Corporation Limited
- Lines: Line 10; Line 13
- Platforms: 4 (1 split island platform and 2 side platforms)
- Tracks: 4

Construction
- Structure type: Underground (Line 10); At-grade (Line 13)
- Accessible: Yes

Other information
- Station code: 1303 (Line 13)

History
- Opened: July 19, 2008; 18 years ago (Line 10); September 28, 2002; 23 years ago (Line 13)

Services
Preceding station	Beijing Subway	Following station
Zhichun Li outer loop / anticlockwise	Line 10	Xitucheng inner loop / clockwise
Dazhong Si towards Xizhimen	Line 13	Wudao Kou towards Dongzhimen
Location
- Location within Beijing

Zhichun Lu Station (Chinese: 知春路站; pinyin: Zhīchūnlù Zhàn) is an interchange station between Line 10 and Line 13 of the Beijing Subway.

== Station layout ==
The line 10 station has an underground split island platform. The line 13 station has two at-grade side platforms.

== Exits ==
There are five exits, lettered A, B, F, G1, and G2. Exits A, B, G1, and G2 are accessible.

== Gallery ==
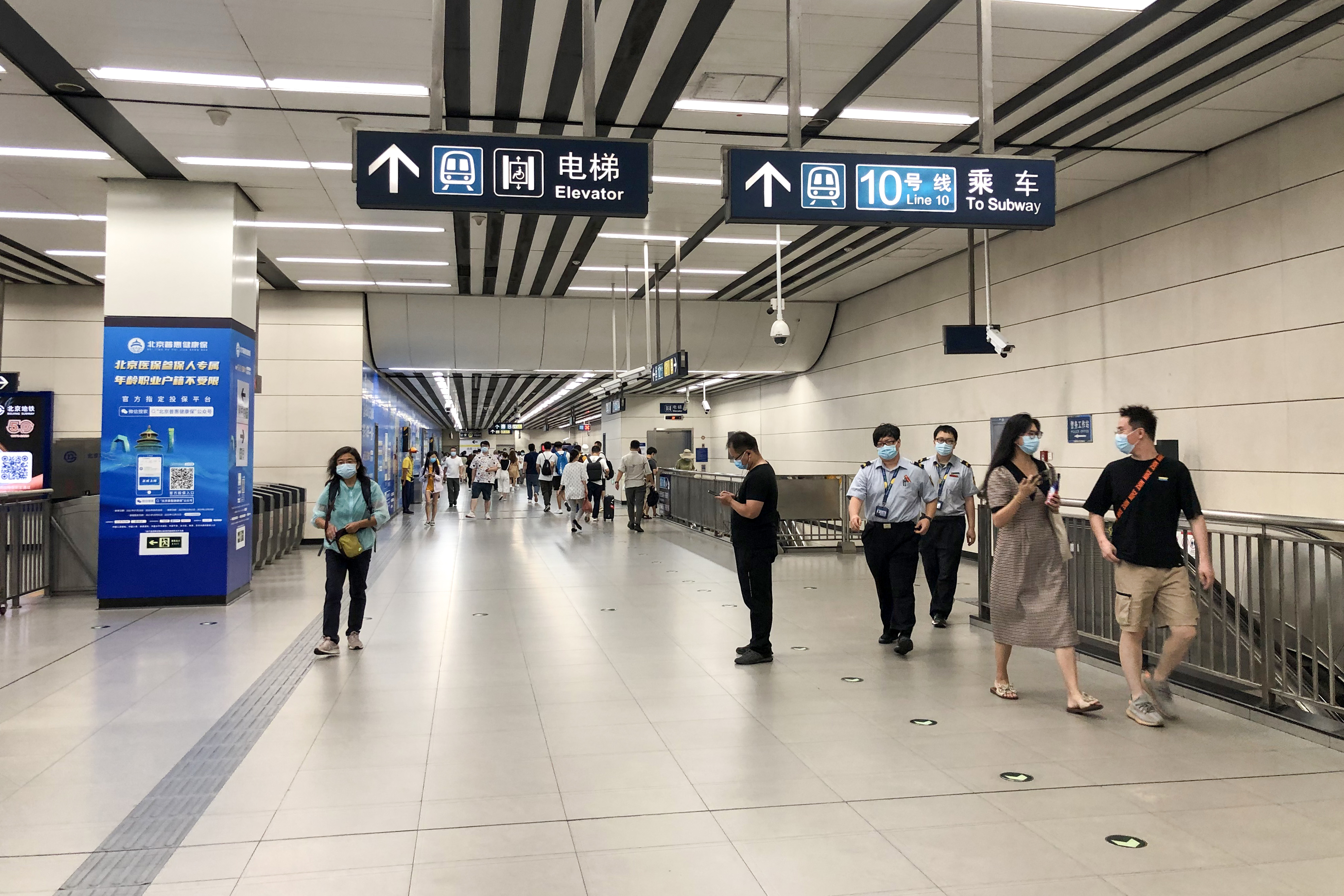
Line 10 concourse

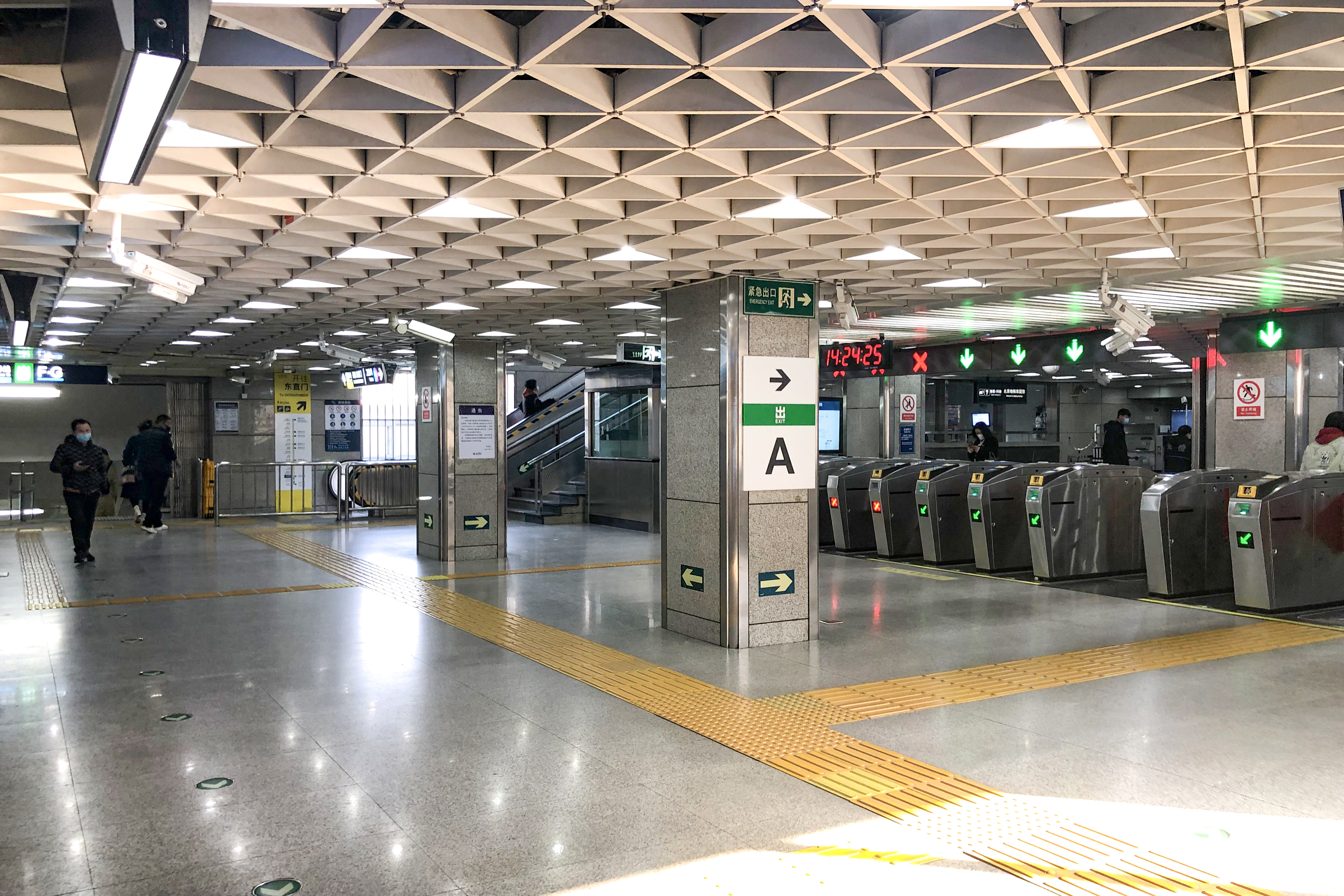
Line 13 north concourse

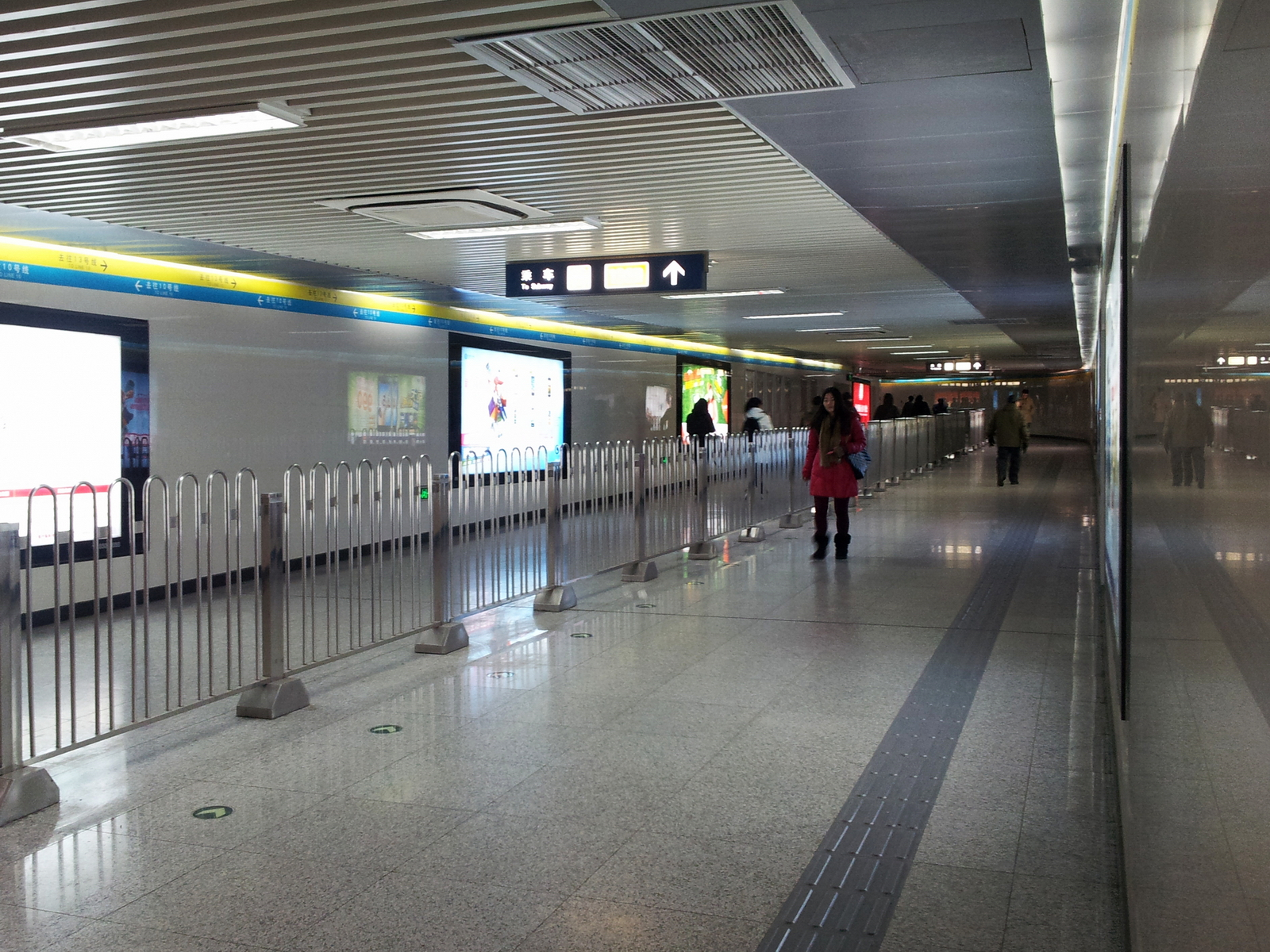
Interchange corridor
