= Shangdi station =

Beijing Subway station

Coordinates: 40°01′59″N 116°19′13″E

Shangdi 上地
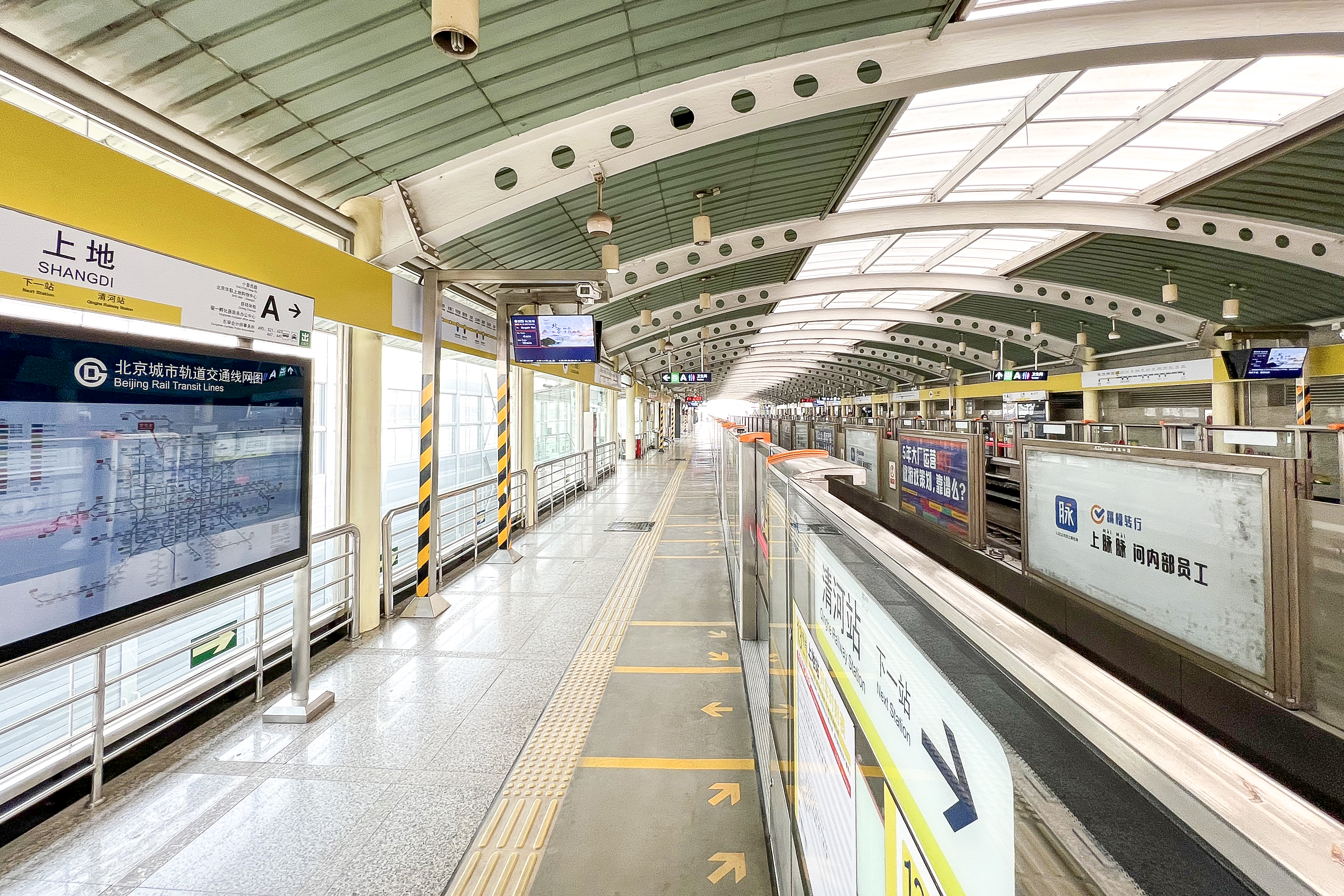
- Platform

General information
- Location: Shangdi East No. 2 Road (上地东二路); Haidian District, Beijing; China
- Operator: Beijing Mass Transit Railway Operation Corporation Limited
- Line: Line 13
- Platforms: 2 (2 side platforms)
- Tracks: 2

Construction
- Structure type: At-grade
- Accessible: Yes

Other information
- Station code: 1305

History
- Opened: September 28, 2002

Services
Preceding station	Beijing Subway	Following station
Wudaokou towards Xizhimen	Line 13	Qinghe railway station towards Dongzhimen
Location
- Location within Beijing

Shangdi station (Chinese: 上地站; pinyin: Shàngdì zhàn) is a station on Line 13 of the Beijing Subway.

== Station layout ==
The station has 2 at-grade side platforms.

== Exits ==
There is 1 exit, lettered A, which is accessible.
