= Guangxi Men station =

Beijing Subway Line 12 and Line 13 station

Guangxi Men 光熙门
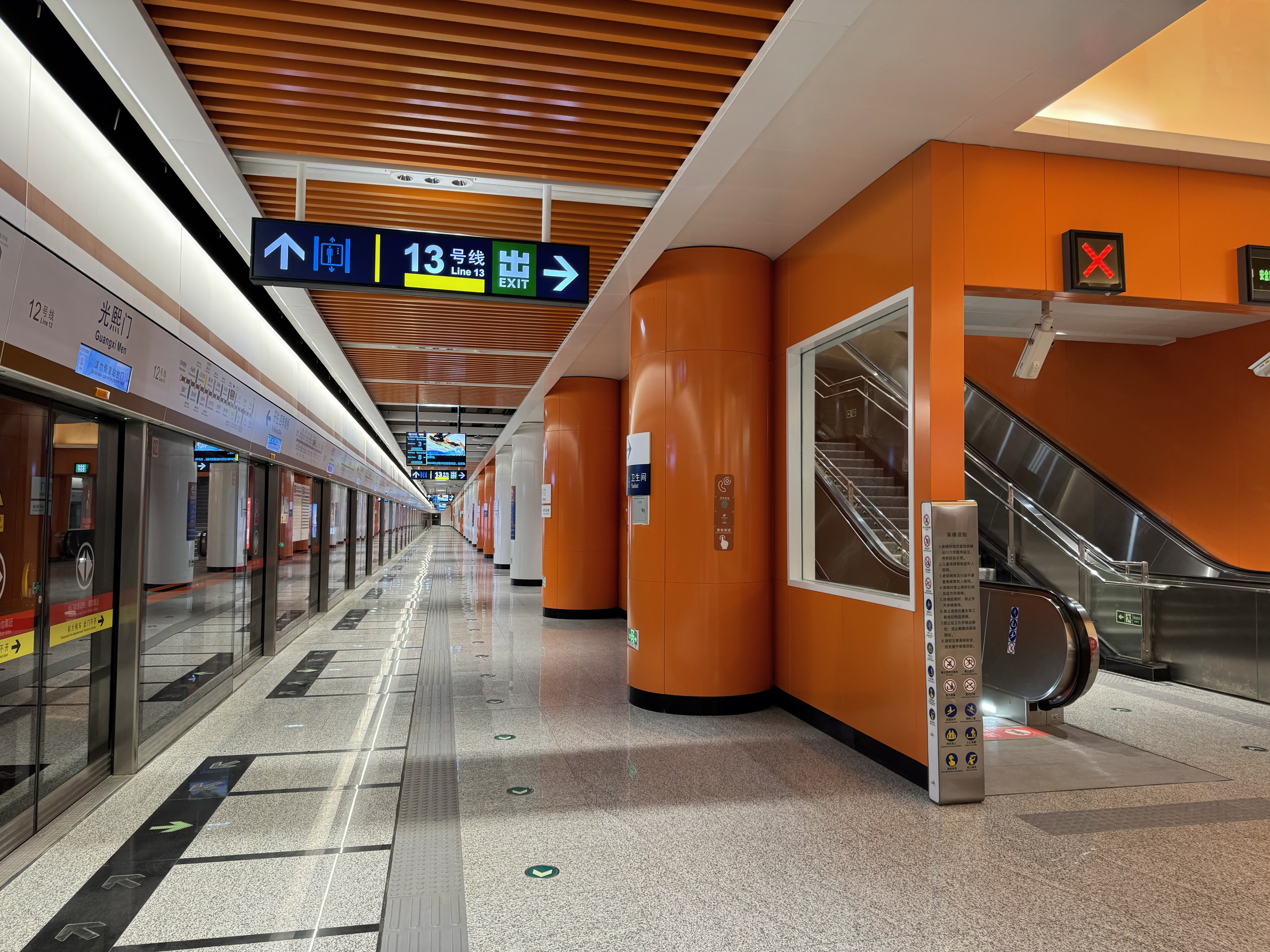
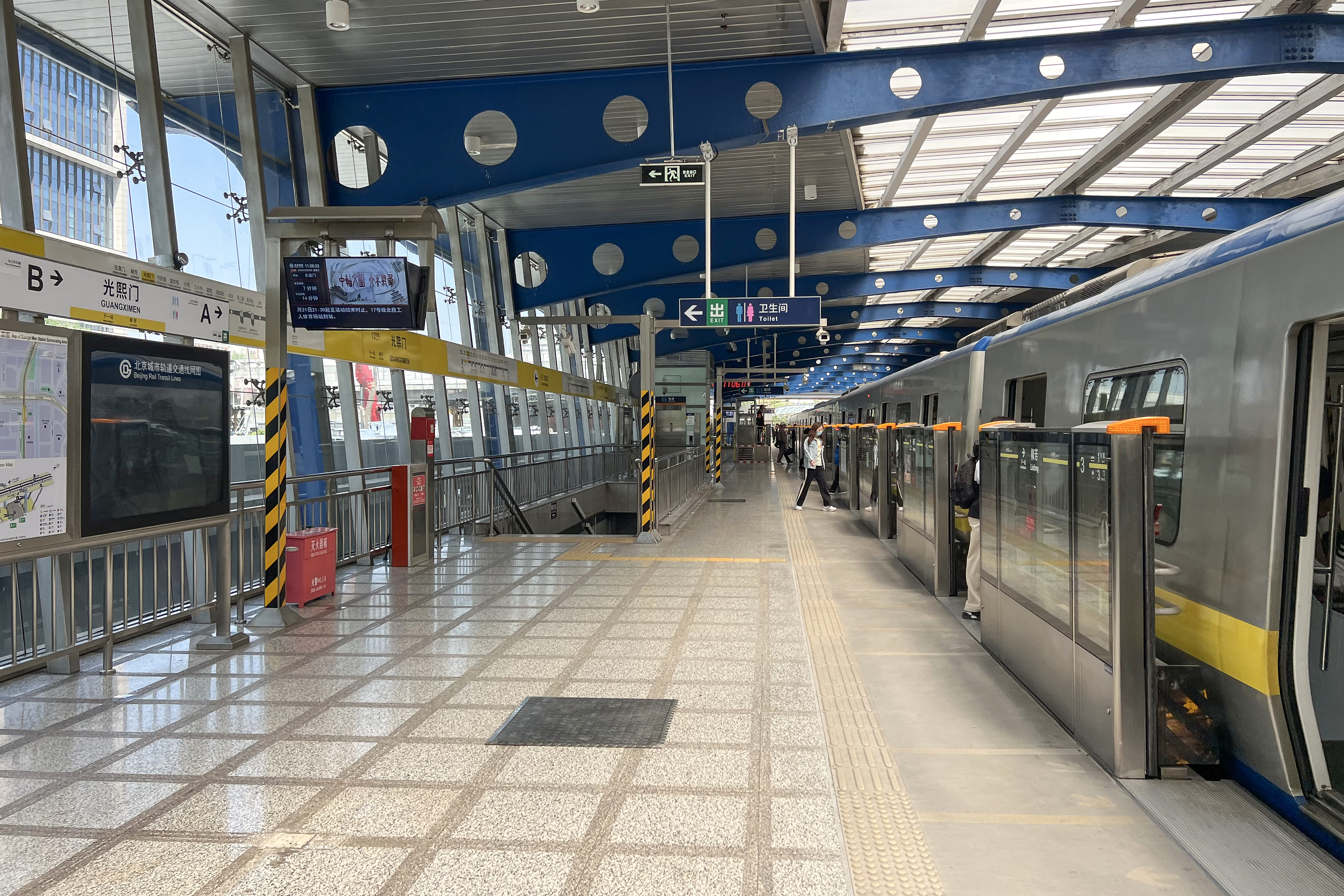
- Line 12 platform Line 13 southbound platform

General information
- Location: Taiyanggong Bridge (太阳宫桥); Chaoyang District, Beijing; China
- Coordinates: 39°58′06″N 116°25′54″E
- Operator: Beijing Mass Transit Railway Operation Corporation Limited
- Lines: Line 12; Line 13
- Platforms: 4 (1 island platform and 2 side platforms)
- Tracks: 4

Construction
- Structure type: At-grade (Line 13); Underground (Line 12)
- Accessible: Yes

Other information
- Station code: 1314 (Line 13)

History
- Opened: Line 13: January 28, 2003; 23 years ago; Line 12: December 15, 2024; 20 months ago

Services
| Preceding station | Beijing Subway | Following station |
|---|---|---|
| Heping Xiqiao towards Sijiqing Qiao | Line 12 | Xibahe towards Dongbabei |
| Shaoyaoju towards Xizhimen | Line 13 | Liufang towards Dongzhimen |
Location
- Location within Beijing

Guangxi Men station (simplified Chinese: 光熙门站; traditional Chinese: 光熙門站; pinyin: Guāngxī Mén zhàn) is an interchange station between Line 12 and Line 13 of the Beijing Subway. The Line 13 station opened on January 28, 2003, whilst the Line 12 station opened on December 15, 2024.

== Name and location ==
It is located south of the interchange of North 3rd Ring Road East and the southern terminus of the Jingcheng Expressway, known as Taiyanggong Bridge (太阳宫桥). It is named after the Guangxi Gate (simplified Chinese: 光熙门; traditional Chinese: 光熙門; pinyin: Guāngxī Mén).

== Station layout ==
Line 13 station has 2 at-grade side platforms.

Line 12 station has an underground island platform.

== Exits ==
There are 5 exits, lettered A, B, D1, D2 and E. Exit A is accessible. Exit C (Northwest exit of Line 12) is under planning.

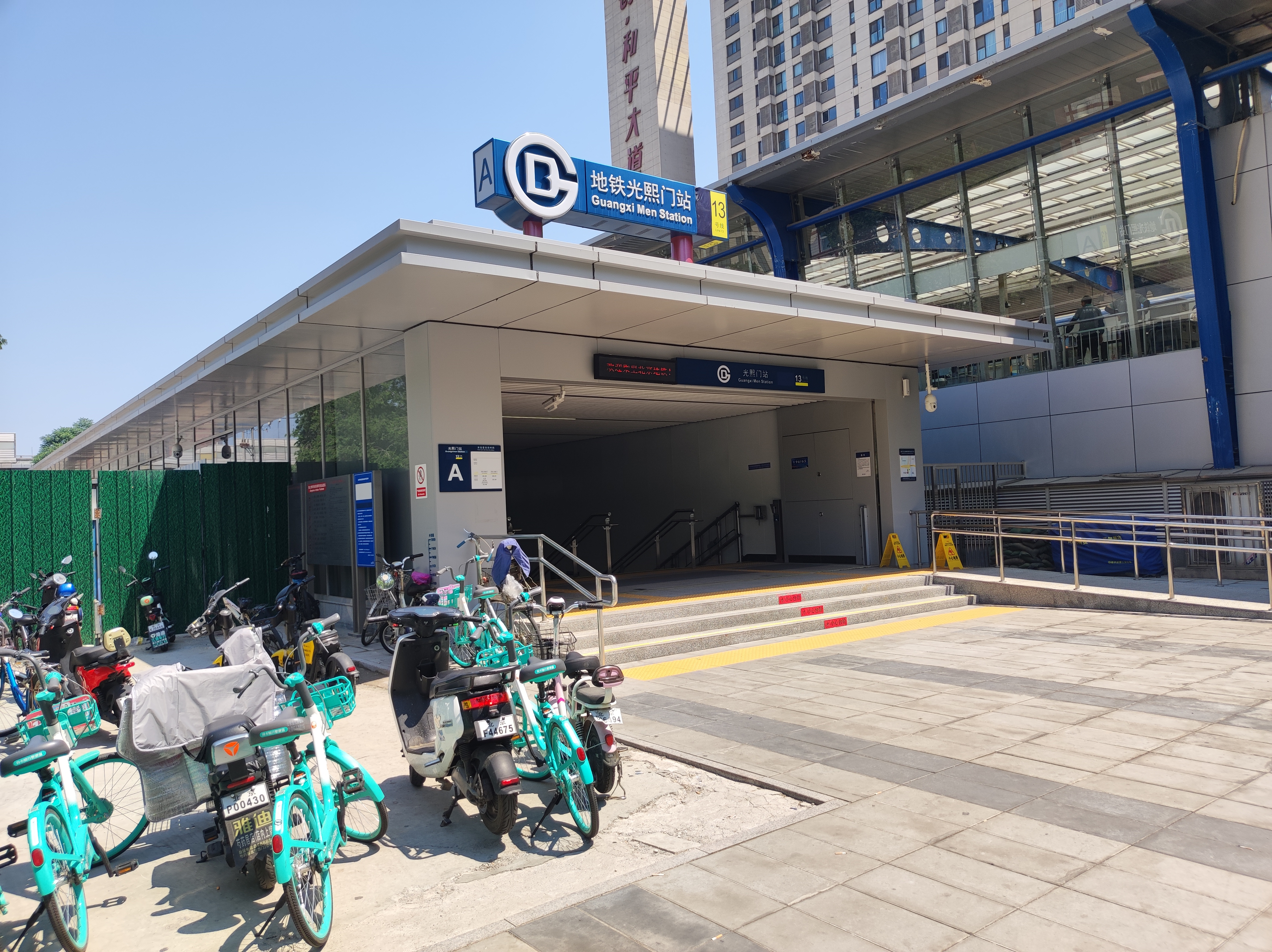
Exit A (Line 13, May 2024)

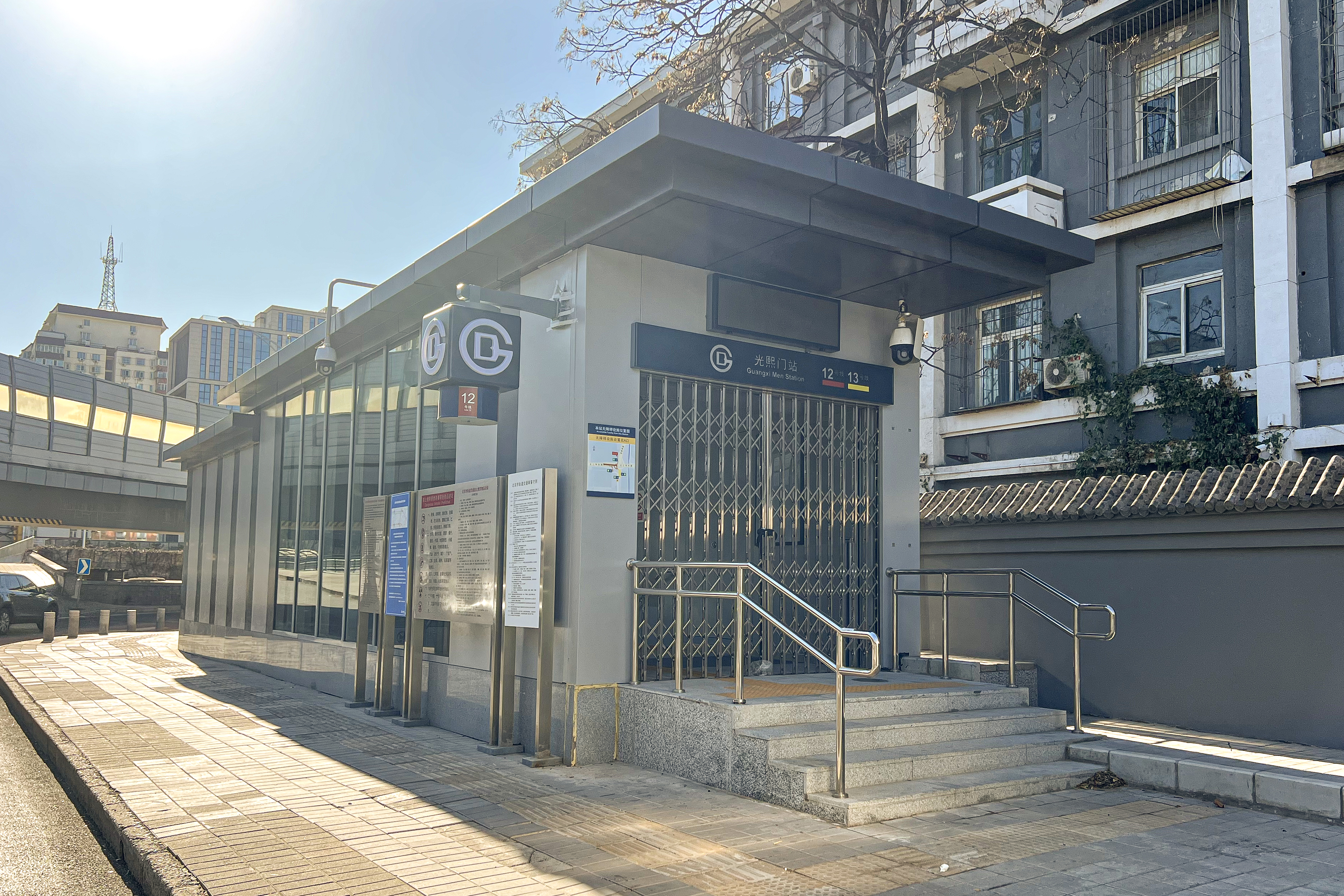
Exit D2, Line 12

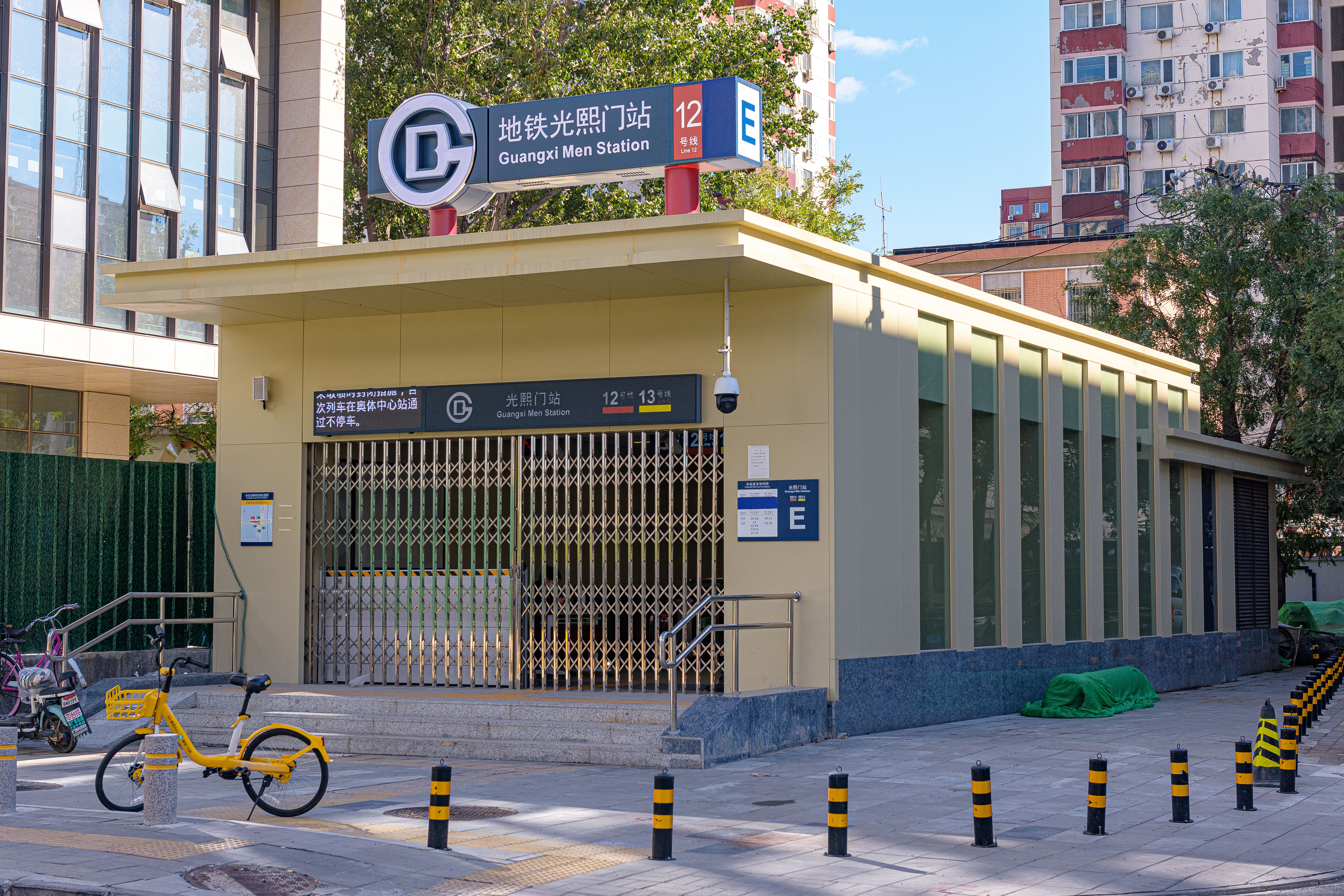
Exit E, Line 12

== Gallery ==
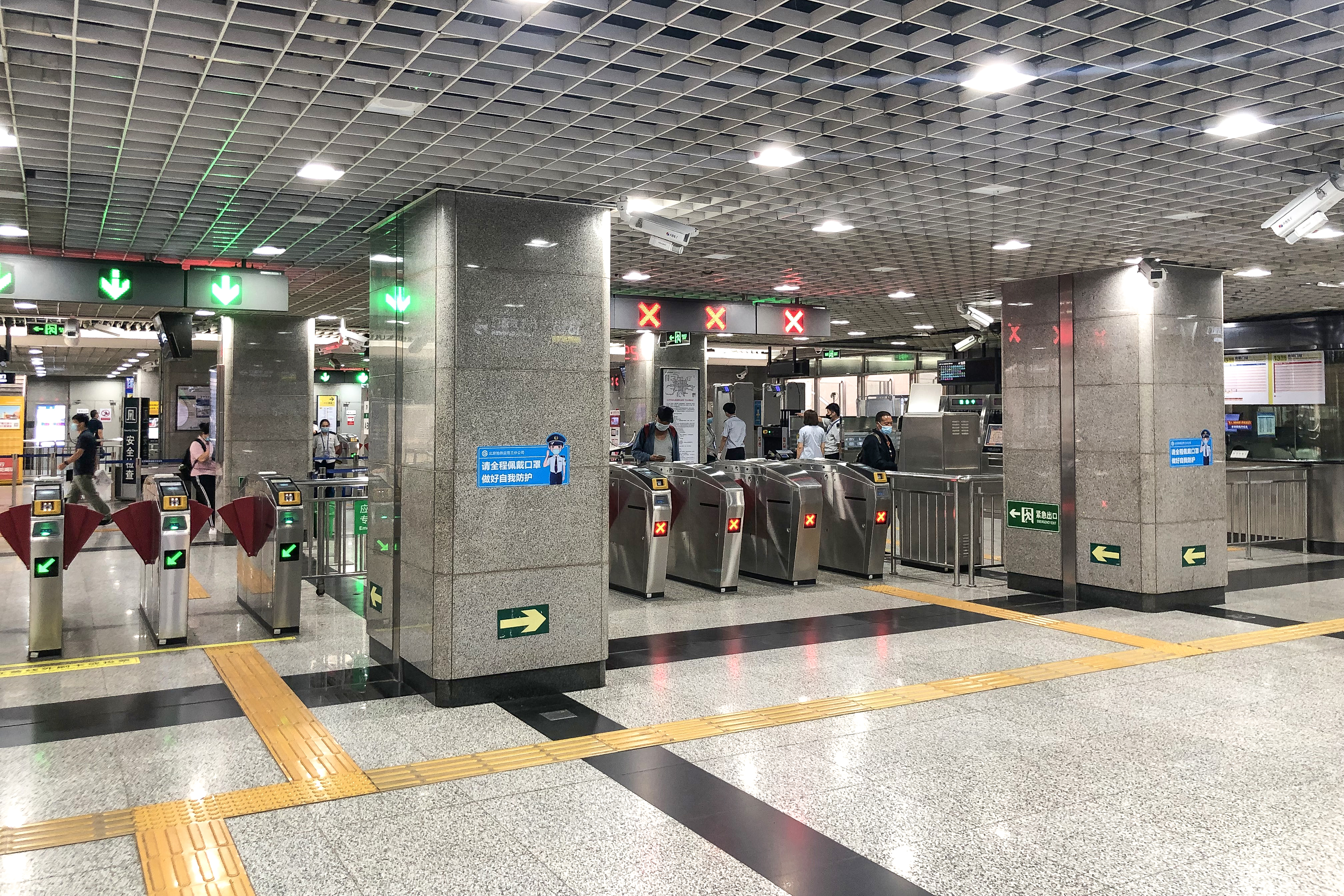
Line 13 concourse

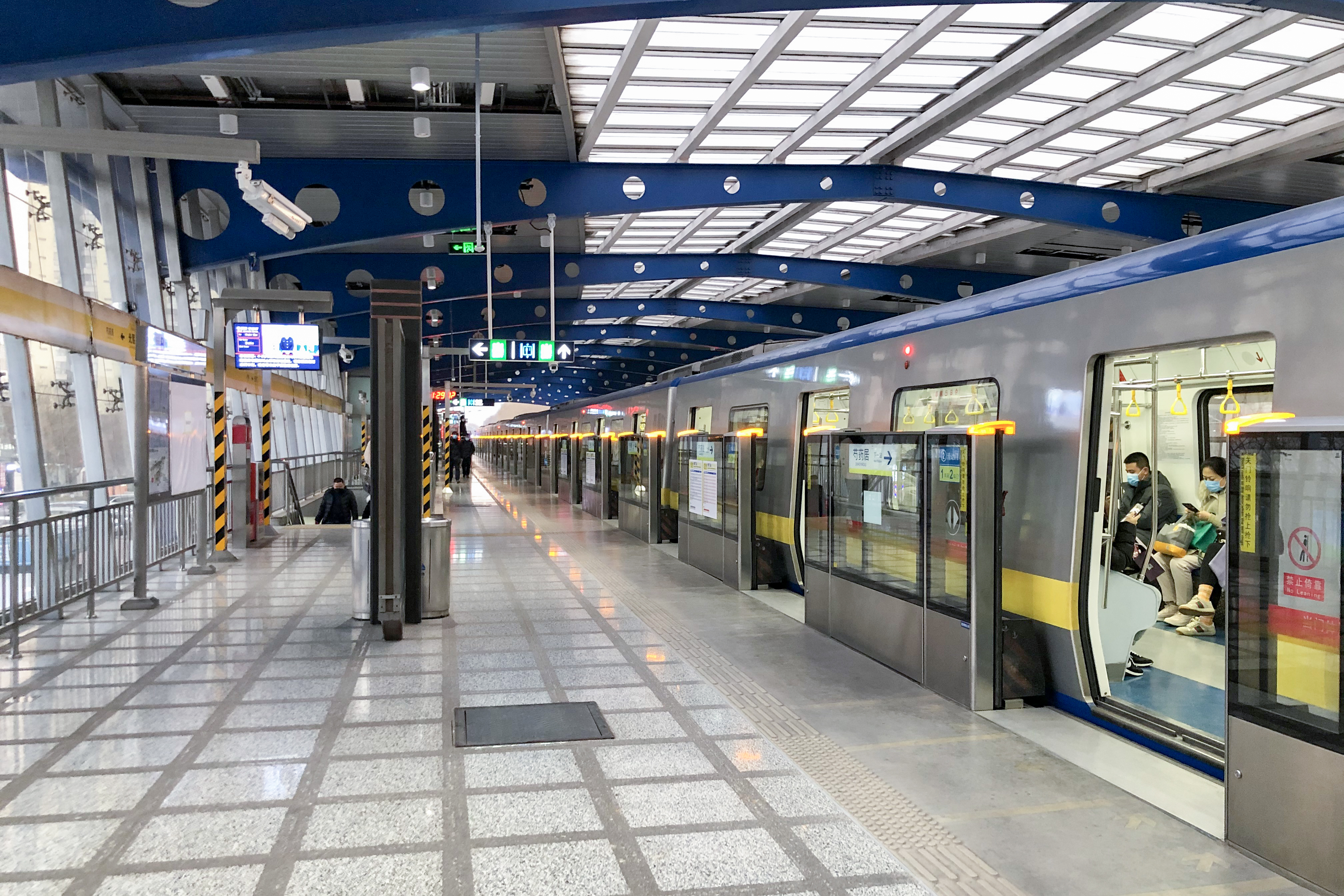
Line 13 northbound platform

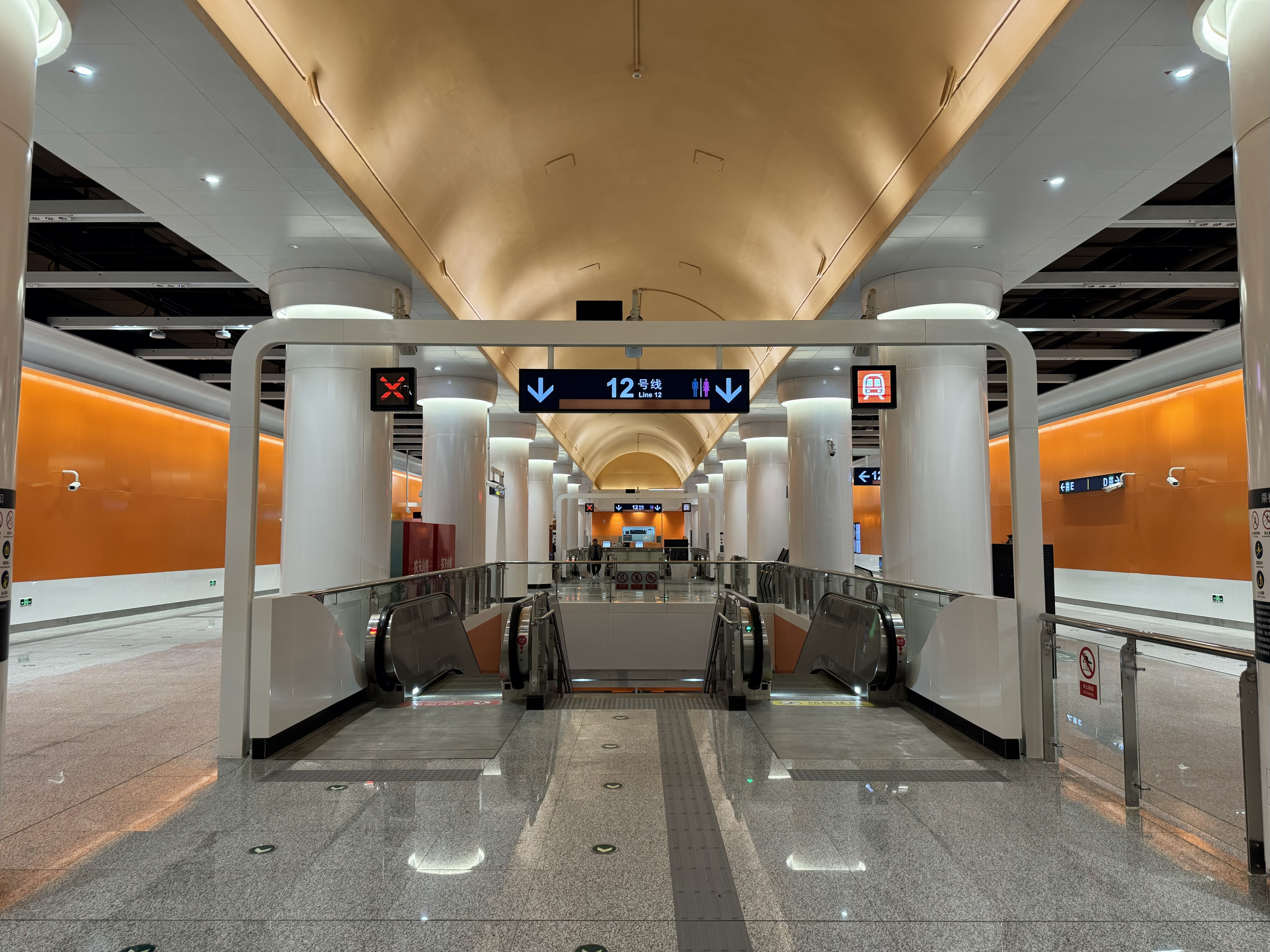
Line 12 concourse

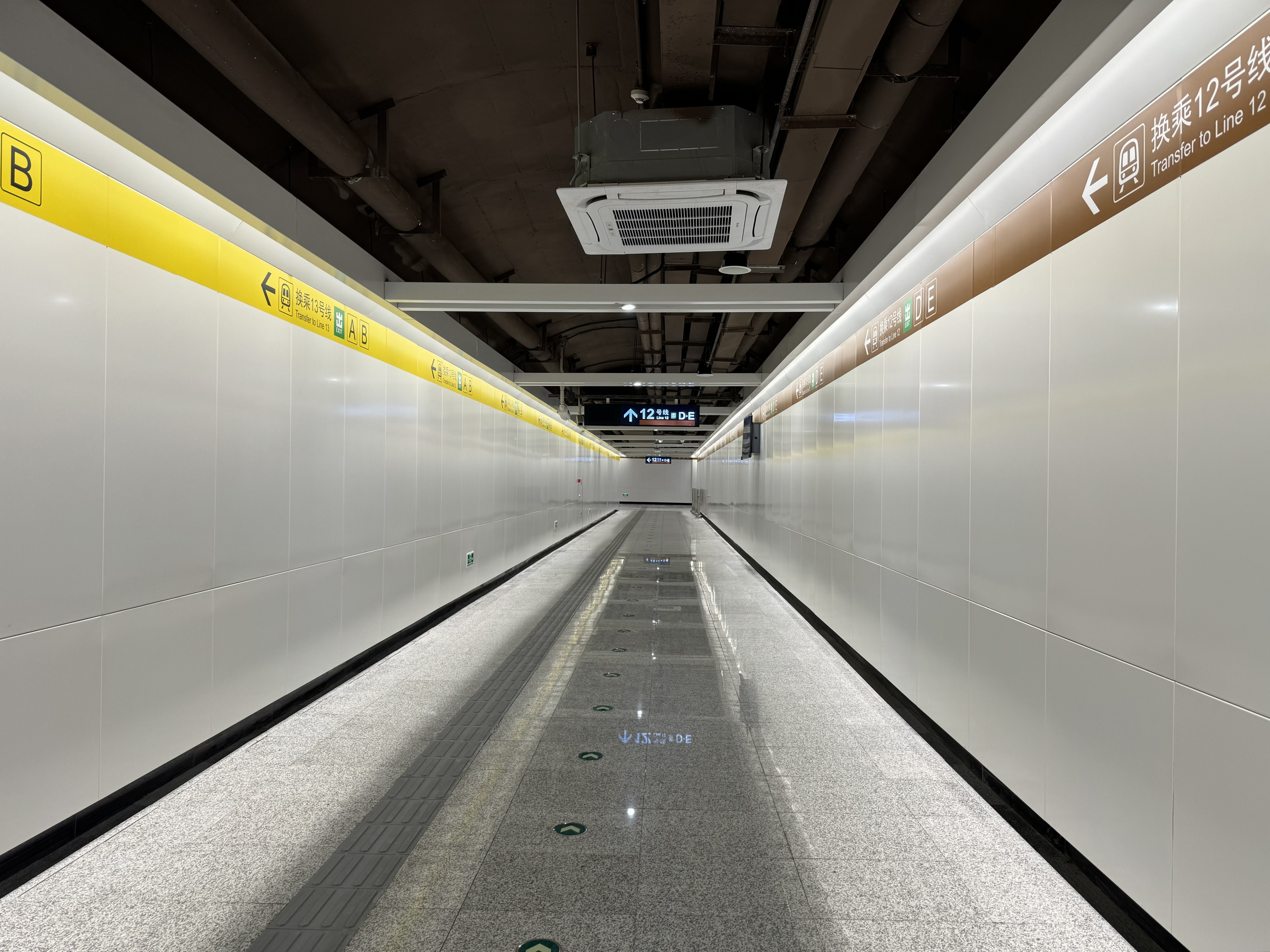
Interchange passage
