= Longze station =

Beijing Subway station

Longze 龙泽
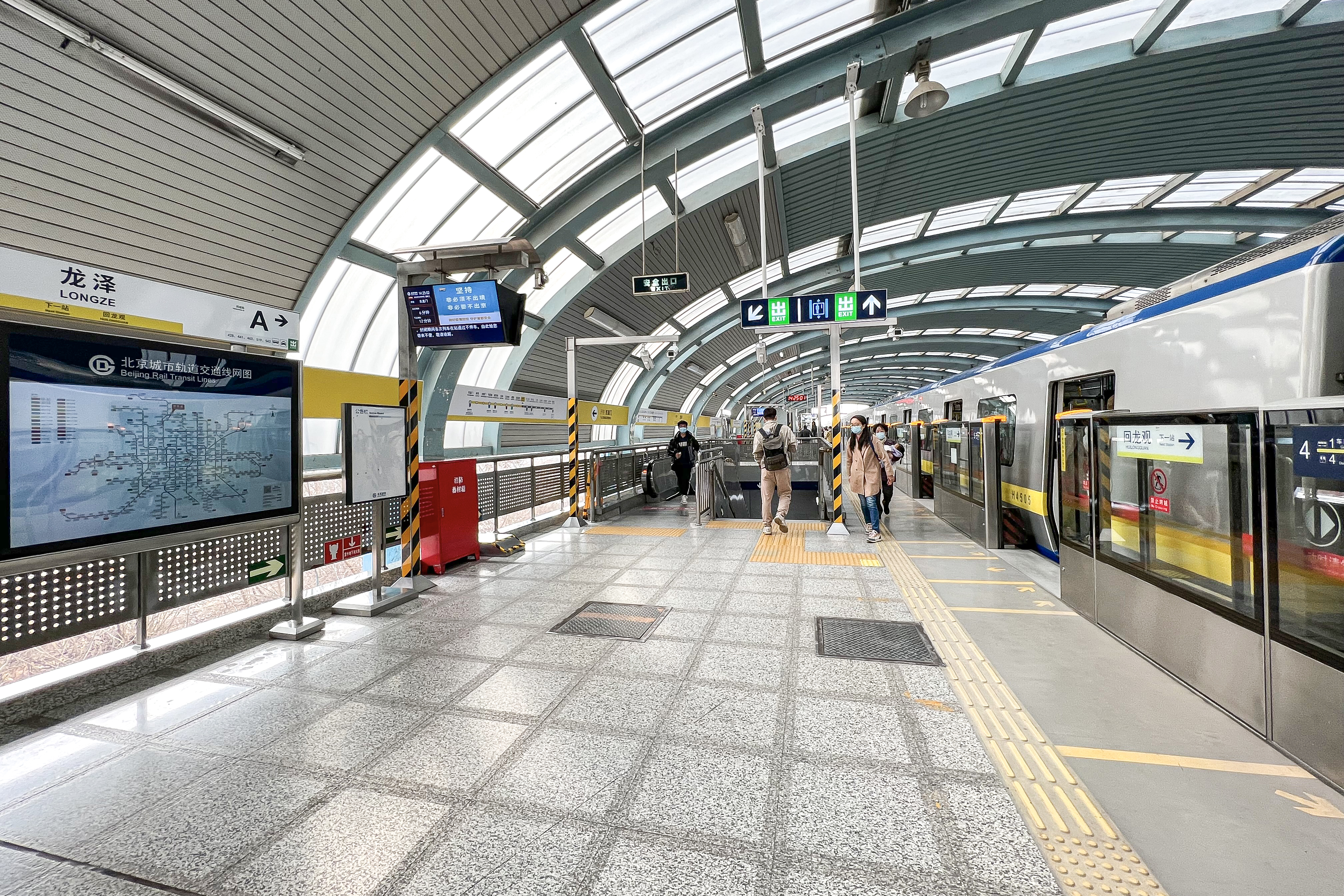
- Platform

General information
- Location: Tongcheng Street, Longzeyuan Subdistrict, Changping District, Beijing; China
- Coordinates: 40°04′15″N 116°19′09″E
- Operator: Beijing Mass Transit Railway Operation Corporation Limited
- Line: Line 13
- Platforms: 2 (2 side platforms)
- Tracks: 2

Construction
- Structure type: Elevated
- Accessible: Yes

Other information
- Station code: 1307

History
- Opened: September 28, 2002; 23 years ago

Services
Preceding station	Beijing Subway	Following station
Xi'erqi towards Xizhimen	Line 13	Huilong Guan towards Dongzhimen
Location
- Location within Beijing

Longze station (simplified Chinese: 龙泽站; traditional Chinese: 龍澤站; pinyin: Lóngzé zhàn) is a station on Line 13 of the Beijing Subway.

== Station layout ==
The station has 2 elevated side platforms.

== Exits ==
There is one exit, lettered A, which is accessible.
