= Huilong Guan station =

Beijing Subway station

Huilong Guan 回龙观
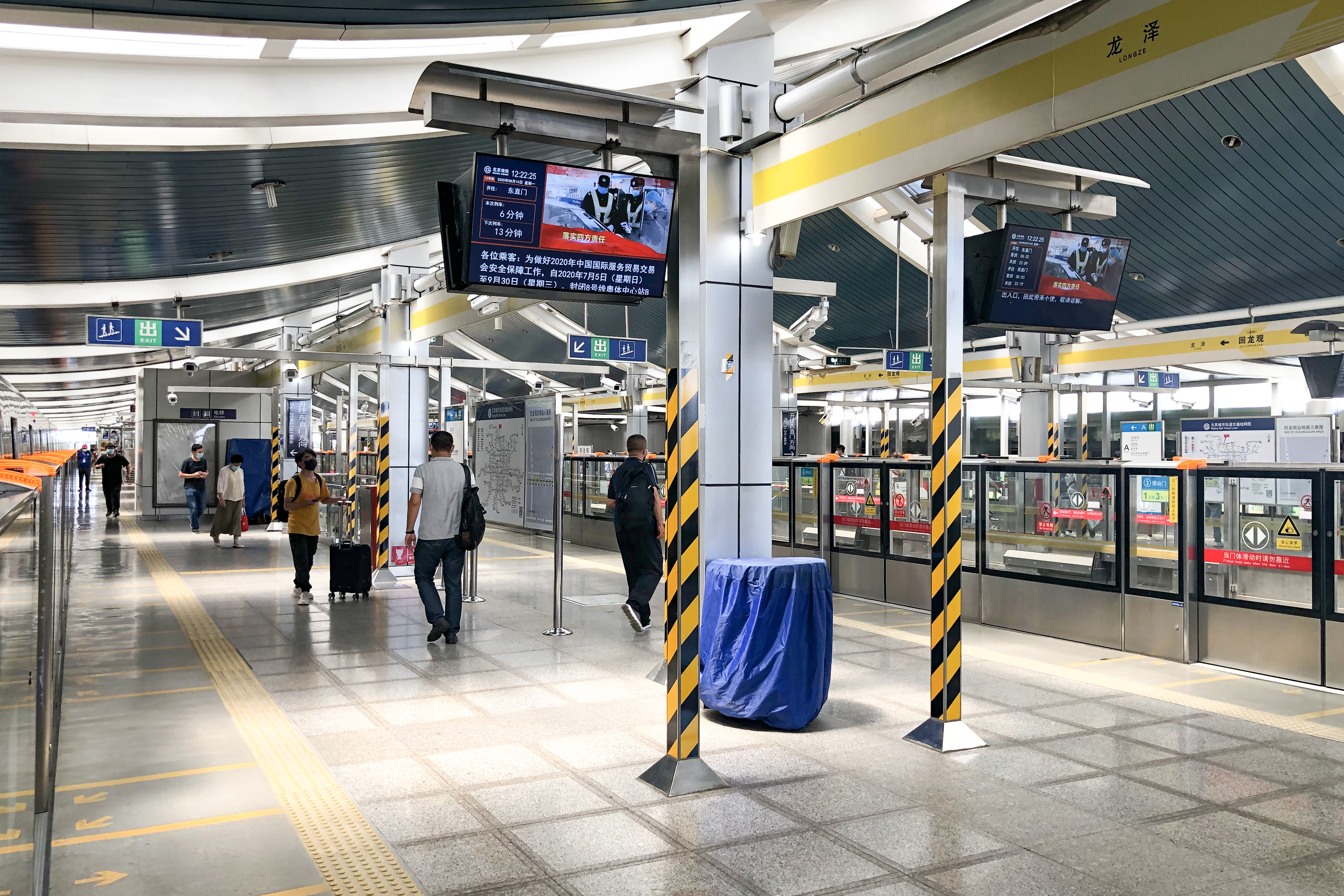
- Eastbound platform

General information
- Location: Tongcheng Street (同成街) and East Yuzhi Road (育知东路); Huilongguan, Changping District, Beijing; China
- Coordinates: 40°04′15″N 116°20′10″E
- Operator: Beijing Mass Transit Railway Operation Corporation Limited
- Line: Line 13
- Platforms: 4 (2 island platforms)
- Tracks: 3

Construction
- Structure type: At-grade
- Accessible: Yes

Other information
- Station code: 1308

History
- Opened: September 28, 2002; 23 years ago

Services
Preceding station	Beijing Subway	Following station
Longze towards Xizhimen	Line 13	Huoying towards Dongzhimen
Location
- Location within Beijing

Huilong Guan Station (simplified Chinese: 回龙观站; traditional Chinese: 回龍觀站; pinyin: Huílóng Guàn Zhàn) is a station on Line 13 of the Beijing Subway, located in the Huilongguan residential area of Changping District.

== Station layout ==
The station has at-grade dual-island platforms with a track at the middle. Some eastbound trains terminate at the centre track, whilst regular trains operate on the 2 outer tracks.

== Exits ==
There are 2 exits, lettered A1 and A2. Both are accessible.
