= Liufang station =

Beijing Subway station

Coordinates: 39°57′30″N 116°25′58″E

Liufang 柳芳
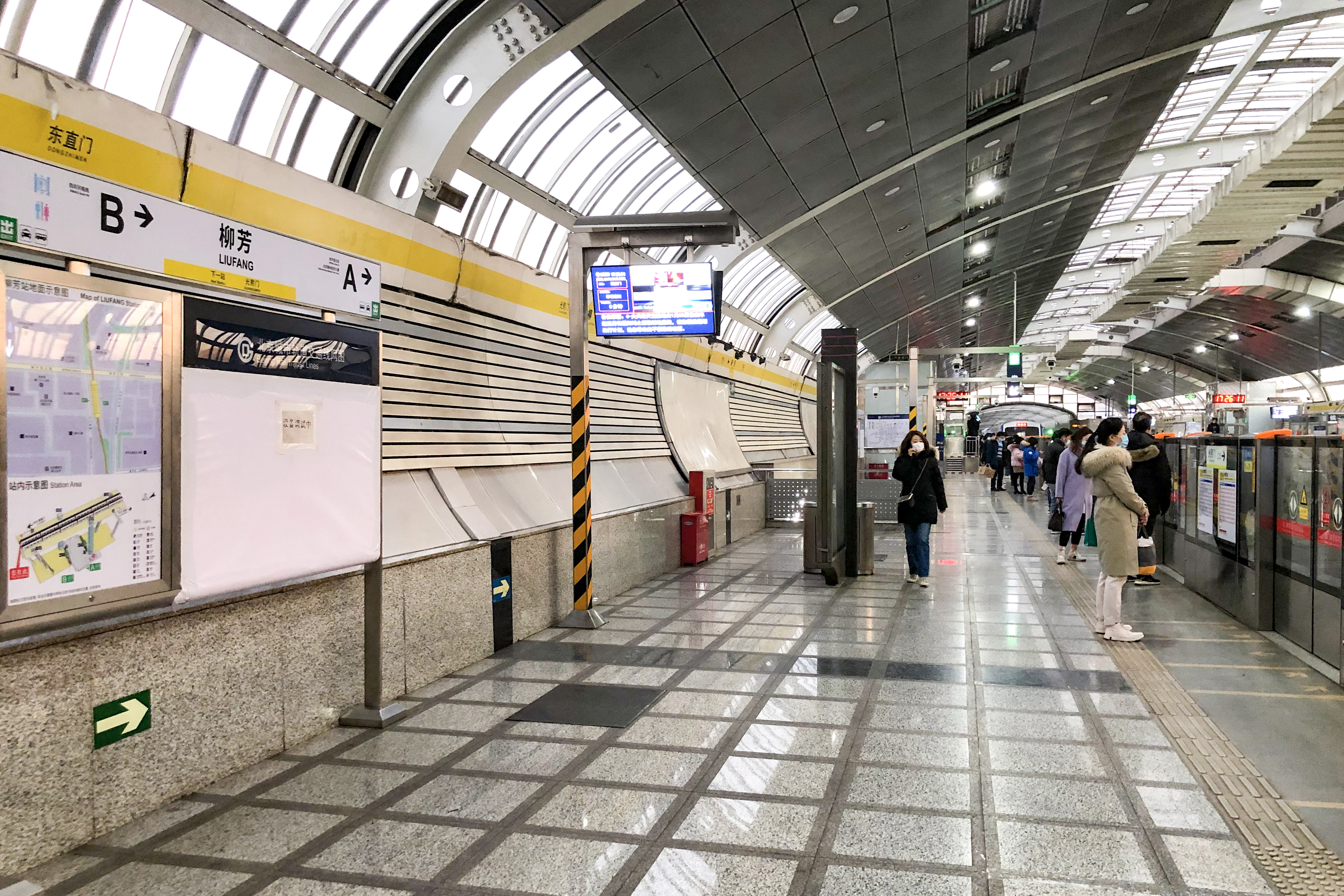
- Platform

General information
- Location: Dongtucheng Road (东土城路) and Liufang North Street (柳芳北街); Chaoyang District, Beijing; China
- Operator: Beijing Mass Transit Railway Operation Corporation Limited
- Line: Line 13
- Platforms: 2 (2 side platforms)
- Tracks: 2

Construction
- Structure type: Elevated
- Accessible: Yes

Other information
- Station code: 1315

History
- Opened: January 28, 2003; 23 years ago

Services
Preceding station	Beijing Subway	Following station
Guangximen towards Xizhimen	Line 13	Dongzhimen Terminus
Location
- Location within Beijing

Liufang Station (Chinese: 柳芳站; pinyin: Liǔfāng Zhàn) is a station on Line 13 of the Beijing Subway in China.

== Station layout ==
The station has 2 at-grade side platforms.

== Exits ==
There are 2 exits, lettered A and B. Exit A is accessible.
