= Line 13 (Beijing Subway) =

Metro line serving the northern suburbs of Beijing

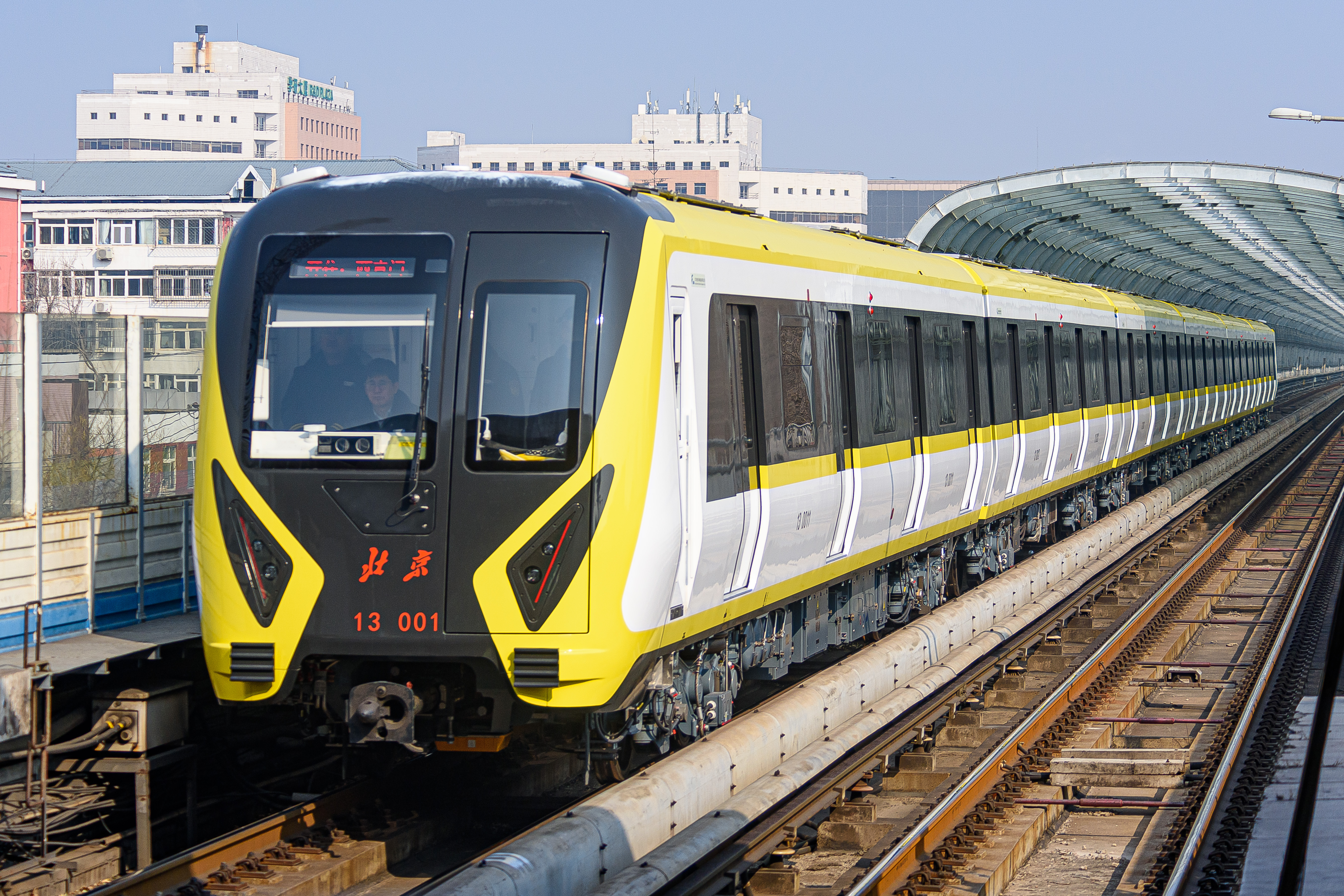
- Line 13 train entering Wudao Kou station

Overview
- Other name(s): M13 (planned name); City Railway (Chinese: 城市铁路 / 城铁)
- Status: Operational
- Locale: Dongcheng, Chaoyang, Changping, Haidian, and Xicheng districts Beijing
- Termini: Xizhimen; Dongzhimen
- Stations: 17

Service
- Type: Rapid transit
- System: Beijing Subway
- Operator: Beijing Mass Transit Railway Operation Corp., Ltd
- Depot: Huilongguan Depot
- Rolling stock: 6-car Quasi-Type B (DKZ5, DKZ6)
- Daily ridership: 433,500 (2024 Avg.)

History
- Opened: September 28, 2002; 24 years ago

Technical
- Line length: 40.85 km (25.38 mi)
- Character: Elevated, at-grade, underground (Note: Dongzhimen station is underground. There is also a tunnel between Xi'erqi and Longze.)
- Track gauge: 1,435 mm (4 ft 8 1/2 in)
- Electrification: 750 V DC Third rail
- Operating speed: 80 km/h (50 mph)

Line 13 of the Beijing Subway (Chinese: 北京地铁13号线; pinyin: běijīng dìtiě shísānhào xiàn) is a metro line that serves the northern suburbs of Beijing. On a map, Line 13's route is shaped like an inverted U that arcs north of the city and connects residential suburbs in Haidian, Changping, and Chaoyang Districts with the 2nd Ring Road and Line 2 at Xizhimen and Dongzhimen. With the exception of Dongzhimen and a tunnel between Xi'erqi and Longze, all of Line 13's tracks and stations are located on the surface or elevated above ground. The line is 40.85 km (25.38 mi) in length and 16 of its 17 stations are on the surface. Line 13's color is yellow on official maps, signage, and station branding. During rush hour, the section between Xizhimen and Wudaokou stations was reported in 2013 to be the second most congested section in the Beijing subway network, operating at 130% capacity.

== Fare ==
The Bejing subway fares range from CNY 3-10 for all lines, with digital banking systems being a prominent payment type as opposed to traditional ticketing.

Regular subway users can use a Yikatong card, which offers cheaper journeys, as well as mobile phone apps, which deploy payments via a QR code.

== Hours of operation ==
The first trains depart from Xizhimen and Dongzhimen at 5:34 am. The last trains to go the full-distance and reach the other terminus depart from Xizhimen and Dongzhimen at 10:49 pm and 10:41pm respectively. In addition, Line 13 offers later night trains from either terminus that travel half of the route's length. The last train to leave Xizhimen, departs at 11:45 pm and ends its journey at Huilongguan at 12:09 am. The last train to leave Dongzhimen, departs at 11:45 pm and ends its journey at Huoying at 12:09 am. The official timetable of the first and last trains of Line 13 can be seen online. The frequency of trains on Line 13 varies from 3.5 minutes per train during the morning rush hour (6:20 am – 9:40 am) to 5 minutes per train during the evening rush hour (4:40 pm – 8:40 pm) to 10-11.5 minutes per train after 10:50 pm. For a full listing of train frequency, see.

== Route ==
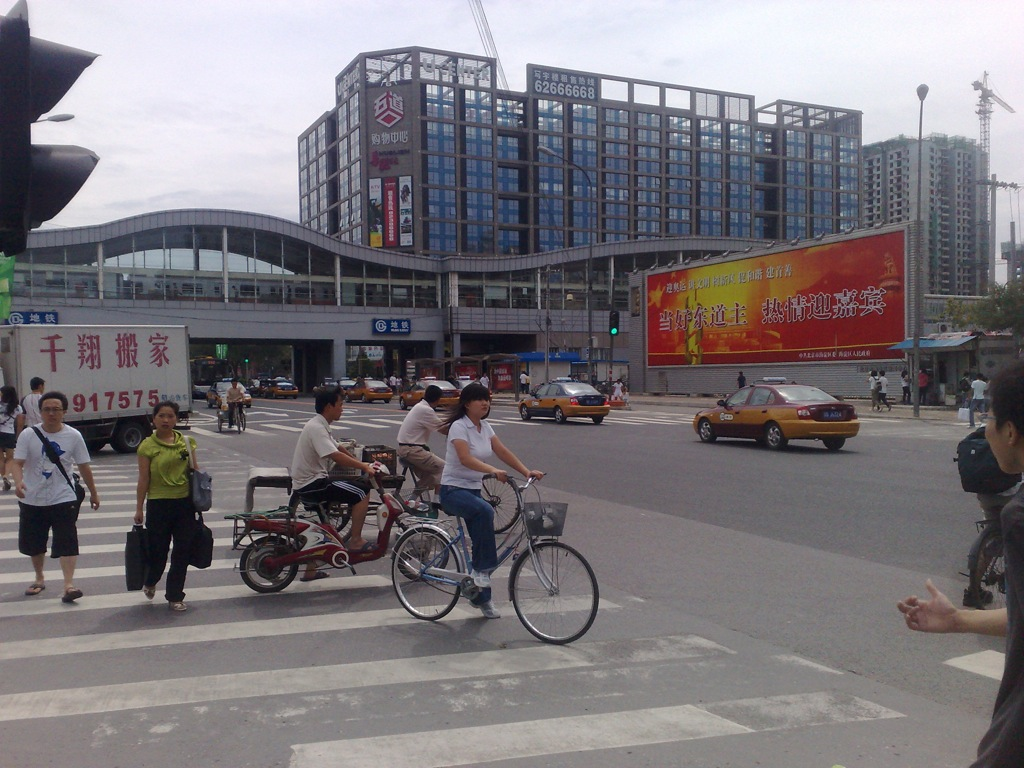
Wudaokou Station in 2008

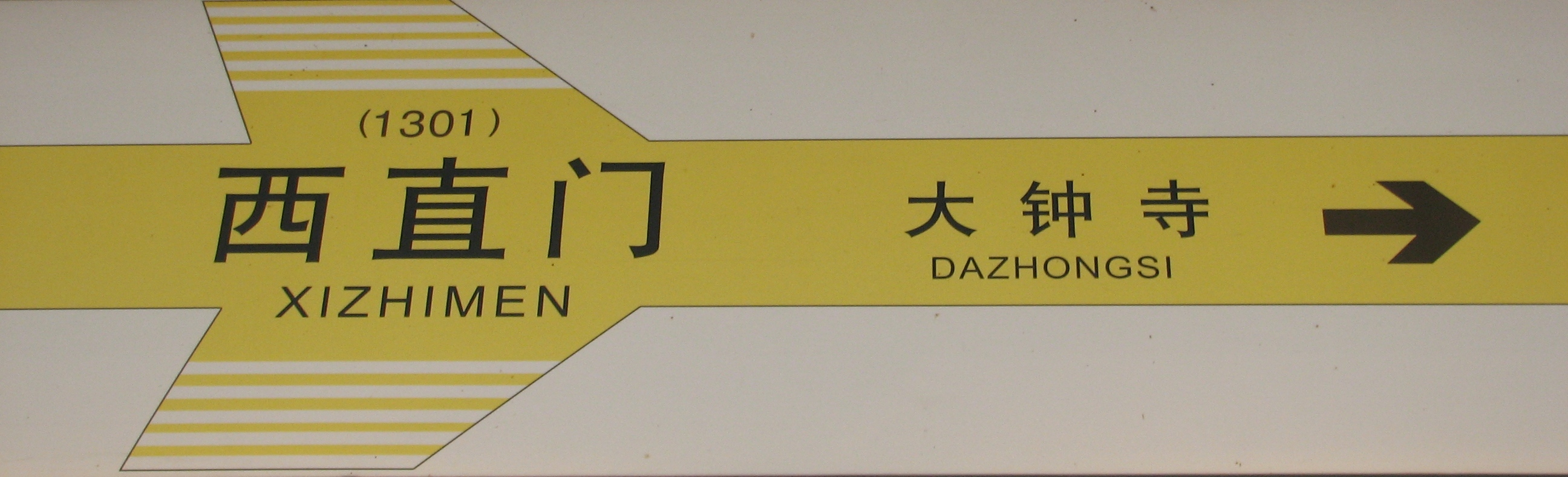
Platform sign at Xizhimen Station marking Dazhongsi-bound Line 13 train

Line 13's route is shaped like a horseshoe over northern Beijing. From Xizhimen in Xicheng District, Line 13 heads north, running alongside the Beijing-Baotou Railway into Haidian. After three stops in the bustling university district -- Dazhong Si, Zhichun Lu (transfer to Line 10), and Wudaokou—Line 13 leaves the 5th Ring Road and enters the suburbs of northern Haidian. At Xi'erqi, Line 13 meets the Changping Line, and turns east, following the southern edge of Changping District for three stops (Longze, Huilongguan, and Huoying), before turning to the southeast. It enters Chaoyang District at Lishuiqiao (transfer to Line 5) and curls southwest after Beiyuan onto the Beijing-Chengde Expressway. At Wangjingxi, Line 13 intersects with Line 15. After entering the 3rd Ring Road at Guangximen, the line runs straight south, along the remnants of the eastern earthen wall to Liufang. Then, Line 13 goes underground to Dongzhimen in Dongcheng District where transfers are available to Line 2 and the Capital Airport Express.

== Stations (from West to East) ==
Station Name		Connections	Nearby Bus Stops	Travel Time	Distance km		Location
English	Chinese	Connections	Nearby Bus Stops	Travel Time	Distance km		Location
Xizhimen	西直门	2 4 Huairou–Miyun; VAP	7 16 21 26 27 44 69 80 87 105 111 200 305 332 347 362 375 387 534 604 618 632 651 686 693 夜8 夜20 专216	0:00	0.000	0.000	Xicheng
Dazhong Si	大钟寺	12 (OSI)	87 88 94 300 302 315 361 368 425 606 658 695 921 夜30 专168 专216	0:03	2.839	2.839	Haidian
Zhichun Lu	知春路	10	311 319 386 579 601 630 653 671 专168	0:05	1.206	4.045	Haidian
Wudao Kou	五道口		86 307 331 375 398 508 549 630 专12	0:08	1.829	5.874	Haidian
Shangdi	上地		447 449 623 681 专60	0:13	4.866	10.740	Haidian
Qinghe railway station	清河站	Changping; QIP; Huairou–Miyun	320 333 495 603 623 夜4 专29 专139	0:15	1.036	11.776	Haidian
Xi'erqi	西二旗	Changping	333 362 367 509 608 636 902 932 963 通医专线11 专128	0:16	1.545	13.321	Haidian
Longze	龙泽		428 441 463 519 543 625 996 昌19 昌21 昌58 快速直达专线128 专80 专102 专103	0:21	3.623	16.944	Changping
Huilong Guan	回龙观		460 557 560 636 681 880快 887 专89 专101 专102 专121	0:24	1.423	18.367	Changping
Huoying	霍营	8 ( S2 via HKP)	371 462 478 551 558 606 607 681 专52 专192	0:28	2.110	20.477	Changping
Lishui Qiao	立水桥	5	301 319 426 430 465 558 617 621 628 905 966 984 BRT3(快速公交3) 昌27专 快速直达专线60 快速直达专线168	0:33	4.785	25.262	Chaoyang
Bei Yuan	北苑		141 466 484 530 596 621 653 695 966 夜26 专81 专107 专164 专197	0:36	2.272	27.534	Chaoyang
Wangjingxi	望京西	15 17	450 538 547 571 851 854 866 907 928 987 快速直达专线197 专112	0:44	6.720	34.254	Chaoyang
Shaoyaoju	芍药居	10	119 515 547 567 696 942 快速直达专线41 快速直达专线172 专22	0:47	2.152	36.406	Chaoyang
Guangxi Men	光熙门	12	95 130 300 302 368 379 547 596 604 641 671 916快 942 980快 快速直达专线41 夜30	0:49	1.110	37.516	Chaoyang
Liufang	柳芳		104 110 115 123 130 419 夜24 专26	0:51	1.135	38.651	Chaoyang
Dongzhimen	东直门	2 Capital Airport	18 24 44 75 106 107 117 123 130 132 135 142 200 359 401 404 413 416 612 850快 852 852快 915 916快 918 935快 942 980快 快速直达专线72 快速直达专线102 通医专线3 夜20 专26	0:53	1.769	40.420	Dongcheng

From Xizhimen to Dongzhimen, line 13 had station numbers from 1301 to 1316, except for Qinghe Railway Station. The station numbers in Beijing Subway for new subway stations were cancelled before Line 5 opened in October 2007.

== History ==
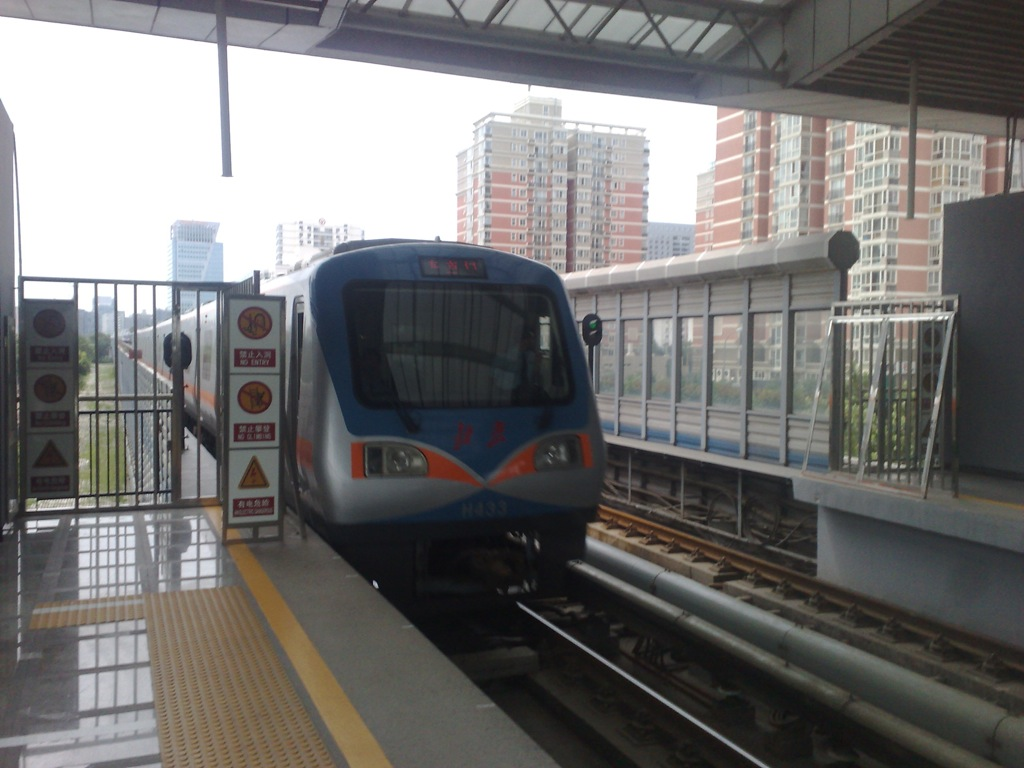
Line 13 train entering Wudaokou station in 2008

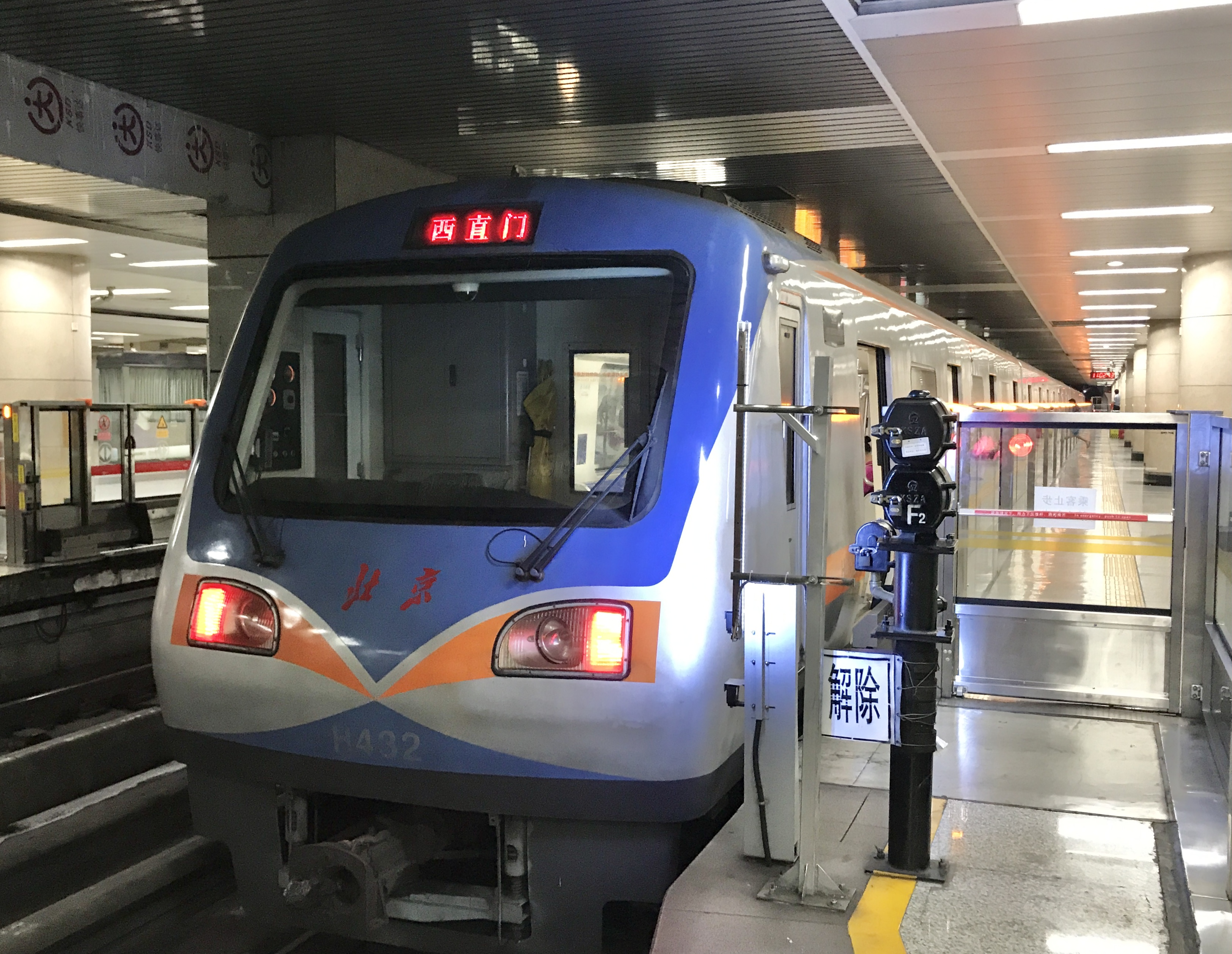
pre-refurbishment DKZ5 stock stopping at Dongzhimen Station in 2017

Line 13 was opened in two sections: The western section between Xizhimen and Huoying was opened on September 28, 2002; the eastern section from Huoying to Dongzhimen was opened on January 28, 2003. Despite being numbered 13, the line was only the third subway line to enter into operation as lines 3 to 12 were still under planning at line 13's opening. It was the first Beijing Subway line to adopt Yikatong, the electronic farecard, at the end of 2003.

Segment	Commencement	Length	Station(s)	Name
Xizhimen — Huoying	28 September 2002	20.62 km (12.81 mi)	9	Western section
Huoying — Dongzhimen	28 January 2003	20 km (12 mi)	7	Eastern section
Xi'erqi (new)	25 December 2010	Infill station	1	Xi'erqi replacement project
Xi'erqi (old)	25 December 2010	Decommissioned	-1	Xi'erqi replacement project
Qinghe Railway Station	30 December 2019	Infill station	1	

== Future development ==
On November 22, 2018, the Beijing Municipal Commission of Planning and Natural Resources began the 30-day public consultation of a plan to split Line 13 into two lines, temporarily named Line 13A and Line 13B. This was later changed to Line 18 and a new shortened Line 13 respectively. According to the plan, the existing Line 13 will be split between Xi'erqi station and Huilongguan station, to form two L-shaped lines intersecting in the north of the city. Passengers can use a cross-platform interchange between Line 13 and Line 18 at Longzexi station, an underground station in the west of the Jingzang Expressway (this station will only open for Line 18 in 2025. Line 13 at this station will be delayed to 2027).

=== Line 13-18 temporary through service (Line 18 initial section, 2025-2026) ===
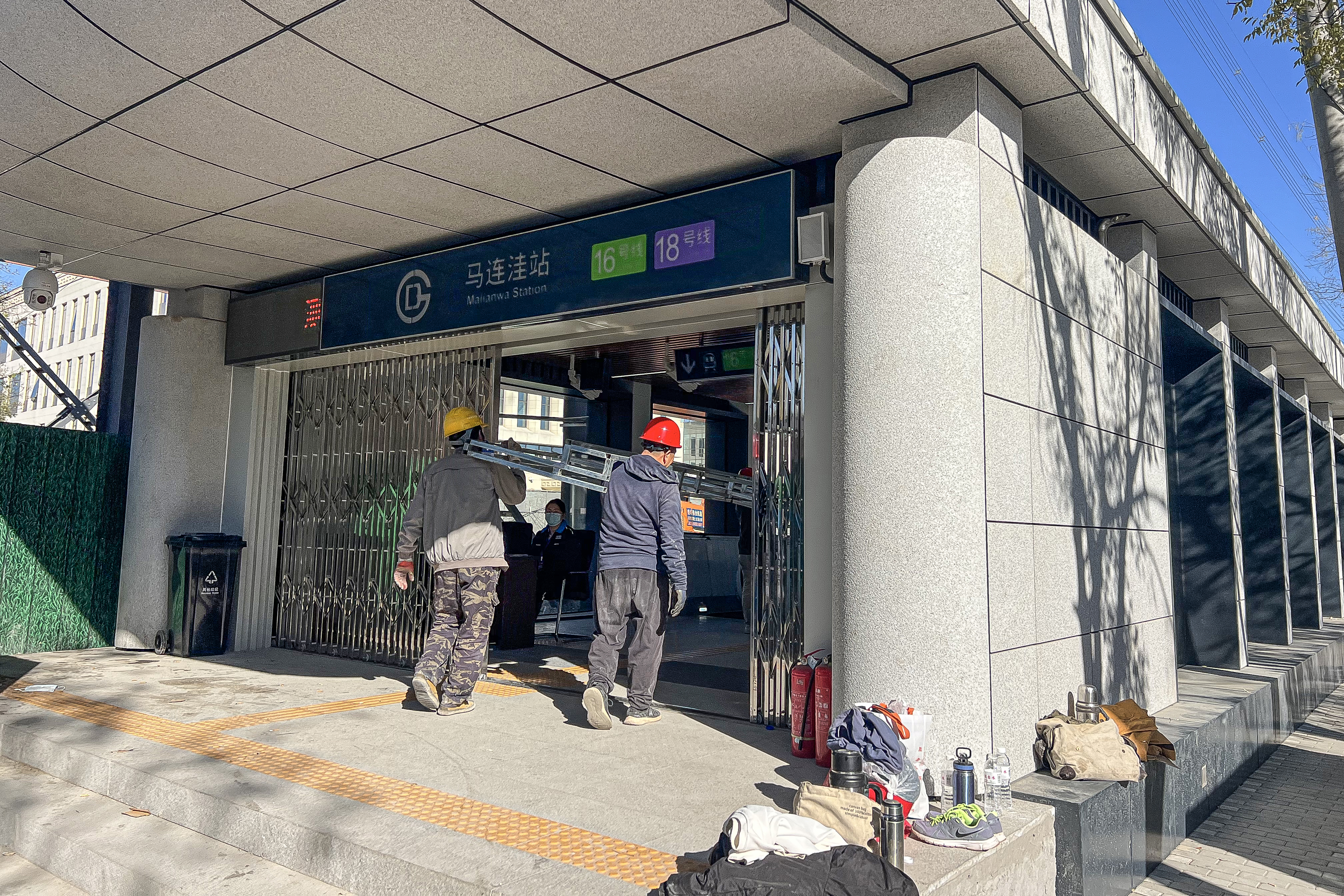
Malianwa station featuring the formal sign of Line 18

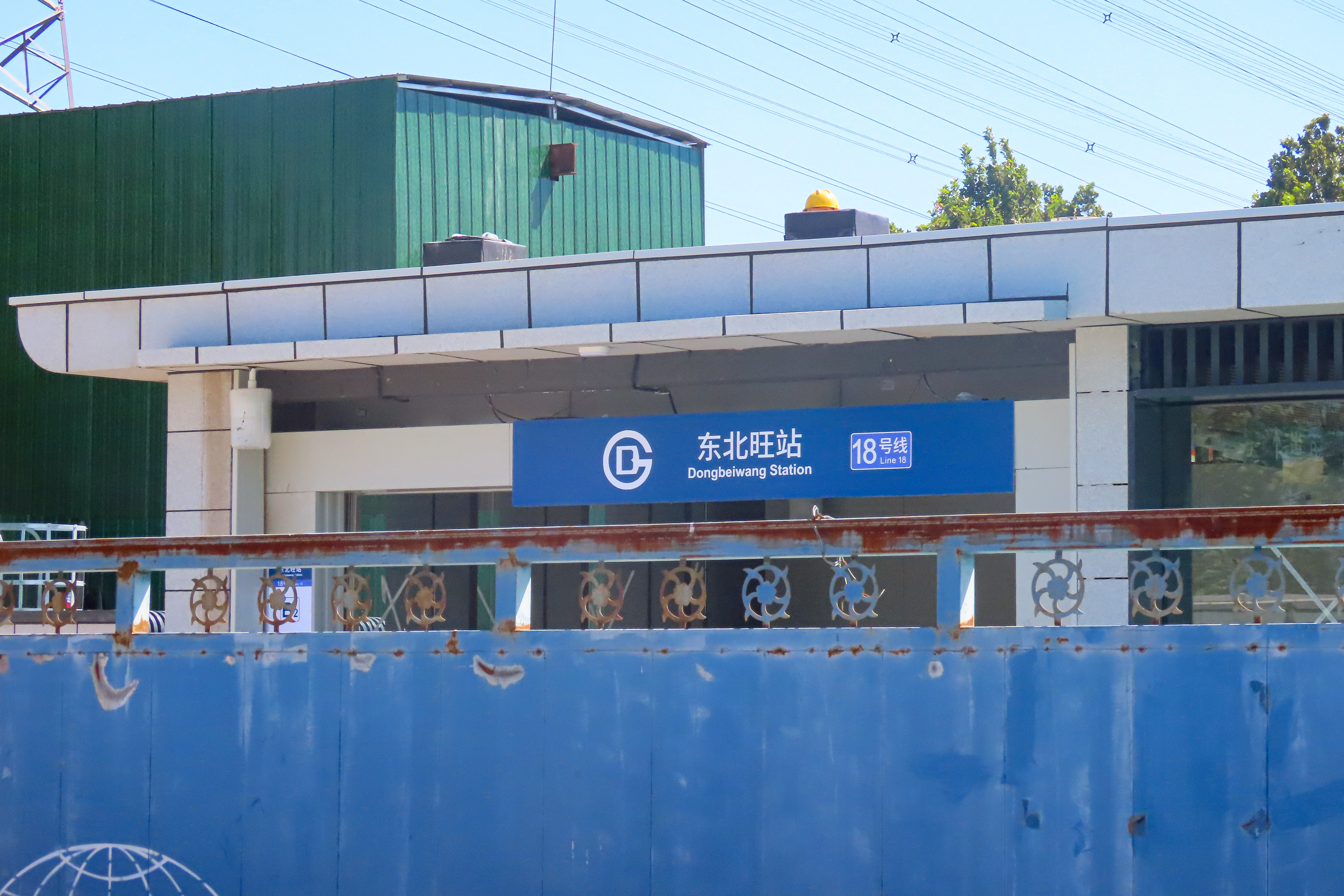
Interim sign of Dongbeiwang station featuring Line 18 markings

In 2024, Beijing Infrastructure Investment (BII) suggested that, due to slow status of some new stations, both new sections of Line 13A and 13B will temporary be pieced together as a new line, tentatively called "Yizi line of Line 13" (13号线一字线). The Yizi line will start operation in 2025-2026. The line is expected to open in late 2025. It will be 19.8 km in length with 11 stations. The line will be fully underground.

In June 2025, CRCC confirmed to use Line 13-18 north section through line (13-18北段贯通线). Sometime after, this was renamed to Line 18 (initial section).

Station Name		Connections	Nearby Bus Stops	Distance km	Location
English	Chinese	Connections	Nearby Bus Stops	Distance km	Location
Malianwa	马连洼	16	305 328 333 362 438 449 476 509 518 575 608 623 651 932		Haidian
Shangdi Software Park	上地软件园		495 909 专143		Haidian
Dongbeiwang	东北旺		333 365 367 446 447 509 902 963 982 快速直达专线39 快速直达专线46 快速直达专线98 快速直达专线111 快速直达专线138 通医专线11		Haidian
Longzexi	龙泽西		344 345 367 371 407 608 617 618 625 夜38		Changping
Huilongguan Xidajie	回龙观西大街		344 367 441 460 461 519 560 618 快速直达专线203 夜38 专101 专102 专121		Changping
Wenhualu	文华路		367 441 460 461 462 551 557 618 夜38		Changping
Huilongguan Dongdajie	回龙观东大街	8	367 441 462 478 558 607 618 636 681 996 C113 快速直达专线203 夜38 专21 专40 专52 专78 专101 专192 专193		Changping
Huoyingdong	霍营东		367 441 558 618 636 快速直达专线202 快速直达专线203 夜38 专52		Changping
Tiantongyuan	天通苑	5	319 426 430 432 464 465 520 621 905 966 984 BRT3(快速公交3) 昌27专 快速直达专线60 专58 专104 专119 专133 专136 专137		Changping
Taipingzhuang	太平庄		319 428 432 933 快速直达专线168 快速直达专线169 专48 专104 专119		Changping
Tiantongyuandong	天通苑东	17	301 386 432 530 596 628 夜26 专58 专119		Changping

=== Line 18 (after 2027) ===
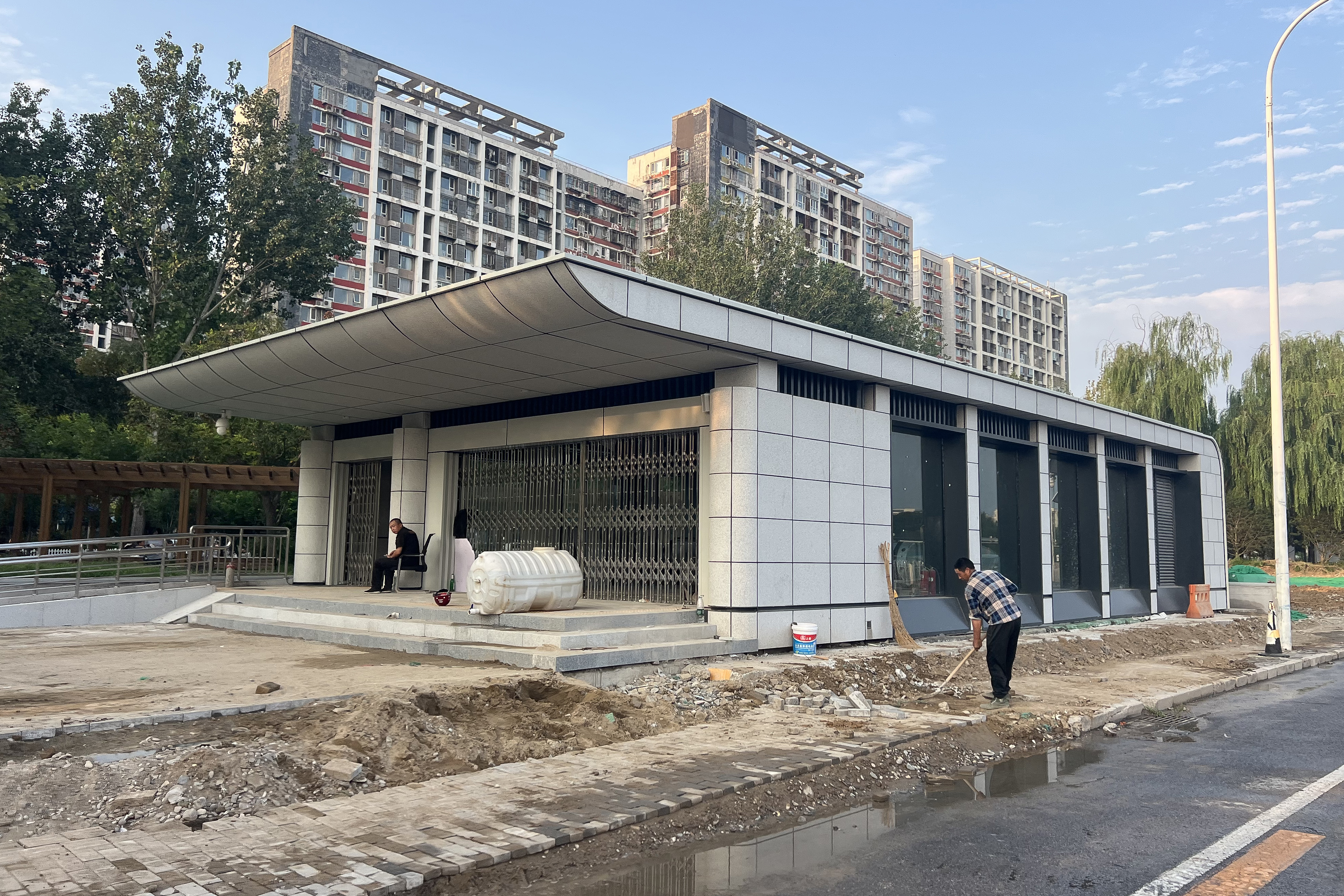
Exit A of Wenhua Lu station in 2025.

Line 18 (planning name Line 13A) under construction will have a total length of 31.3 km (19.4 mi) with 19 stations, including 19.54 km (12.14 mi) of new line and 13 new stations. The line will be built to support expanded 8-car Type B trains.

Station Name		Connections	Distance km	Location
English	Chinese	Connections	Distance km	Location
Chegongzhuang	车公庄	2 6		Xicheng
Xizhimen (Rebuild)	西直门	2 4		Xicheng
Sidao Kou	四道口			Haidian
Dazhong Si	大钟寺	12		Haidian
Zhichun Lu	知春路	10		Haidian
Baofu Si	保福寺			Haidian
Wudao Kou	五道口			Haidian
Qinghua Donglu Xikou	清华东路西口	15		Haidian
Shangdi	上地			Haidian
Qinghe railway station	清河站	Changping; QIP		Haidian
Xi'erqi	西二旗	Changping		Haidian
Longzexi	龙泽西	13		Changping
Huilongguan Xidajie	回龙观西大街			Changping
Wenhualu	文华路			Changping
Huilongguan Dongdajie	回龙观东大街	8		Changping
Huoyingdong	霍营东			Changping
Tiantongyuan	天通苑	5		Changping
Taipingzhuang	太平庄			Changping
Tiantongyuandong	天通苑东	17		Changping

=== New Line 13 (after 2027) ===
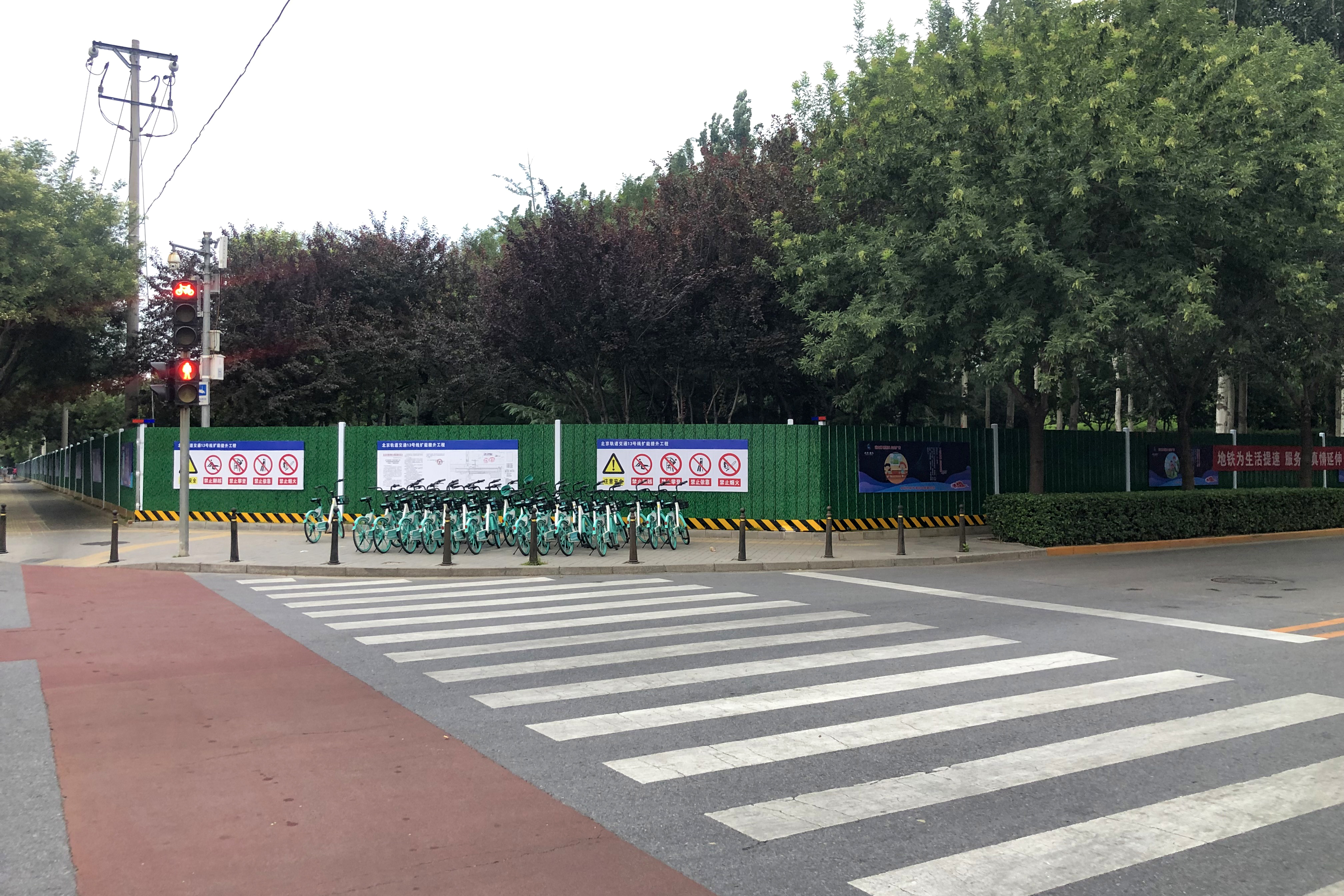
Construction site of Shangdi Ruanjianyuan station, Line 13B, at ZPark (Zhongguancun Software Park) in August 2021

The new Line 13 (planning name Line 13B) will have a total length of 32.2 km (20.0 mi) with 15 stations, including 9.0 km (5.6 mi) of new line and 6 new stations. The line will continue to use 6-car Type B trains.

Station Name		Connections	Distance km	Location
English	Chinese	Connections	Distance km	Location
Malianwa	马连洼	16		Haidian
Shangdi Software Park	上地软件园			Haidian
Dongbeiwang	东北旺			Haidian
Longzexi	龙泽西	18		Changping
Longze (Rebuild)	龙泽			Changping
Huilong Guan	回龙观			Changping
Huoying	霍营	8		Changping
Dongxiao Kou	东小口			Changping
Lishui Qiao	立水桥	5		Chaoyang
Bei Yuan	北苑			Chaoyang
Wangjingxi	望京西	15 17		Chaoyang
Shaoyaoju	芍药居	10		Chaoyang
Guangxi Men	光熙门	12		Chaoyang
Liufang	柳芳			Chaoyang
Dongzhimen	东直门	2 Capital Airport		Dongcheng

== Rolling stock ==
The line uses 6-car type B rolling stock.

=== Current ===
Model	Image	Manufacturer	Year built	Year refurbished	Amount in service	Fleet numbers	Depot
DKZ5		CRRC Changchun Railway Vehicles; Beijing Subway Rolling Stock Equipment	2002	2015–2018	55	H401, H403–H456	Huilongguan
DKZ6		CRRC Changchun Railway Vehicles	2002	2015	1	H402	Huilongguan
ZBM15		Beijing Subway Rolling Stock Equipment	2023-2024		44	13 001–13 044	Huilongguan; Xiaoxinzhuang (after the split project)

=== Former ===
Model	Image	Manufacturer	Year built	Year Retired	Number Made	Fleet numbers	Depot	Notes
DK3G		CRRC Changchun Railway Vehicles	1971	2003	14	H101–H114	Huilongguan	
DK8		CRRC Changchun Railway Vehicles	1986	2002	4	H115–H118	Huilongguan	
M		Tokyu Car Corporation	1984	2003	1	H301	Huilongguan	
DKZ1		CRRC Changchun Railway Vehicles	1998	2003	1	H302	Huilongguan	
BD8		Beijing Subway Rolling Stock Equipment	2000	2003	1	H303	Huilongguan	Formerly used by Tianjin Metro.
DKZ10		CRRC Changchun Railway Vehicles	2005	2010	1	H457	Huilongguan	Retired due to reliability issues.

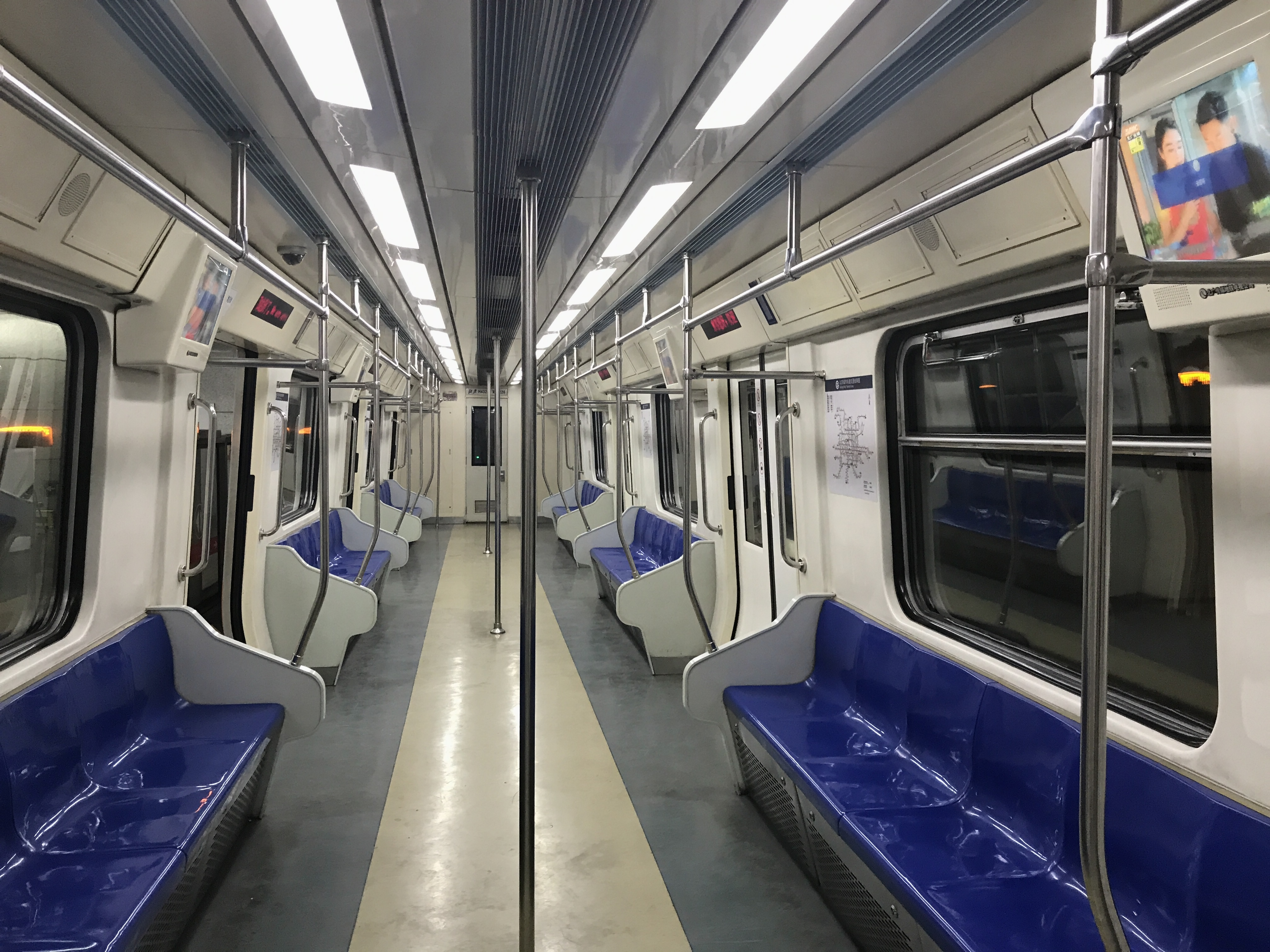
Interior of a DKZ5 stock (pre-refurbishment)

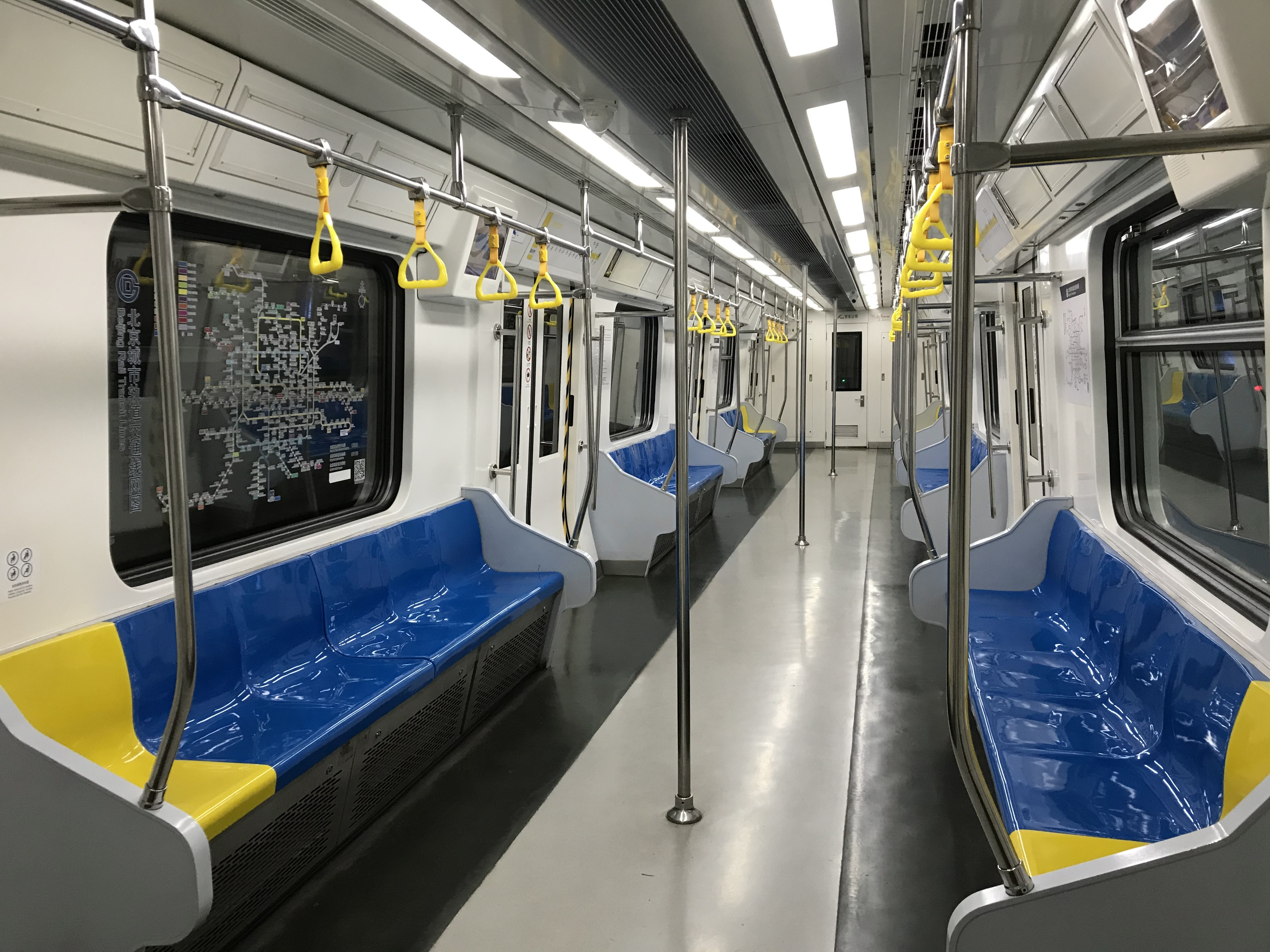
Interior of a refurbished DKZ5 stock
