= Xibeiwang =

Xibeiwang Town 西北旺镇
- Town
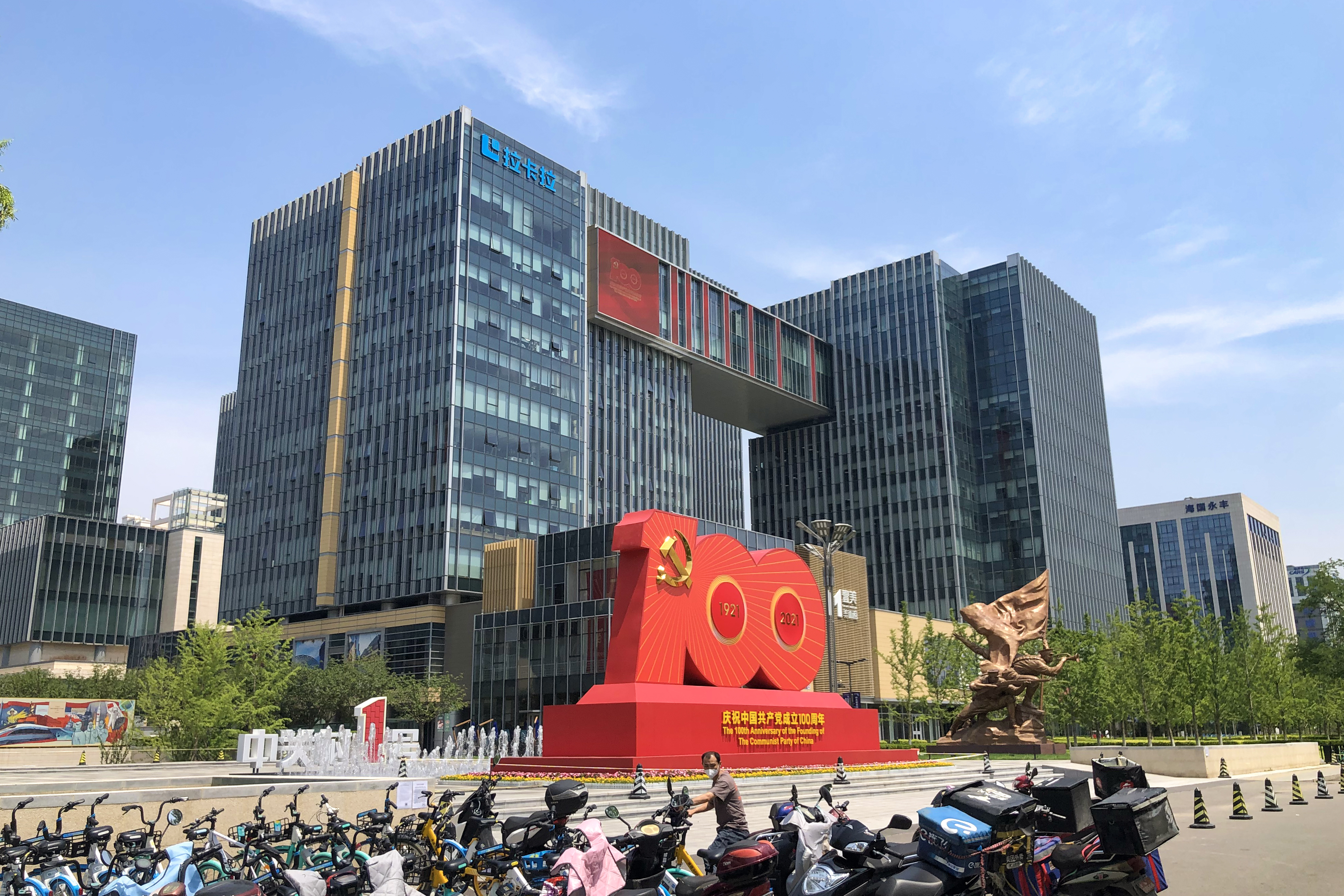
- Zhongguancun No.1 Building Group within the Town, 2021

- Location within Beijing Location within China
- Coordinates: 40°02′26″N 116°17′15″E
- Country: China
- Municipality: Beijing
- District: Haidian
- Village-level Divisions: 17 communities 8 villages 7 residential area

Area
  - Total: 50.94 km^{2} (19.67 sq mi)

Population (2020)
  - Total: 164,795
  - Density: 3,235/km^{2} (8,379/sq mi)
- Time zone: UTC+8 (China Standard)
- Postal code: 100094
- Area code: 010

Xibeiwang Town (Chinese: 西北旺镇; pinyin: Xīběiwàng Zhèn) is a town on the northeast of Haidian District, Beijing, China. It borders Shigezhuang Subdistrict, Shahe and Shangzhuang Towns to its north, Huilongguan, Qinghe, Shangdi and Malianwa Subdistricts to its east, Qinglongqiao and Xiangshan Subdistricts to its south, Wenquan and Sujiatuo Towns to its west. The population of Xibeiwangg was 164,795 in 2020.

The name Xibeiwang is a corruption of Xibaiwang (Chinese: 西百望; lit. 'West Baiwang'), a name of this region given for its location west of Baiwang Mountain. The mountain, in turn, gets its name for the fact that its peak can supposedly still be visible from a hundred Chinese miles away.

== History ==
Timeline of Xibeiwang Area
Year	Status	
1949	Xibeiwang Township, part of the 16th District of Peiping	Dongbeiwang Township, part of the 16th District of Peiping
1957	Xibeiwang Township	Established as Nongda Farm
1858	Incorporated into Yongfeng People's Commune	
1961	Split into two, western part formed Yongfengtun People's Commune	Split into two, eastern part formed Dongbeiwang People's Commune
1970	Renamed to Yongfeng People's Commune	Split into two, eastern part formed Dongbeiwang People's Commune
1978	Merged to form Sino-Japanese Friendship People's Commune	
1979	Renamed to Yongfeng People's Commune	
1984	Split into two, western part formed Yongfeng Township	Split into two, eastern part formed Dongbeiwang Township
2003	Merged to form Xibeiwangg Town	
2011	Became an area while retaining the status of a town	

== Administrative Divisions ==
As of 2021, Xibeiwang Area included 32 subdivisions, with 17 being communities, 8 being villages and 7 being residential areas for stock economic cooperatives:

Administrative division code	Subdivision names	Name transliteration	Type
110108028003	六里屯	Liulitun	Community
110108028004	亮甲店	Liangjiadian	Community
110108028005	屯佃	Tundian	Community
110108028006	大牛坊	Daniufang	Community
110108028007	小辛店	Xiaoxindian	Community
110108028008	友谊嘉园	Youyi Jiayuan	Community
110108028009	西六里屯	Xi Liulitun	Community
110108028010	航天城	Hangtiancheng	Community
110108028011	西山林语	Xishan Linyu	Community
110108028012	冷泉	Lengquan	Community
110108028013	韩家川	Hanjiachuan	Community
110108028014	唐家岭	Tangjialing	Community
110108028015	土井	Tujing	Community
110108028016	航天城五院	Hangtiancheng Wuyuan	Community
110108028017	燕保辛店家园	Yanbao Xindian Jiayuan	Community
110108028018	青棠湾	Qingtangwan	Community
110108028019	天阅西山	Tianyue Xishan	Community
110108028203	西北旺	Xibeiwang	Village
110108028204	韩家川	Hanjiachuan	Village
110108028205	冷泉	Lengquan	Village
110108028208	亮甲店	Liangjiadian	Village
110108028210	屯佃	Tundian	Village
110108028211	永丰屯	Yongfengtun	Village
110108028213	皇后店	Huanghoudian	Village
110108028214	西玉河	Xiyuhe	Village
110108028500	唐家岭村	Tangjialingcun	Residential Area
110108028501	土井村	Tujingcun	Residential Area
110108028502	东北旺村	Dongbeiwangcun	Residential Area
110108028503	六里屯村	Liulituncun	Residential Area
110108028504	大牛坊村	Daniufangcun	Residential Area
110108028505	东玉河村	Dongyuhecun	Residential Area
110108028506	小牛坊村	Xiaoniufangcun	Residential Area

== See also ==
- List of township-level divisions of Beijing
