= Shangdi Software Park station =

Beijing Subway Line 18 station

Shangdi Software Park 上地软件园
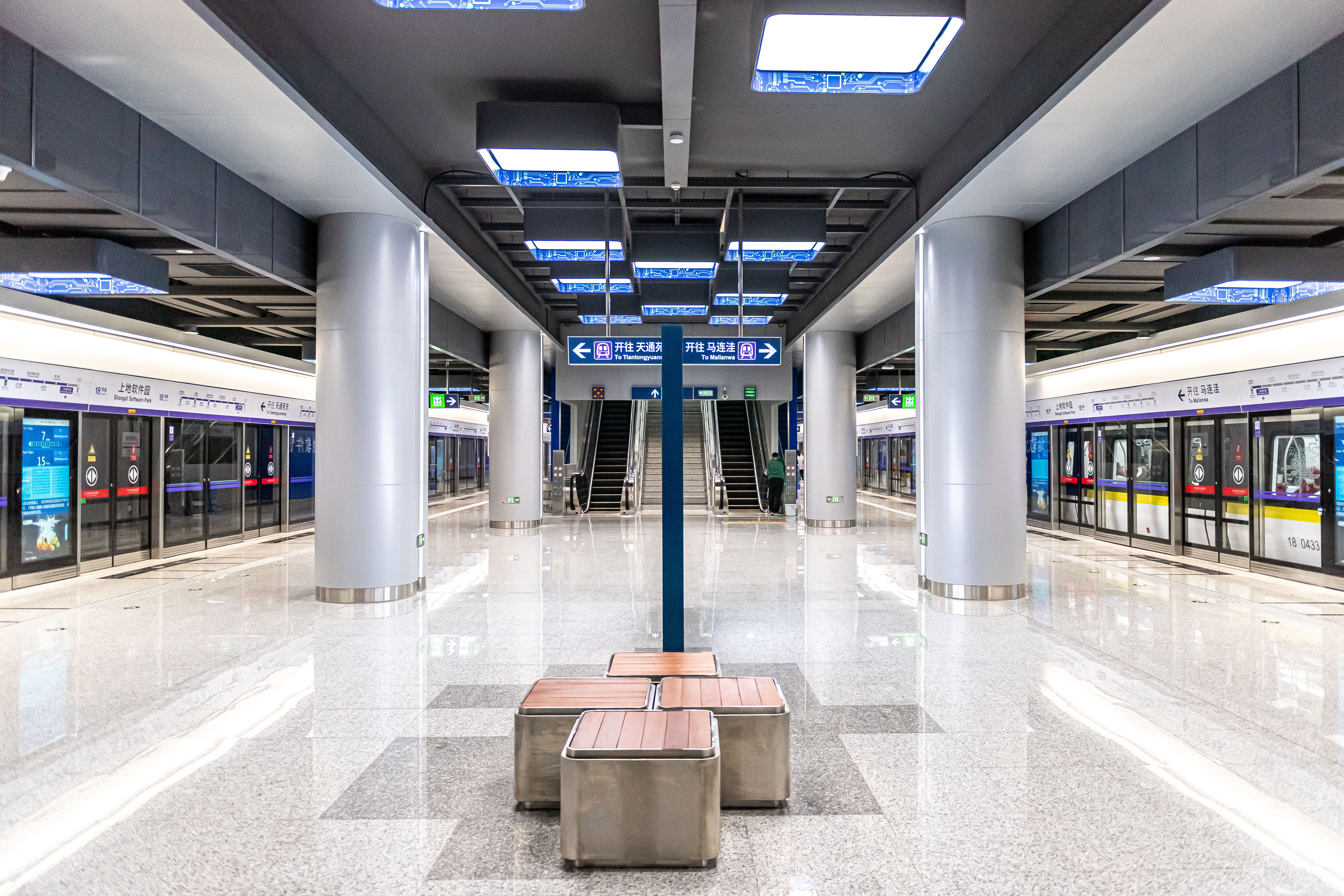
- Platform

Chinese name
- Simplified Chinese: 上地软件园站
- Traditional Chinese: 上地軟件園站
Transcriptions
Standard Mandarin
- Hanyu Pinyin: Shàngdì Ruǎnjiànyuán zhàn

General information
- Location: East side of the intersection of Dongbeiwang West Road (东北旺西路) and Software Park South Street (软件园南街), border of Malianwa Subdistrict and Shangdi Subdistricts; Haidian District, Beijing; China
- Coordinates: 40°02′33″N 116°16′50″E
- System: Beijing Subway station
- Operator: Beijing Mass Transit Railway Operation Corporation Limited
- Lines: Line 18; Line 13 (2027)
- Platforms: 2 (1 island platform)
- Tracks: 2

Construction
- Structure type: Underground
- Accessible: Yes

History
- Opened: December 27, 2025; 7 months ago

Services
Preceding station	Beijing Subway	Following station
Malianwa Terminus	Line 18	Dongbeiwang towards Tiantongyuandong
Location
- Location within Beijing

Shangdi Software Park station (simplified Chinese: 上地软件园站; traditional Chinese: 上地軟件園站; pinyin: Shàngdì Ruǎnjiànyuán zhàn) is a station on Line 18 of the Beijing Subway, which opened on December 27, 2025.

In December 2027, the station will be transferred to become part of the new Line 13.

== Location and name ==
The station is located under the east side of the intersection of Dongbeiwang West Road and Software Park South Street on the border of Malianwa Subdistrict and Shangdi Subdistricts in Haidian District. The name derives from the Zhongguancun Software Park (also commonly known as Shangdi Software Park) which the station serves.

== Station features ==
The station has an underground island platform.

=== Exits ===
The station has 3 exits, lettered A, B and C. Exit C is accessible via an elevator.

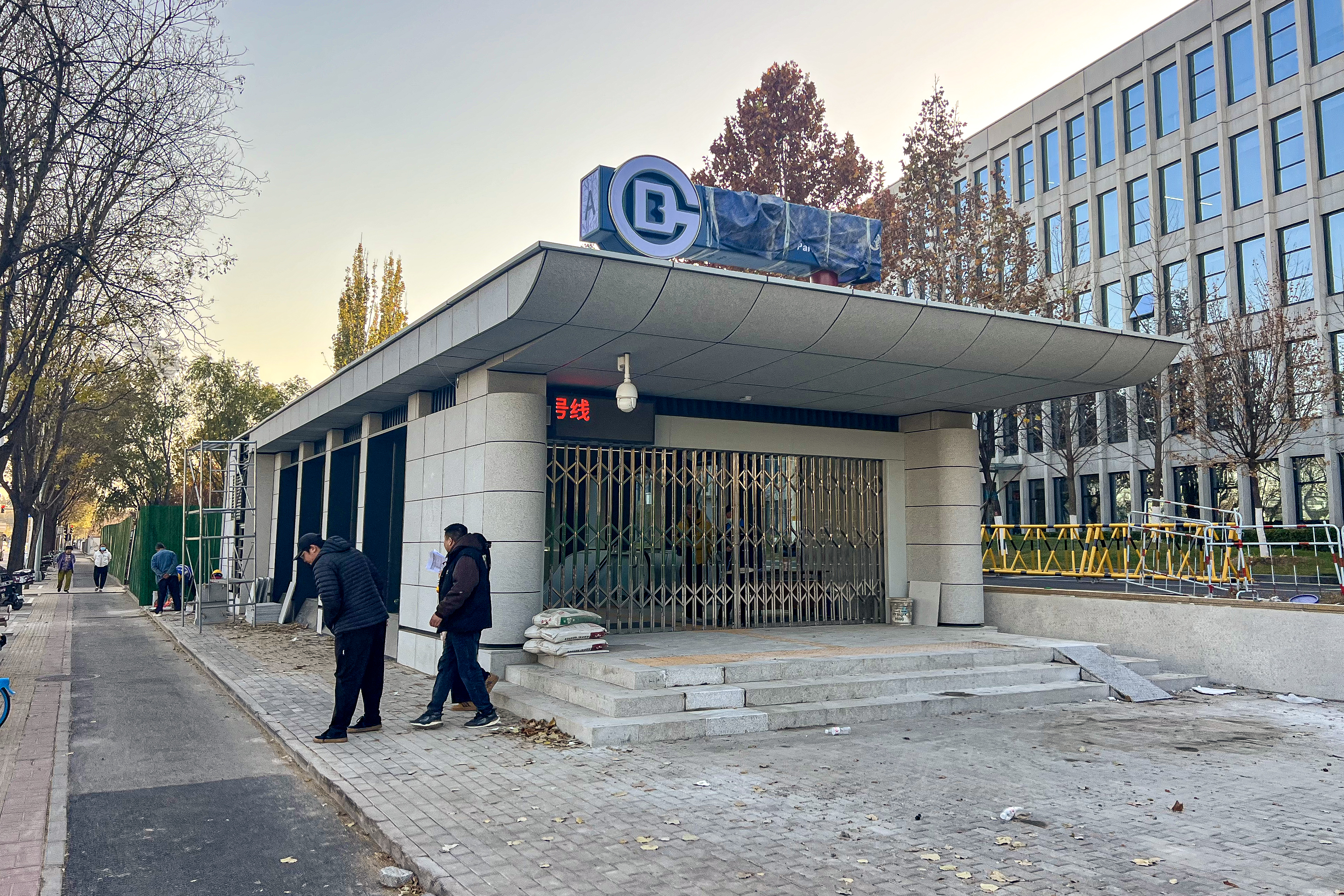
Exit A

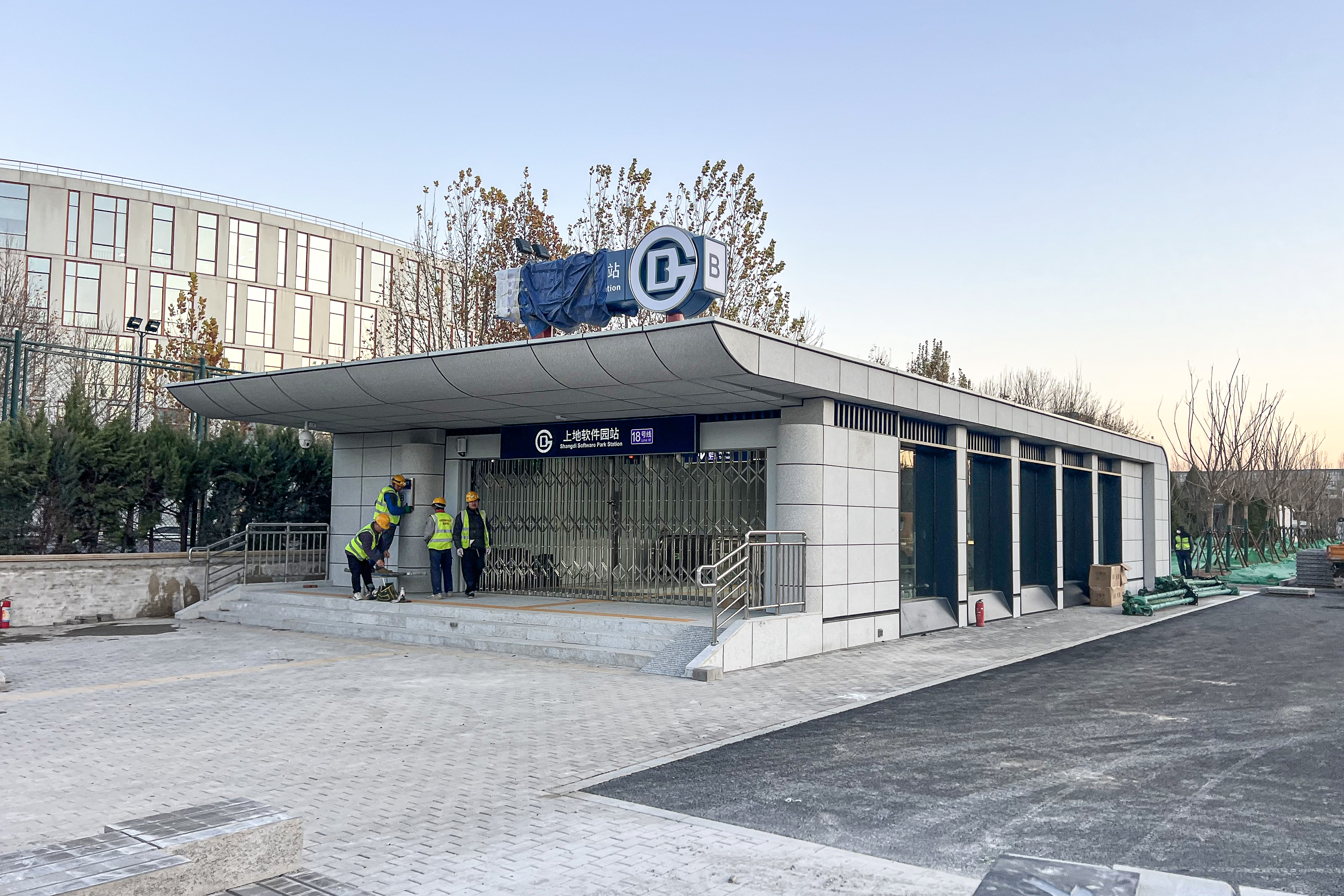
Exit B

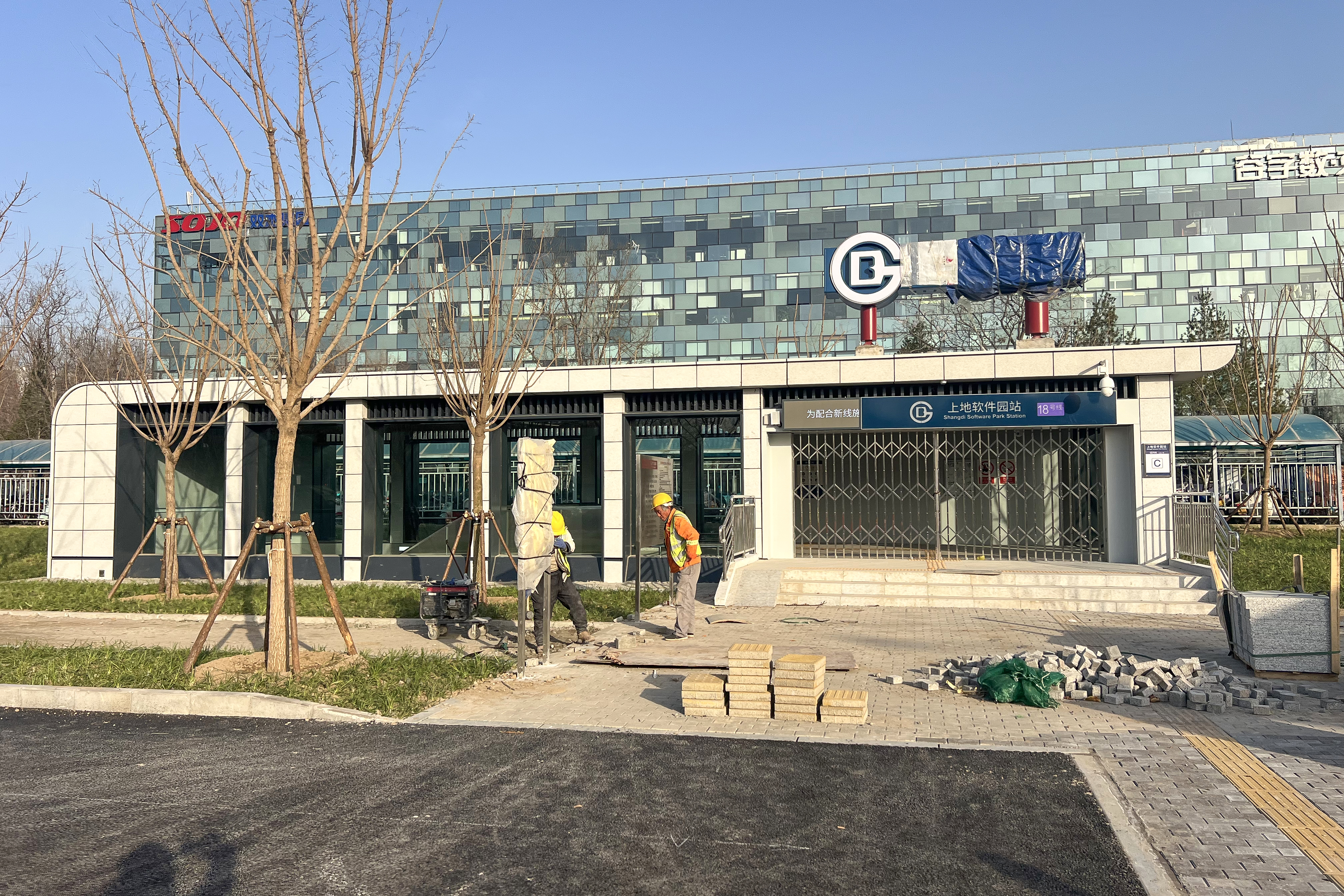
Exit C

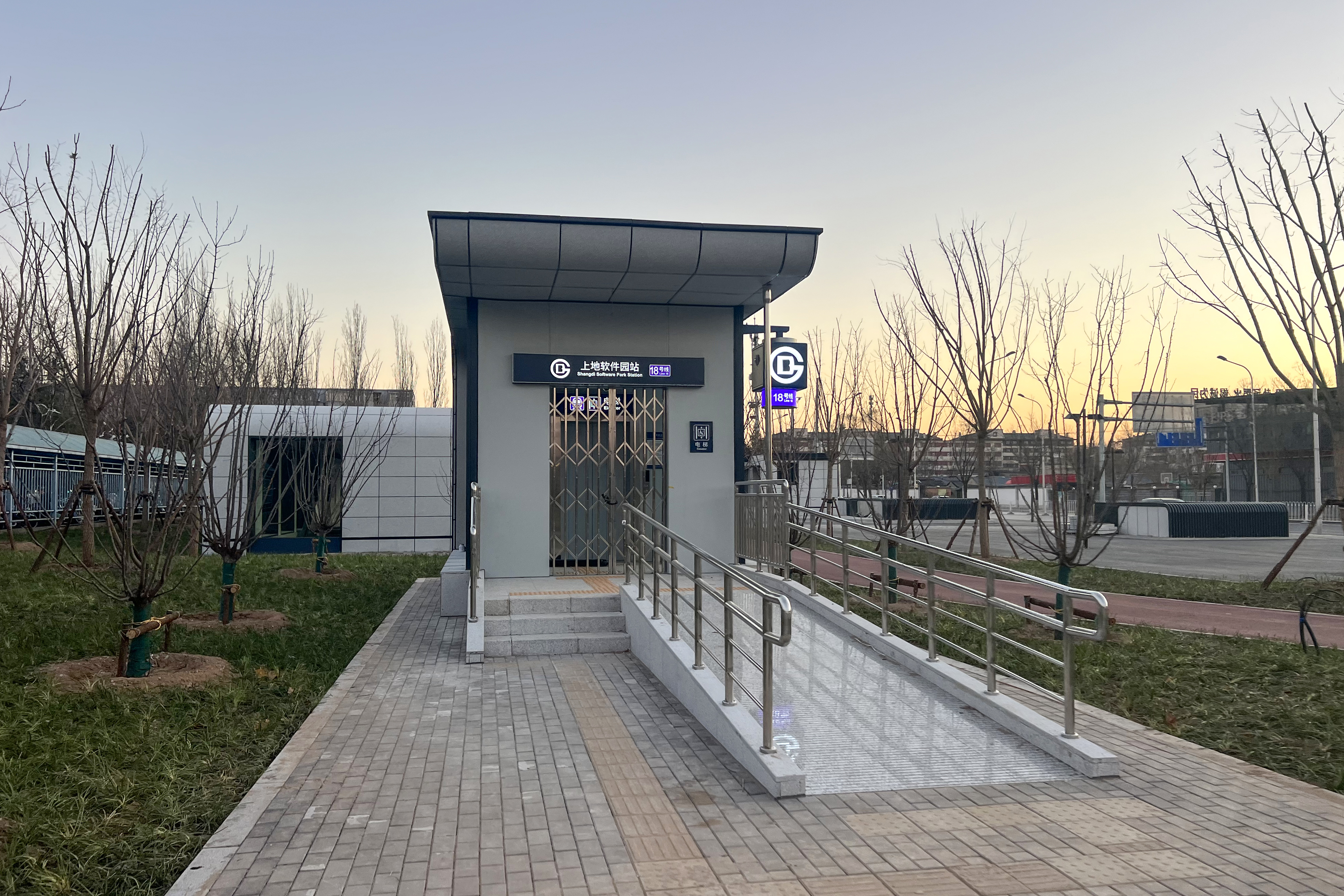
Exit C (elevator exit)

== History ==
On March 20, 2025, the Beijing Municipal Commission of Planning and Natural Resources announced the naming plan for the expansion and upgrading project of Line 13, and planned to name the station as Software Park station.

On April 5, 2025, the main structure of the station was topped out.

On August 18, 2025, the Beijing Municipal Commission of Planning and Natural Resources announced the station is officially named as Shangdi Software Park station, named after Zhongguancun Software Park (also known as Shangdi Software Park).
