= Dongbeiwang station =

Beijing Subway Line 18 station

Dongbeiwang 东北旺
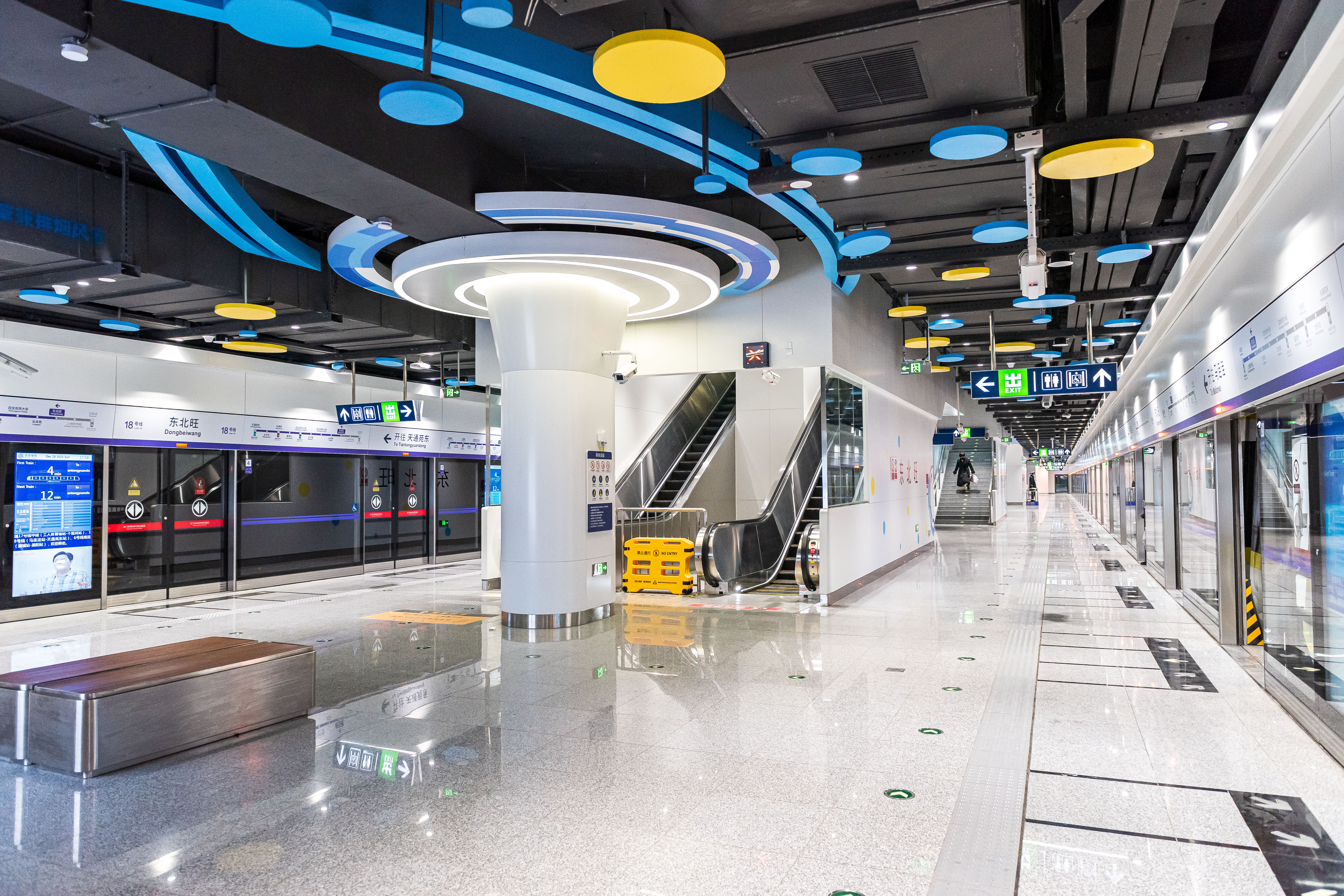
- Platform in December 2025

Chinese name
- Simplified Chinese: 东北旺站
- Traditional Chinese: 東北旺站
Transcriptions
Standard Mandarin
- Hanyu Pinyin: Dōngběiwàng zhàn

General information
- Location: Southeast side of the intersection of Houchangcun Road (后厂村路), Tangjialing Road (唐家岭路) and Software Park No. 4 Road (软件园四号路), Shangdi Subdistrict; Haidian District, Beijing; China
- Coordinates: 40°03′07″N 116°17′20″E
- System: Beijing Subway station
- Operator: Beijing Mass Transit Railway Operation Corporation Limited
- Lines: Line 18; Line 13 (2027)
- Platforms: 2 (1 island platform)
- Tracks: 2

Construction
- Structure type: Underground
- Accessible: Yes

History
- Opened: December 27, 2025; 7 months ago
- Former names: Houchangcun (后厂村)

Services
Preceding station	Beijing Subway	Following station
Shangdi Software Park towards Malianwa	Line 18	Longzexi towards Tiantongyuandong
Location
- Location within Beijing

Dongbeiwang station (simplified Chinese: 东北旺站; traditional Chinese: 東北旺站; pinyin: Dōngběiwàng zhàn) is a station on Line 18 of the Beijing Subway, which opened on December 27, 2025.

In December 2027, the station will be transferred to become part of the new Line 13.

== Location ==
The station is located under the southeast side of the intersection of Houchangcun Road, Tangjialing Road and Software Park No. 4 Road in Shangdi Subdistrict in Haidian District.

== Station features ==
The station has an underground island platform.

=== Exits ===
The station has 3 exits, lettered A, B1 and B2. All are located north of the main structure of the station, including one on the north side of Houchangcun Road (Exit B1) and two on the south side of Houchangcun Road (Exit A on the west side and Exit B2 on the east side). Exits A and B1 are accessible via elevators.

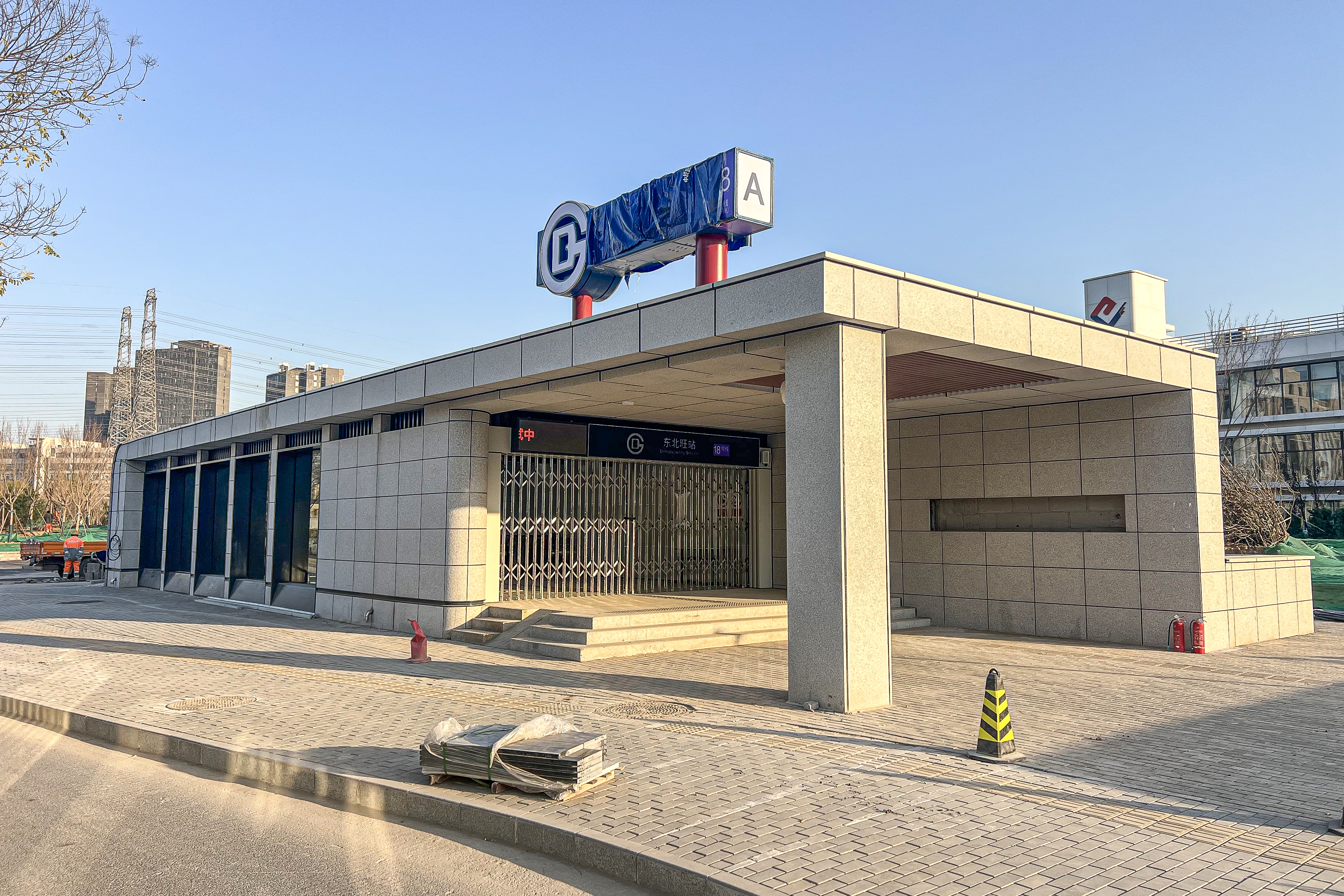
Exit A

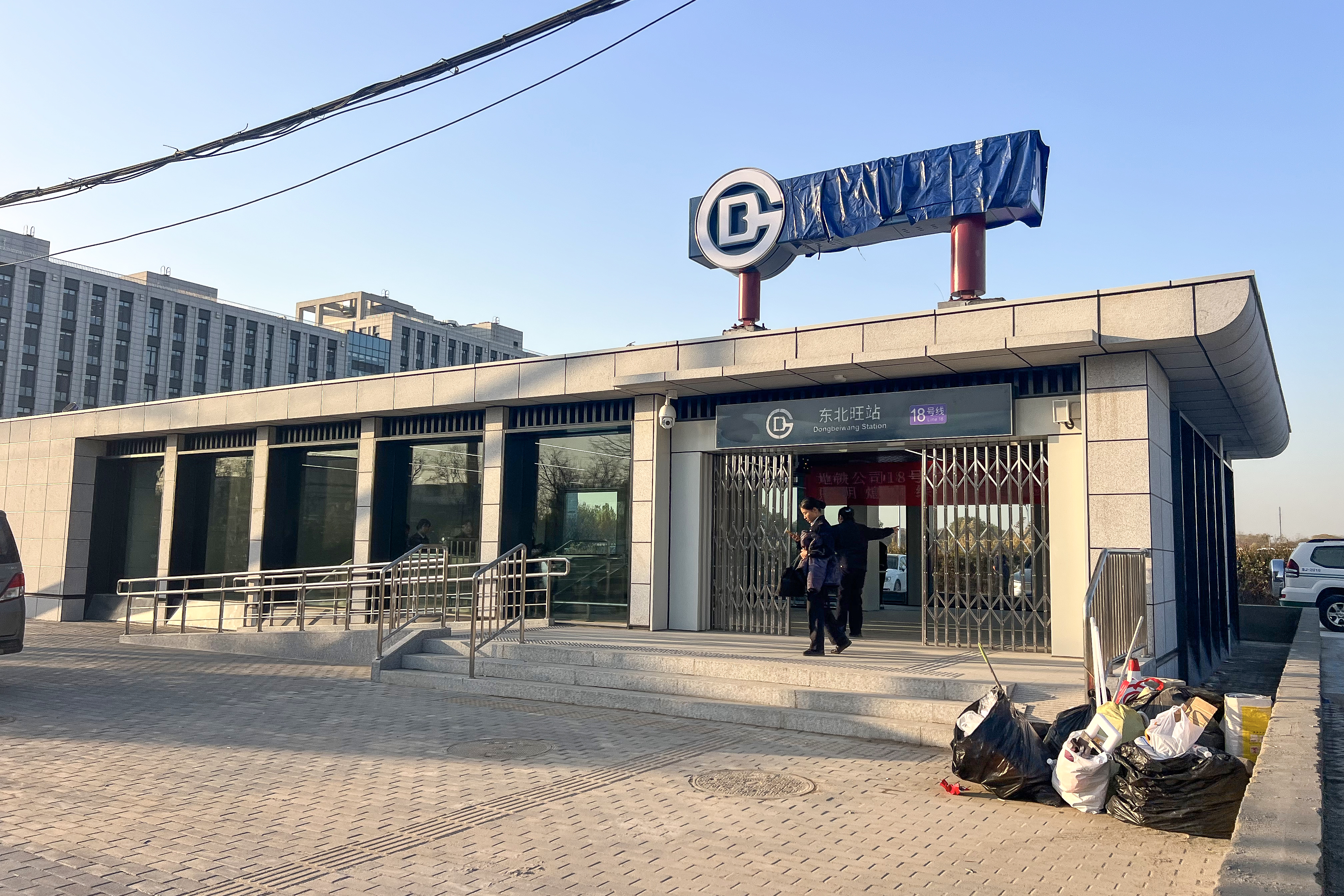
Exit B1

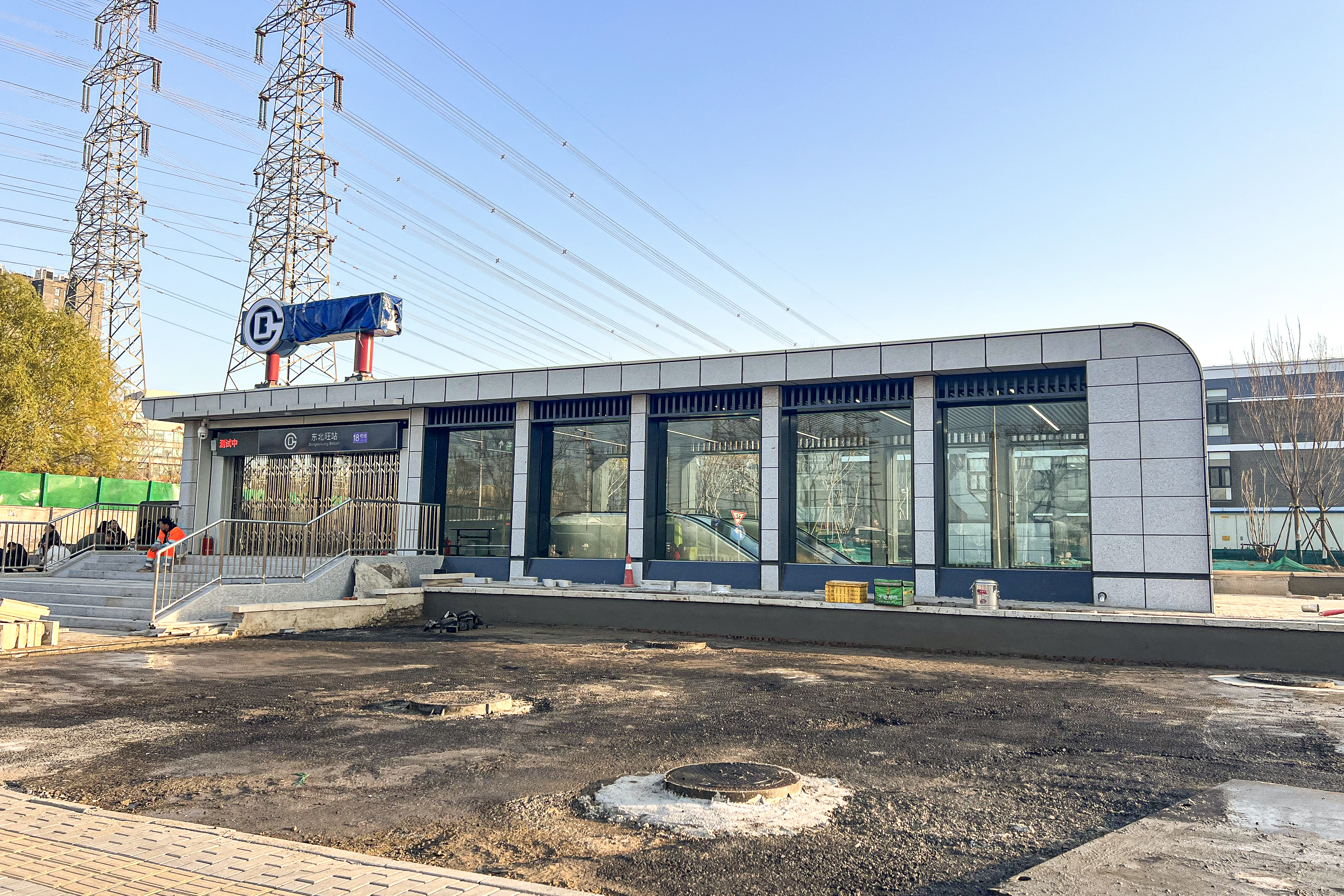
Exit B2

== History ==
The station was previously named as Houchangcun (Chinese: 后厂村; pinyin: Hòuchǎngcūn). On March 20, 2025, the Beijing Municipal Commission of Planning and Natural Resources announced the naming plan for the expansion and upgrading project of Line 13, and planned to name the station as Dongbeiwang.

On November 30, 2023, the main structure of the station was topped out.
