= Huilongguan Xidajie station =

Beijing Subway Line 18 station

Huilongguan Xidajie 回龙观西大街
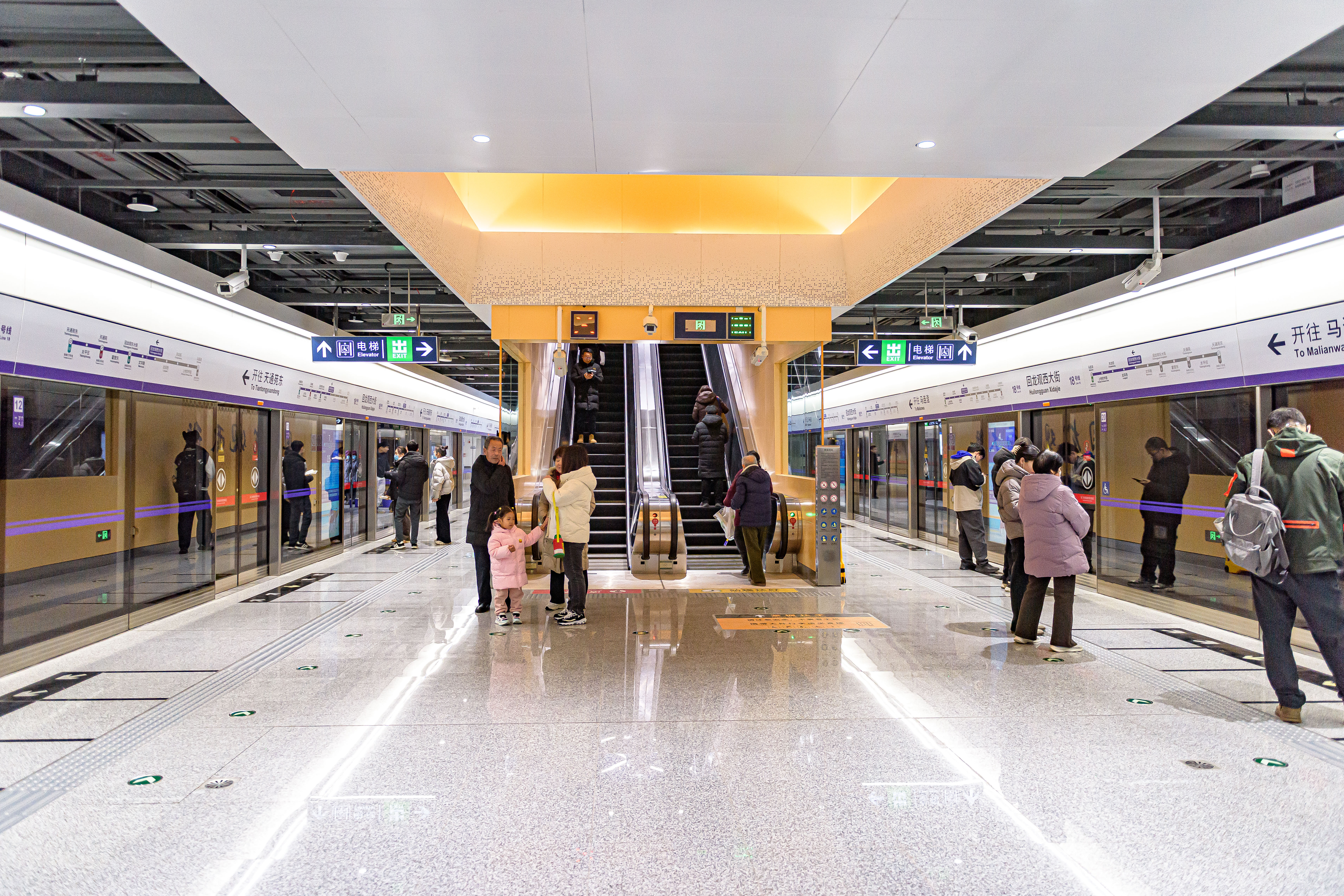
- Platform (December 2025)

Chinese name
- Simplified Chinese: 回龙观西大街站
- Traditional Chinese: 回龍觀西大街站
Transcriptions
Standard Mandarin
- Hanyu Pinyin: Huílóngguàn Xīdàjiē zhàn

General information
- Location: East side of the intersection of Huilongguan West Street (回龙观西大街) and Yuzhi Road (育知路), Longzeyuan Subdistrict; Changping District, Beijing; China
- Coordinates: 40°04′39″N 116°19′32″E
- System: Beijing Subway station
- Operator: Beijing Mass Transit Railway Operation Corporation Limited
- Line: Line 18
- Platforms: 2 (1 island platform)
- Tracks: 2

Construction
- Structure type: Underground
- Accessible: Yes

History
- Opened: December 27, 2025; 7 months ago
- Former names: Huilongguanxi (回龙观西)

Services
Preceding station	Beijing Subway	Following station
Longzexi towards Malianwa	Line 18	Wenhualu towards Tiantongyuandong
Location
- Location within Beijing

Huilongguan Xidajie station (simplified Chinese: 回龙观西大街站; traditional Chinese: 回龍觀西大街站; pinyin: Huílóngguàn Xīdàjiē zhàn; lit. 'Huilongguan West Street station') is a station on Line 18 of the Beijing Subway. It opened on December 27, 2025.

== Location ==
The station is located under the west side of the intersection of Huilongguan West Street and Yuzhi Road in Longzeyuan Subdistrict in Changping District.

== Station features ==
The station has an underground island platform.

=== Exits ===
The station has 4 exits, lettered A1, A2, B, and C. Exit A2 is accessible via an elevator. There is also an unassigned elevator exit.

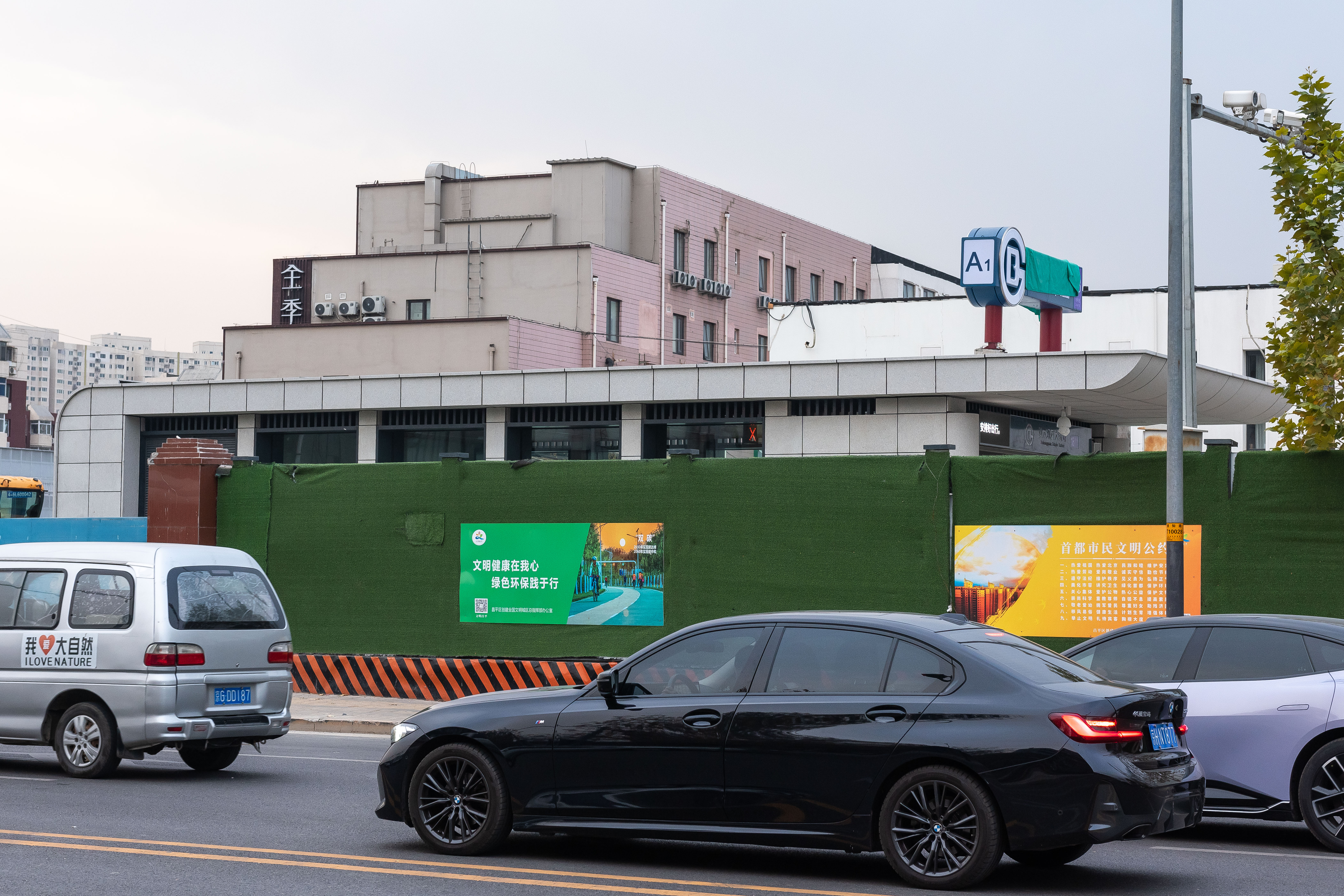
Exit A1

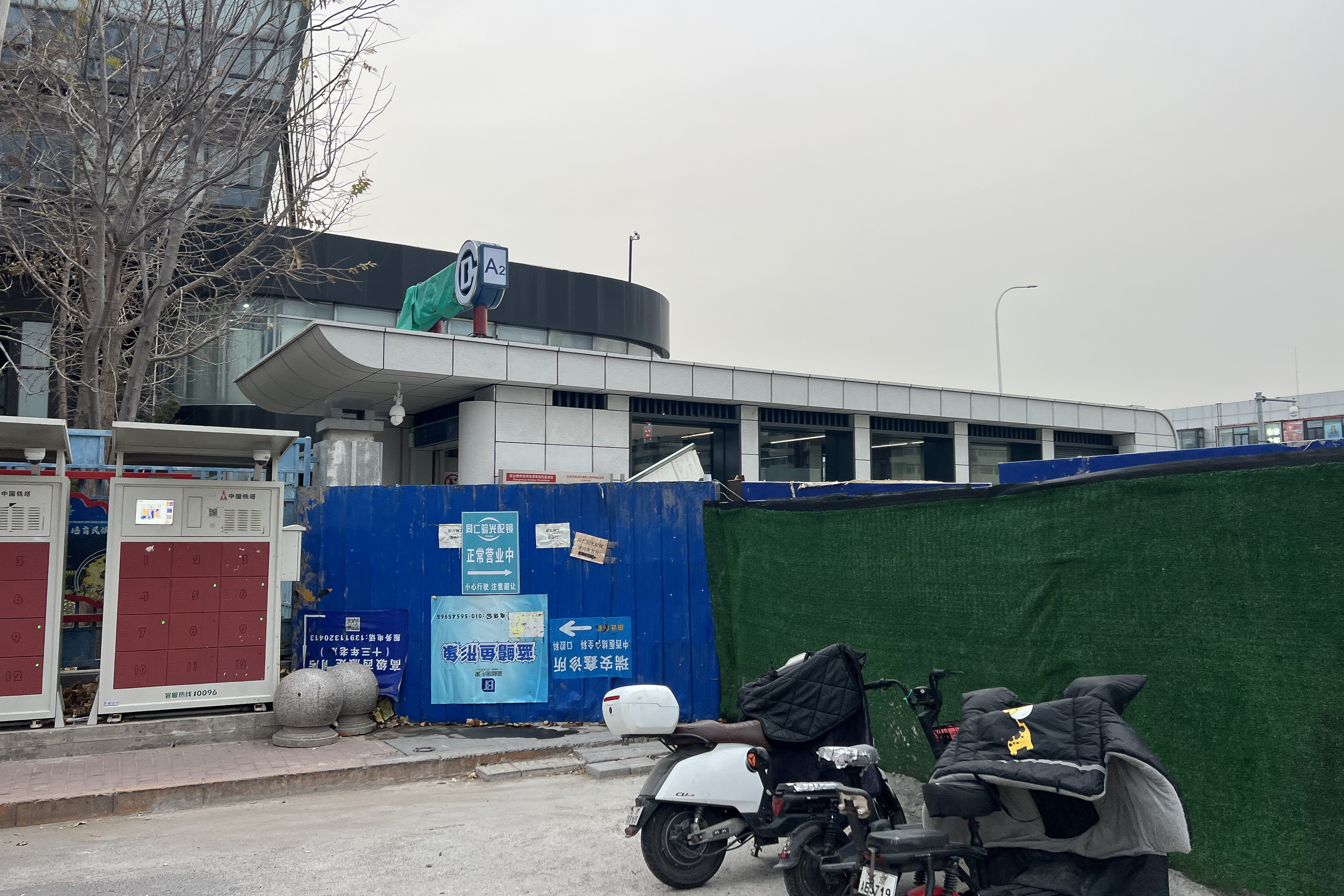
Exit A2

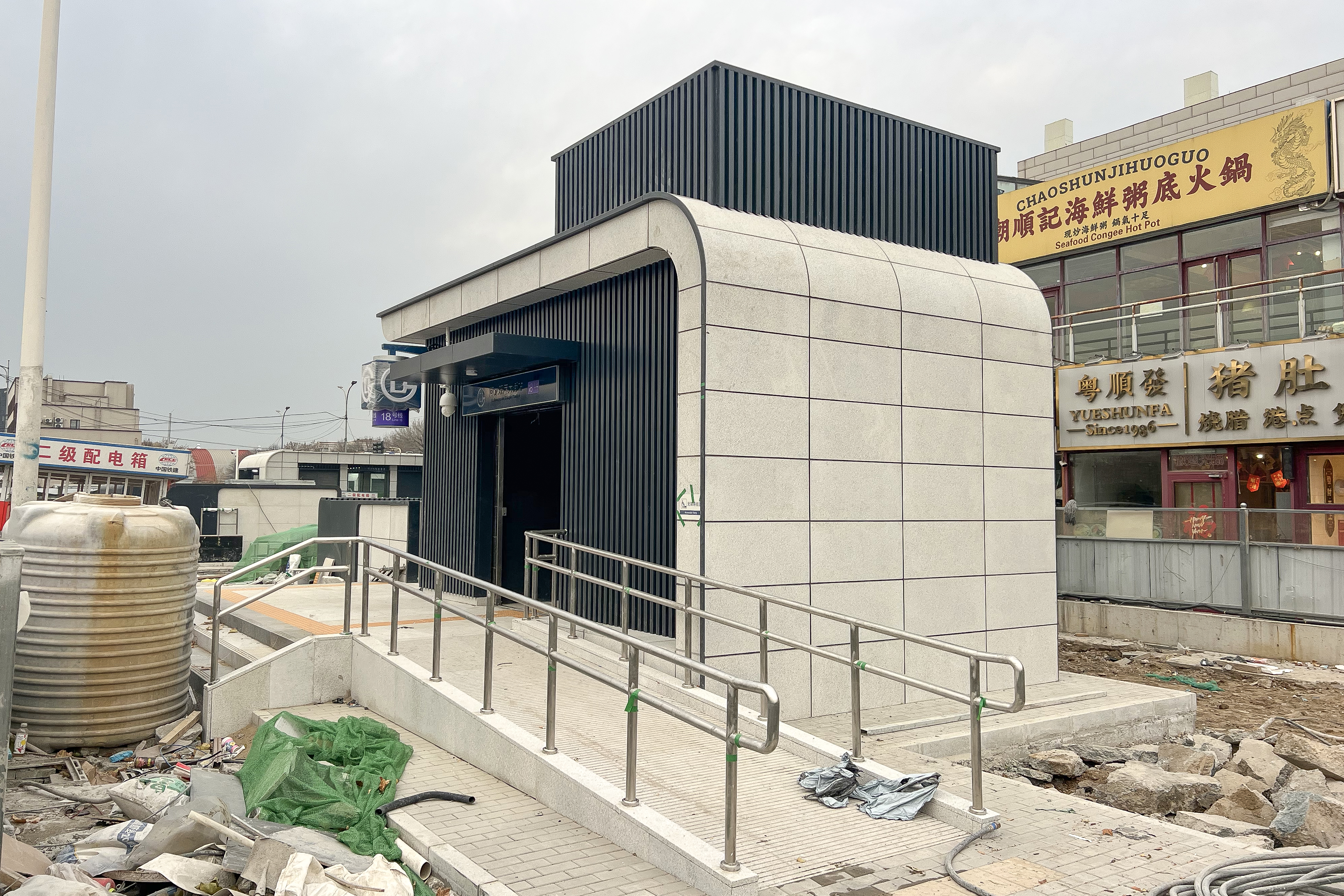
Exit A2 (elevator exit)

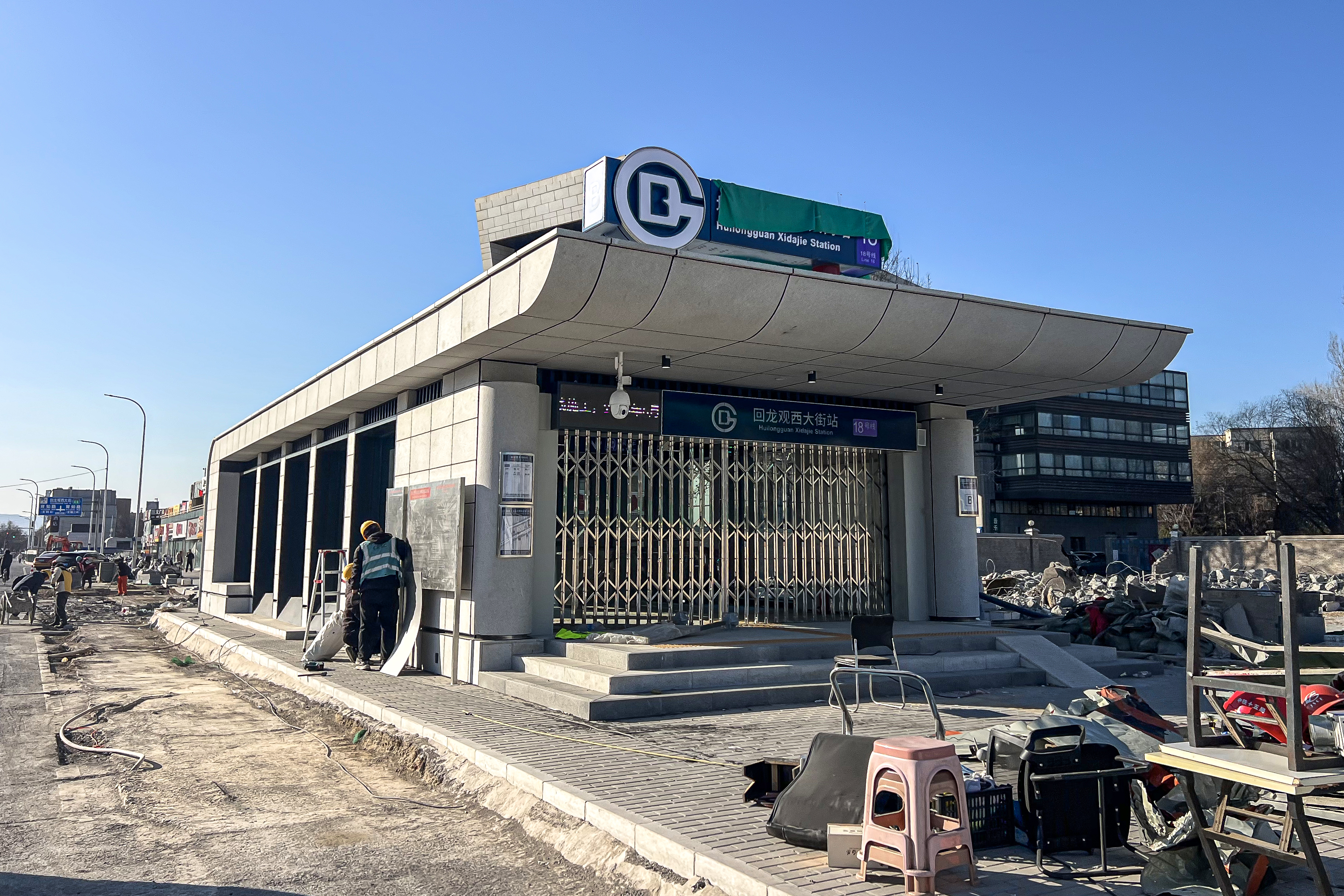
Exit B

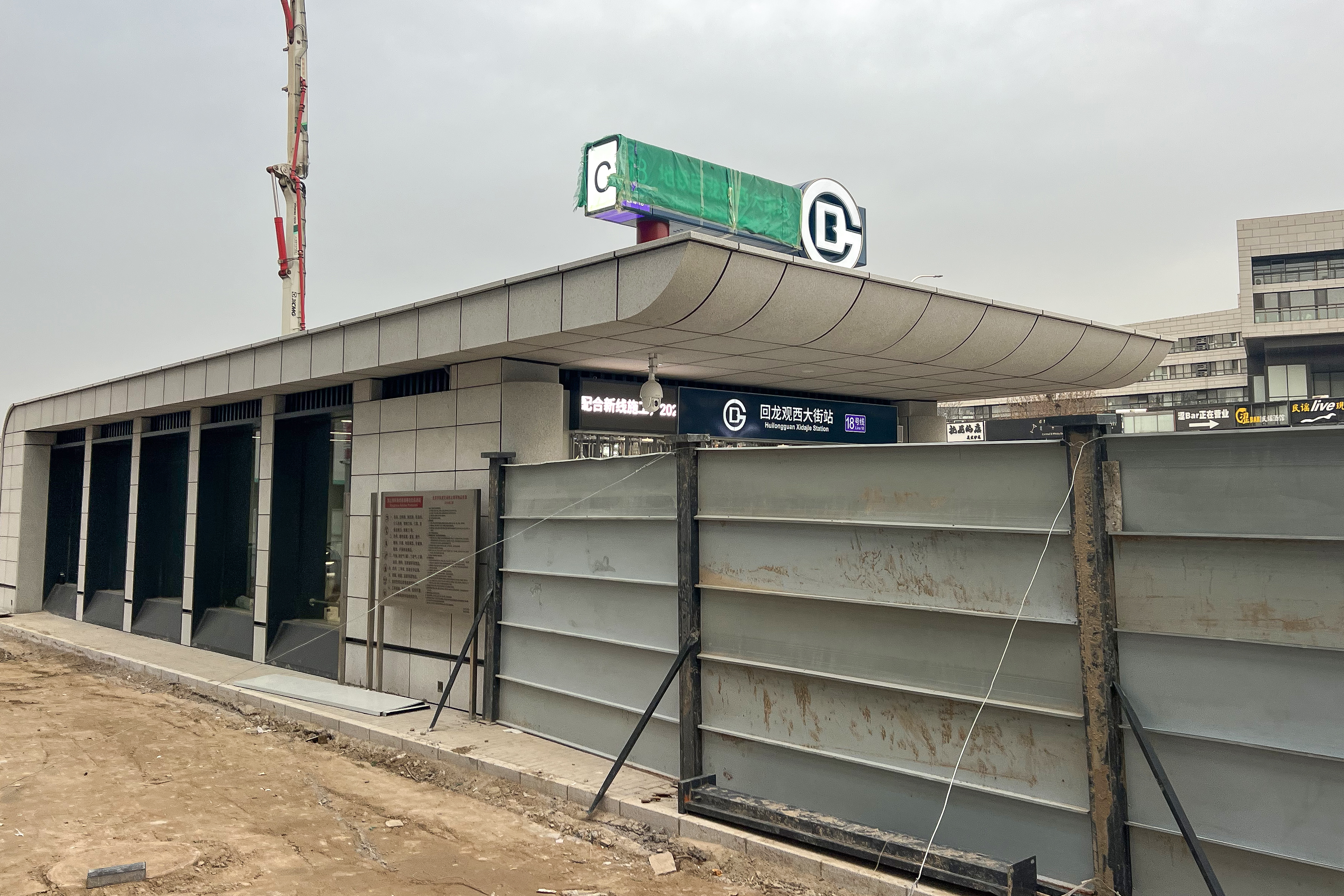
Exit C

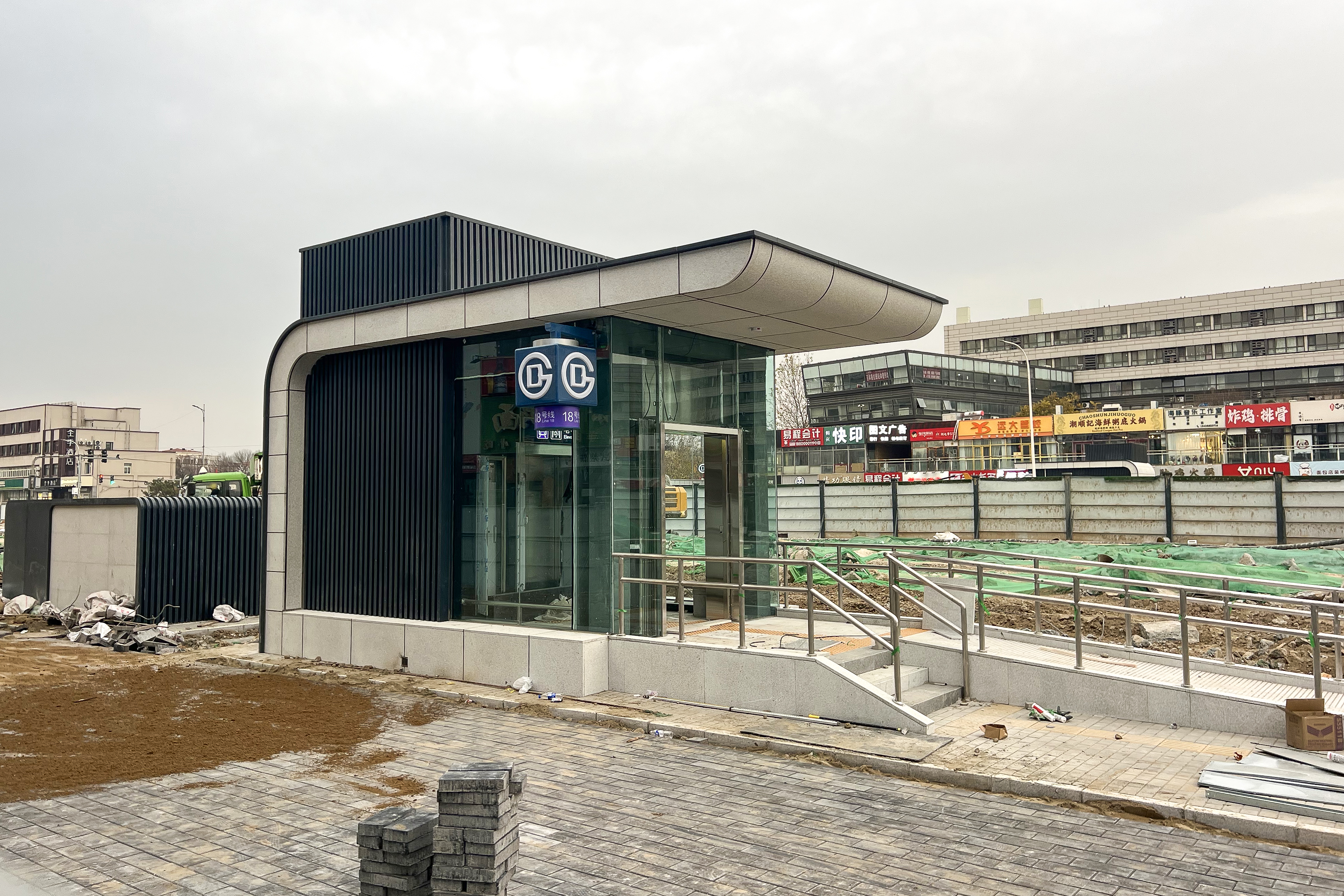
Elevator exit

== History ==
On December 23, 2024, the main structure of the station was topped out.

On March 20, 2025, the Beijing Municipal Commission of Planning and Natural Resources announced the naming plan for the expansion and upgrading project of Line 13, and planned to name the station as Huilongguan Xidajie.
