= Longzexi station =

Beijing Subway Line 18 station

Longzexi 龙泽西
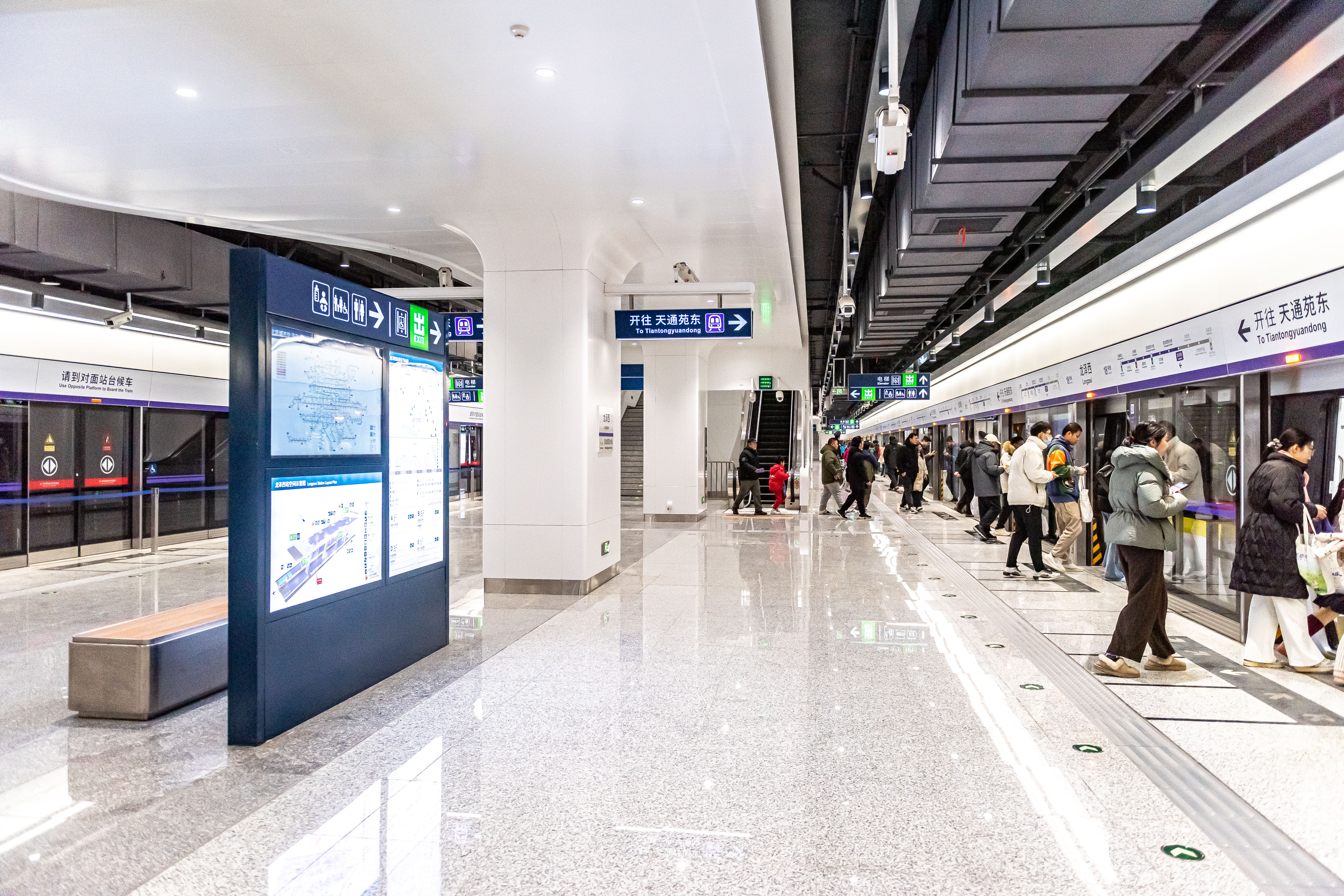
- Eastbound platform

Chinese name
- Simplified Chinese: 龙泽西站
- Traditional Chinese: 龍澤西站
Transcriptions
Standard Mandarin
- Hanyu Pinyin: Lóngzéxī zhàn

General information
- Location: Intersection of Longyu East 1st Road (龙域东一路) and Huichuang Road (回创路), Huilongguan Subdistrict; Changping District, Beijing; China
- Coordinates: 40°04′17″N 116°18′06″E
- System: Beijing Subway station
- Operator: Beijing Mass Transit Railway Operation Corporation Limited
- Line: Line 18
- Platforms: 4 (2 island platforms)
- Tracks: 4

Construction
- Structure type: Underground
- Accessible: Yes

History
- Opened: Line 18: December 27, 2025; 7 months ago; Line 13: December 2027; 1 year's time (expected); Line 19: December 2029; 3 years' time (planned)
- Former names: Longyu (龙域), Xinlongze (新龙泽), Beijiaonongchang Qiao (北郊农场桥)

Services
Preceding station	Beijing Subway	Following station
Dongbeiwang towards Malianwa	Line 18	Huilongguan Xidajie towards Tiantongyuandong
Future services
Xi'erqi towards Chegongzhuang	Line 18 Opening 2027	Huilongguan Xidajie towards Tiantongyuandong
Location
- Location within Beijing

Longzexi station (simplified Chinese: 龙泽西站; traditional Chinese: 龍澤西站; pinyin: Lóngzéxī zhàn) is a station on Line 18 and the new Line 13 of the Beijing Subway. The Line 18 section opened on December 27, 2025, whilst the new Line 13 section is expected to open in December 2027. In the future, it will feature interchanges with Line 19 and BCR Northeast Ring line.

== Location ==
The station is located under the intersection of Longyu East 1st Road and Huichuang Road, in Huilongguan Village, Huilongguan Subdistrict, Changping District.

== Station features ==
=== Lines 13 & 18 ===
The station has two underground island platforms for Line 18 in its initial opening phase (which will combine to create a new Line 13 and re-routed Line 18 in 2027).

=== Line 19 ===
Another underground island platform for Line 19 (North extension) is expected to open in 2029.

== Exits ==
The station has 5 exits. Exits A, B, D and E opened with the station on December 27, 2025. Exit C is still under construction. Exits F and G will open after the Line 19 station opens.

== History ==
The station was previously named as Xinlongze station (Chinese: 新龙泽站; pinyin: Xīnlóngzé zhàn). On November 10, 2022, construction of the first ground wall of the station of the station officially started.

On March 20, 2025, the Beijing Municipal Commission of Planning and Natural Resources announced the naming plan for the expansion and upgrading project of Line 13, and planned to name the station as Longyu station (Chinese: 龙域站; pinyin: Lóngyù zhàn).

In May 2025, the station was included in the 03-contract section of civil construction of the second phase of Line 19 (North Extension and North Extension Branch).

On August 18, 2025, the Beijing Municipal Commission of Planning and Natural Resources announced the station is officially named as Beijiaonongchang Qiao station (Chinese: 北郊农场桥站; pinyin: Běijiāonóngchǎng Qiáo zhàn), named after Beijiao Farm Bridge on Jingzang Expressway.

On December 4, 2025, the Beijing Municipal Commission of Planning and Natural Resources announced the station is renamed as Longzexi station (Chinese: 龙泽西站; pinyin: Lóngzéxī zhàn).
