= Line 18 (Beijing Subway) =

Metro line serving the northern suburbs of Beijing

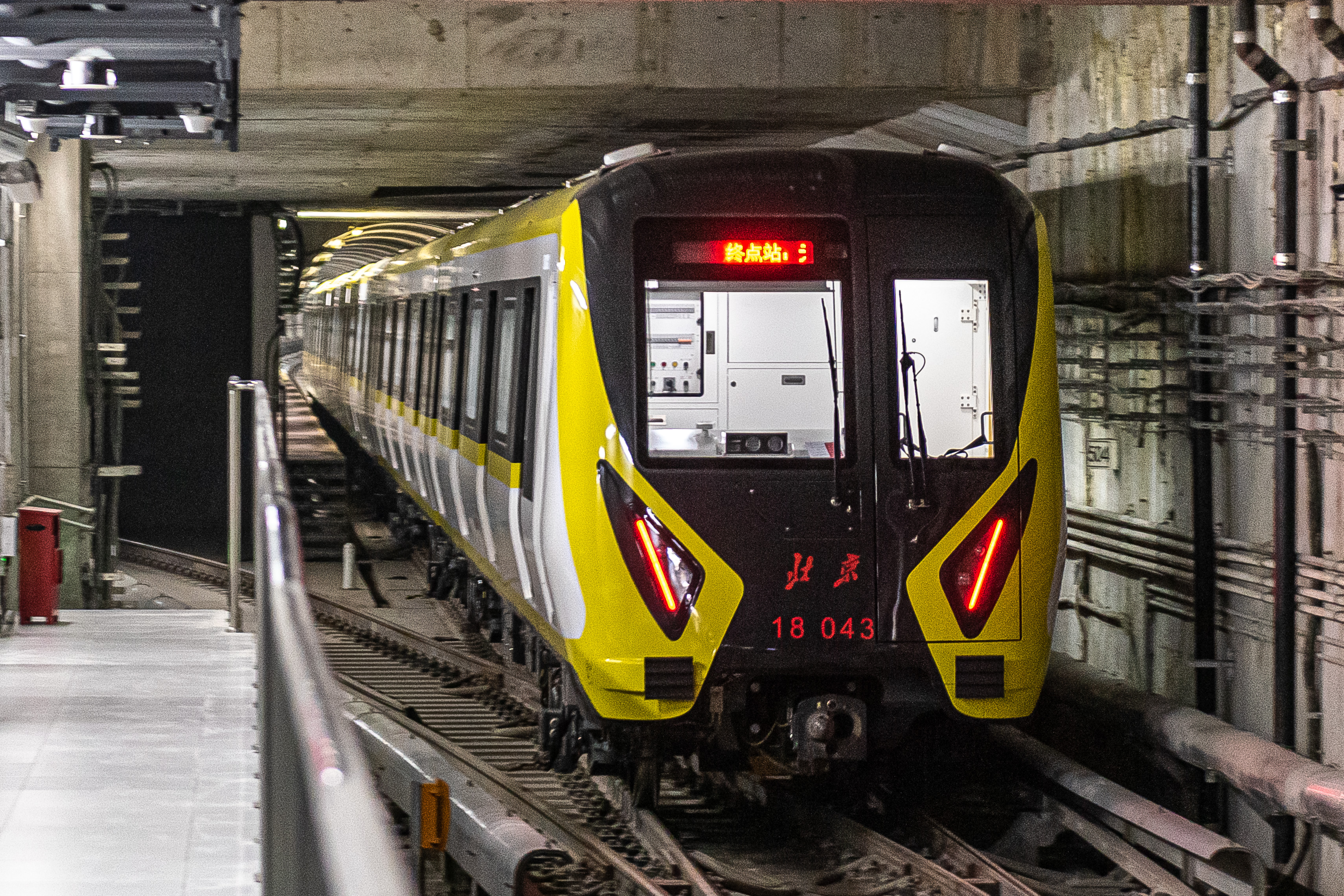
- Line 18 train leaving Malianwa station

Overview
- Status: Operational
- Locale: Haidian and Changping districts Beijing
- Termini: Malianwa; Tiantongyuandong
- Stations: 11

Service
- Type: Rapid transit
- System: Beijing Subway
- Operator: Beijing Mass Transit Railway Operation Corp., Ltd
- Depot: Xiaoxinzhuang Stabling Yard
- Rolling stock: 6-car Quasi-Type B (ZBM15)

History
- Opened: December 27, 2025; 10 months ago

Technical
- Line length: 19.805 km (12.306 mi)
- Character: Underground
- Track gauge: 1,435 mm (4 ft 8 1/2 in)
- Electrification: 750 V DC Third rail
- Operating speed: 80 km/h (50 mph)

Line 18 of the Beijing Subway (Chinese: 北京地铁18号线; pinyin: běijīng dìtiě shíbāhào xiàn), also known as the Line 13-18 temporary through service line, is a metro line that serves the northern suburbs of Beijing, from Malianwa in the west in Haidian District to Tiantongyuandong in the east in Changping District. The line is 19.8 km (12.3 mi) long with 11 stations, and has a stabling yard in Xiaoxinzhuang (小辛庄停车场). It currently does not feature an interchange with Line 13. (Note: Transfers at Longzexi Station will only be possible after the reconstruction of Longze Station is completed and the existing Line 13 is re-routed underground to both the reconstructed Longze Station and Longzexi Station. During the period when Line 18 operates from Malianwa to Tiantongyuandong, the existing Line 13 will still use its original surface track when passing south of Longzexi Station, and will not actually enter the station itself, thus making transfers impossible.) The line was originally planned to open between Dongbeiwang and Tiantongyuandong at the end of 2025, and to open between Shangdi Software Park and Malianwa in 2026, but due to the quick construction progress, the entire section opened on December 27, 2025.

== History ==
=== Construction ===
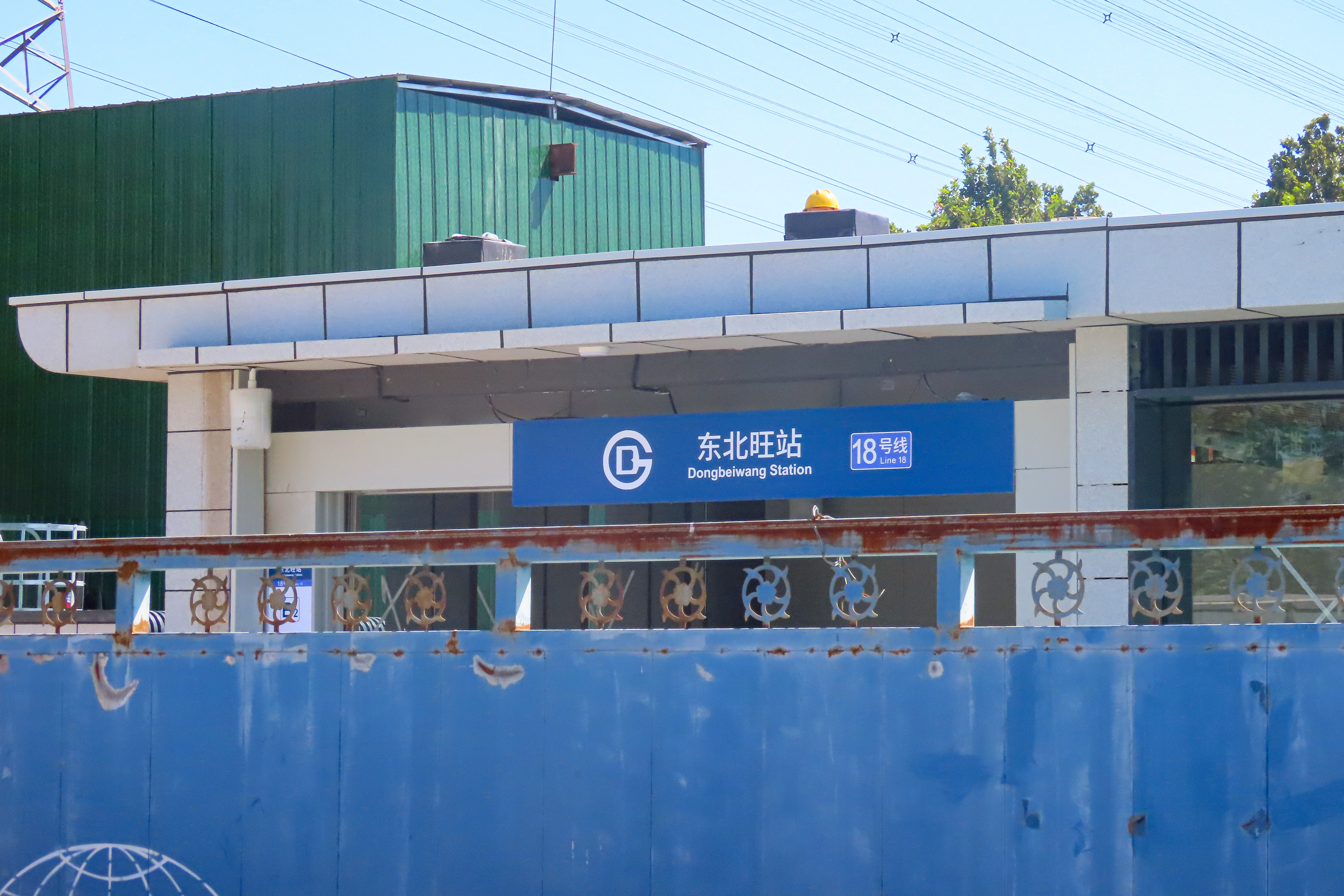
Interim sign of Dongbeiwang station featuring Line 18 markings

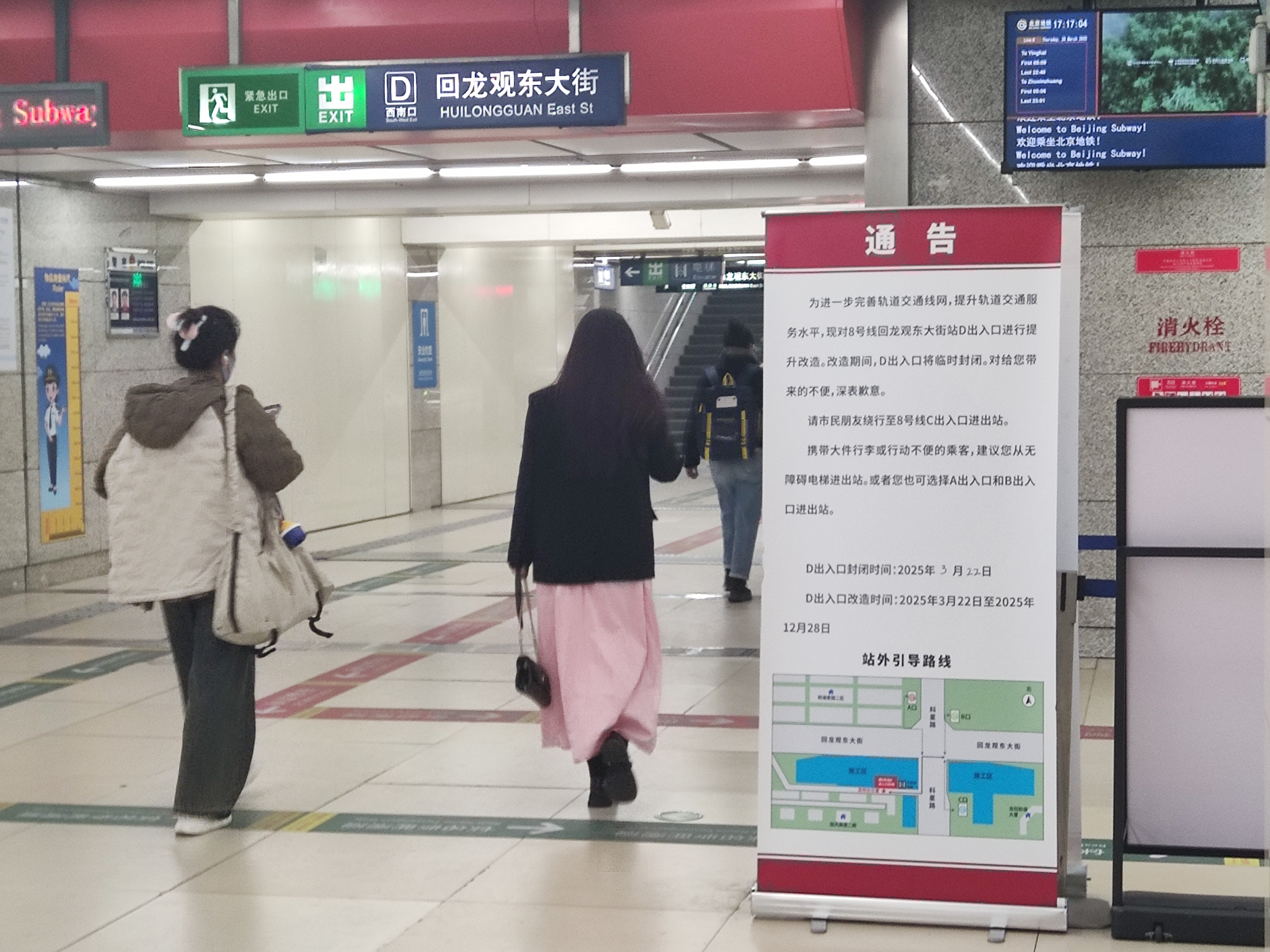
Notice regarding the closure of Exit D of Huilongguan Dongdajie Station on Line 8 (excluding the accessible elevator) from March 22 to December 28, 2025.

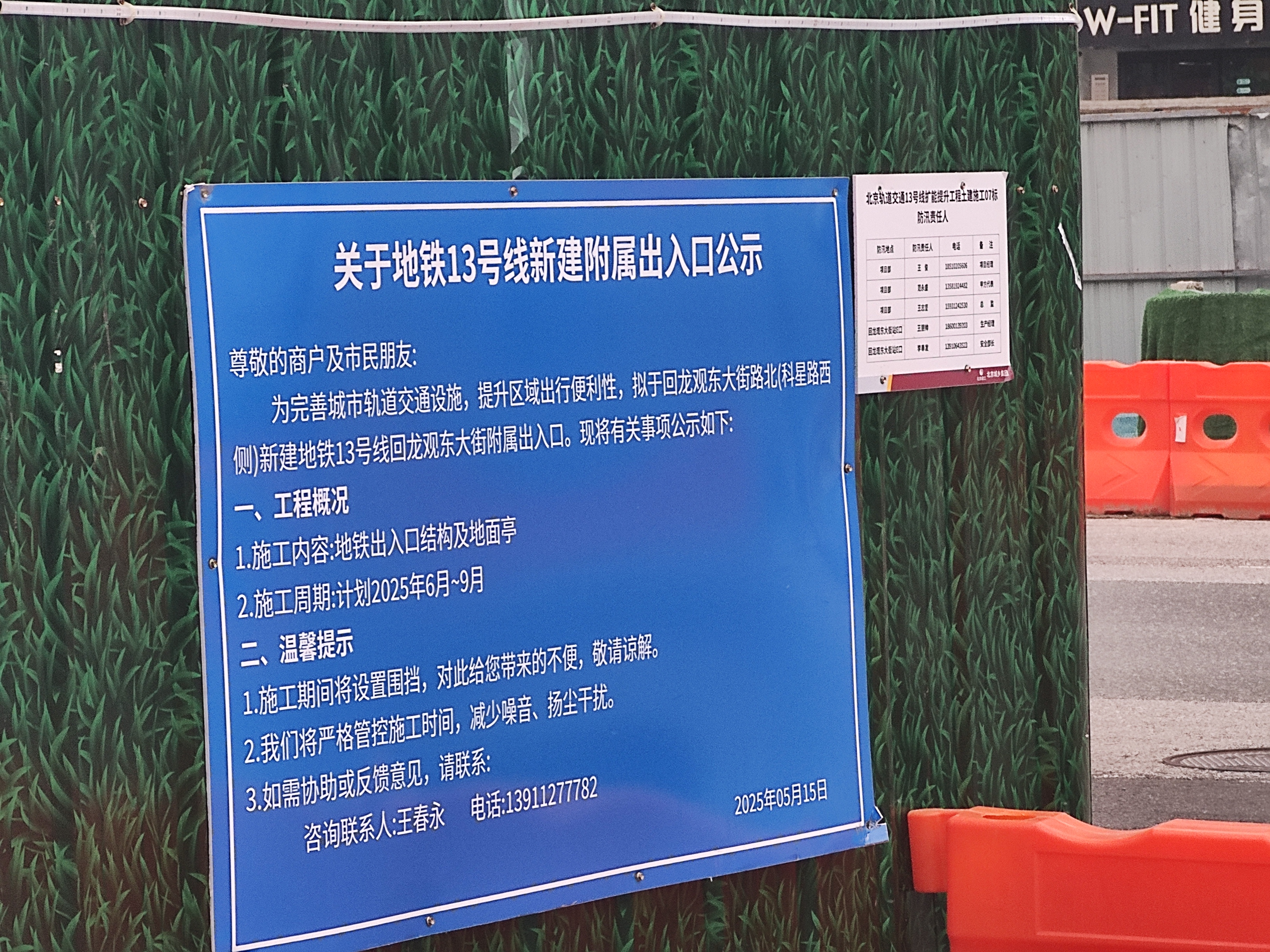
Exit E (formerly Exit A2) of Huilongguan Dongdajie Station on Line 18 is expected to be completed in September 2025.

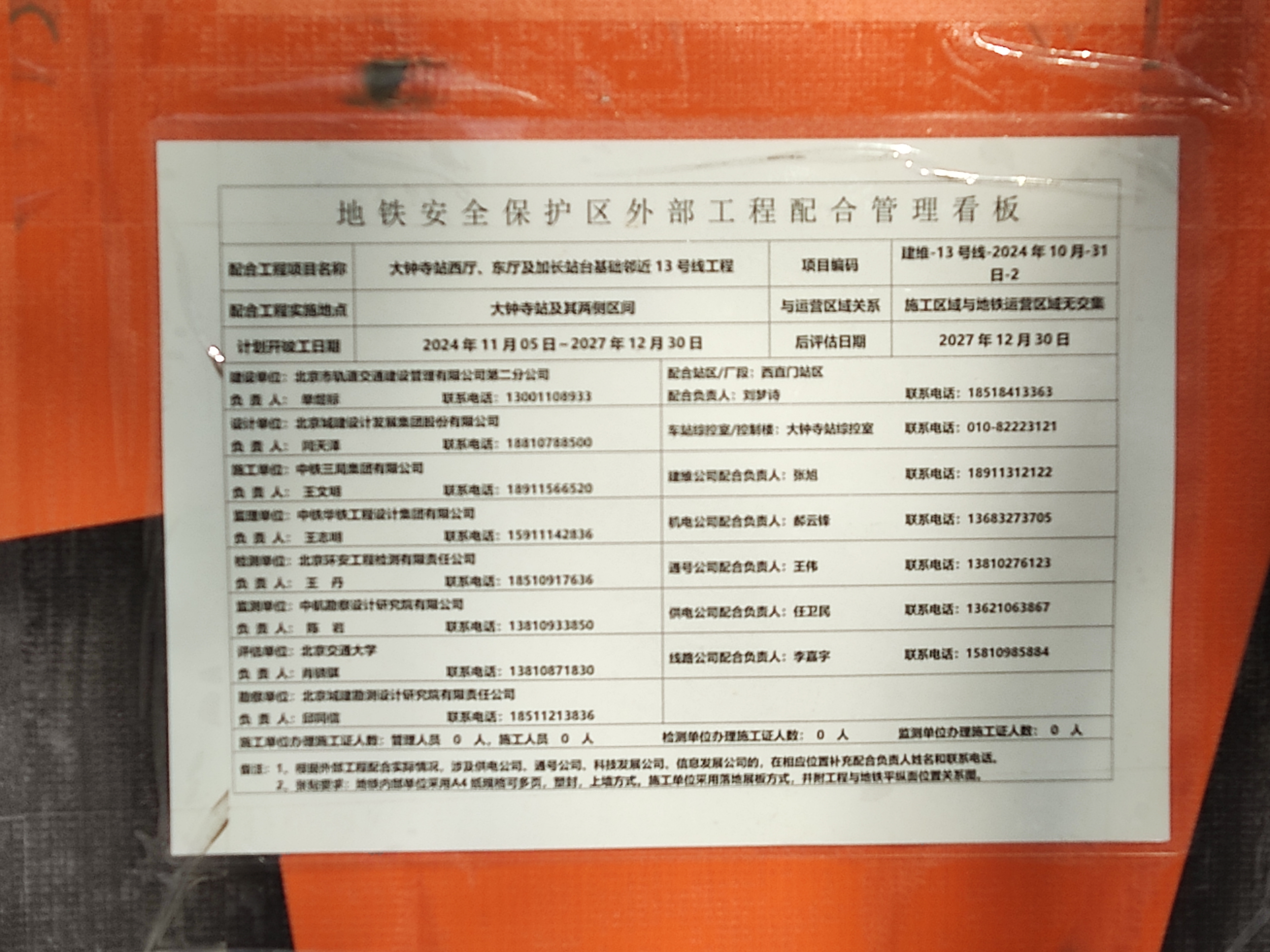
The construction period for the expansion project of the existing Dazhongsi Station on Line 13 to 8 train cars is tentatively scheduled to end in December 2027.

In April 2023, all 11 stations in the northern section of the Beijing Subway Line 13 split project started construction. As of January 2025, most of the stations in the 8-car lengthening project of the existing Line 13 (Xierqi Station to Dazhongsi Station) were still in a state of fencing the construction site, which meant construction had not started substantively or the construction progress was slow, with the tentative construction period expected to last until December 2027. In addition, the construction progress of the underground Longze Station on the east side of the existing Longze Station was also slow, with the current tentative construction period also lasting till the end of 2027. The tunnel entry point south of Dazhong Si Station in the southern extension has not yet made major progress due to the demolition of existing buildings. Due to land acquisition issues, construction of the new Chegongzhuang Station was delayed until April 2024. Affected by the above factors, from December 2025 to December 2027, the new northern section of the Line 13 split project will be operated independently as a new line. The new line was once tentatively called the "Yizi line of Line 13".

In June 2025, CRCC confirmed to use the name Line 13-18 north section through line (13-18北段贯通线). As of July 2025, all stations from Malianwa to Tiantongyuandong have been topped out and all tunnel sections were broken through. In September of the same year, the line confirmed the adoption of the name of Beijing Subway Line 18 and began a no-load trial operation for no less than three months, with plans to open for operation by the end of 2025.

On December 26, 2025, the Beijing Municipal Transportation Commission and the Municipal Major Office confirmed that Line 18 was to open the following day.

=== Initial operation ===
On December 27, 2025, Line 18 officially opened. On December 29 the same year, as the first working day after the opening of Line 18, nearly 20,000 people entered and exited Line 18 during the morning rush hour (7:00-9:00).

=== Opening timeline ===
Segment	Commencement	Length	Station(s)	Name
Malianwa — Tiantongyuandong	27 December 2025	19.8 km (12.3 mi)	11	Initial section

== List of stations ==
List of stations from west to east.

Station Name		Connections	Nearby Bus Stops	Distance km		Location
English	Chinese	Connections	Nearby Bus Stops	Distance km		Location
Malianwa	马连洼	16	305 328 333 362 438 449 476 509 518 575 623 651 932	0.00	0.00	Haidian
Shangdi Software Park	上地软件园		495 专143	2.153	2.153	Haidian
Dongbeiwang	东北旺		333 365 367 446 447 509 902 963 982 快速直达专线46 快速直达专线111 快速直达专线138 通医专线11	1.592	3.745	Haidian
Longzexi	龙泽西		344 345 367 371 407 608 617 618 625 夜38	3.220	6.965	Changping
Huilongguan Xidajie	回龙观西大街		344 367 441 460 519 560 618 快速直达专线203 夜38 专101 专102 专121	1.863	8.828	Changping
Wenhualu	文华路		367 441 460 462 551 557 618 夜38	1.035	9.863	Changping
Huilongguan Dongdajie	回龙观东大街	8	367 441 462 478 558 607 618 636 681 996 C113 快速直达专线203 夜38 专52 专101 专192 专193	1.759	11.622	Changping
Huoyingdong	霍营东		367 441 558 618 636 快速直达专线202 快速直达专线203 夜38 专52	1.134	12.756	Changping
Tiantongyuan	天通苑	5	319 426 430 432 465 520 621 905 966 984 BRT3(快速公交3) 昌27专 快速直达专线60 专20 专58 专104 专119 专133 专136 专137	4.219	16.975	Changping
Taipingzhuang	太平庄		319 428 432 933 快速直达专线168 专48 专104 专119	1.058	18.033	Changping
Tiantongyuandong	天通苑东	17	301 386 432 530 596 628 夜26 专58 专119	1.772	19.805	Changping

== Future development ==
Line 18 (Line 13A)
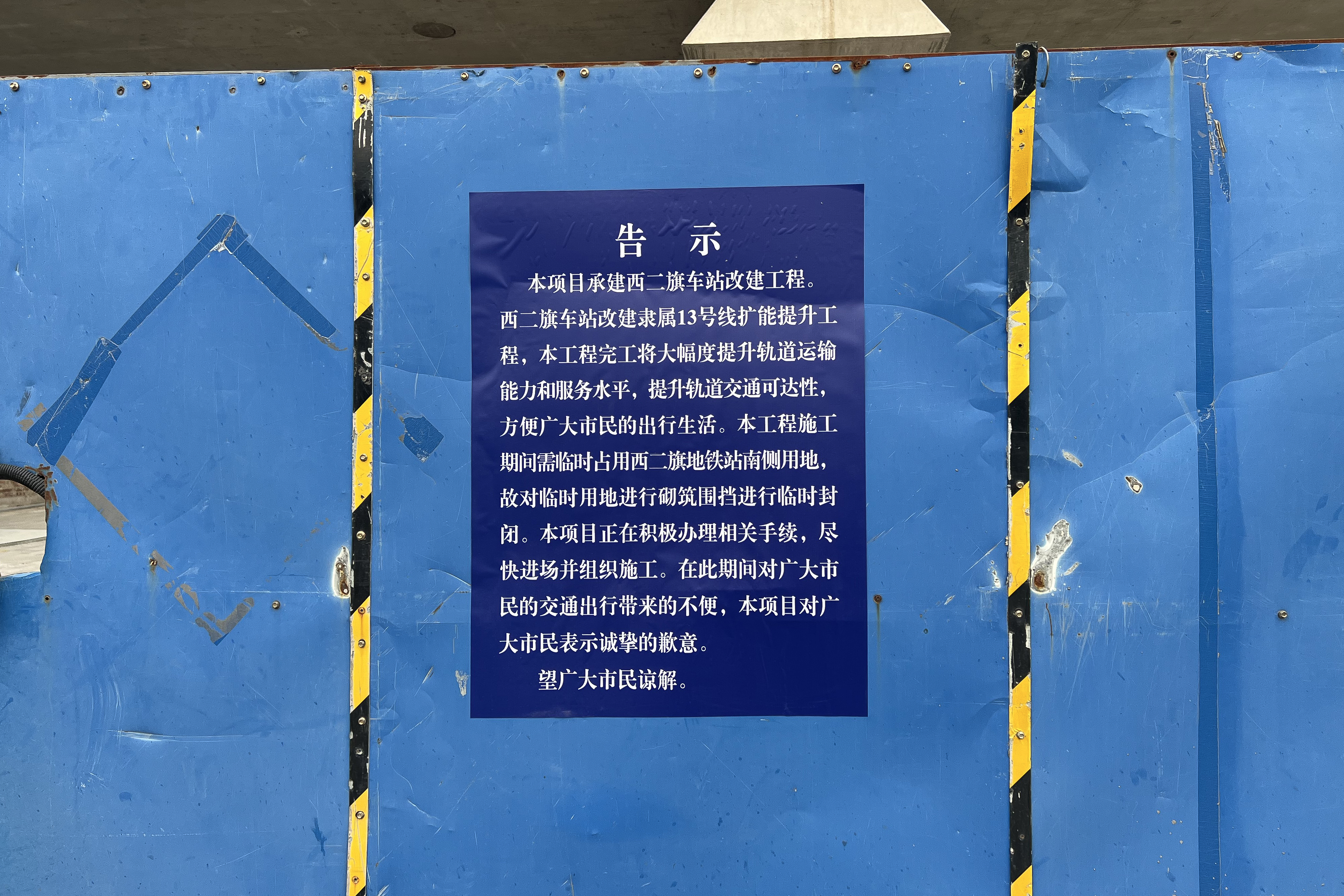
- Notice of platform expansion on the south side of Xi'erqi Station

Overview
- Other name: M13A/M18
- Status: Original section operational, new section under construction
- Locale: Xicheng, Haidian and Changping districts Beijing
- Termini: Chegongzhuang; Tiantongyuandong
- Stations: 19

Service
- Type: Rapid transit
- System: Beijing Subway
- Operator: Beijing Mass Transit Railway Operation Corp., Ltd
- Depot: Xiaoxinzhuang Stabling Yard
- Rolling stock: 8-car Quasi-Type B (ZBM15)

History
- Opened: December 2027; 1 year's time

Technical
- Line length: 31.3 km (19.4 mi)
- Character: Underground
- Track gauge: 1,435 mm (4 ft 8 1/2 in)
- Electrification: 750 V DC Third rail
- Operating speed: 80 km/h (50 mph)

Line 13A will use the Line 18 name after the official completion of the expansion project of Line 13. Stations on Line 13B, together with the stations west of Longzexi on Line 18, will operate under Line 13. However, the actual use of the Line 18 name is unconfirmed.

Below is the tentative route of Line 18 if it operates in the future according to Line 13A:

Legend

- Stations under construction

Station Name		Connections	Distance km	Location
English	Chinese	Connections	Distance km	Location
Chegongzhuang	车公庄	2 6		Xicheng
Xizhimen (Rebuild)	西直门	2 4		Xicheng
Sidao Kou	四道口			Haidian
Dazhong Si	大钟寺	12		Haidian
Zhichun Lu	知春路	10		Haidian
Baofu Si	保福寺			Haidian
Wudao Kou	五道口			Haidian
Qinghua Donglu Xikou	清华东路西口	15		Haidian
Shangdi	上地			Haidian
Qinghe railway station	清河站	Changping; QIP		Haidian
Xi'erqi	西二旗	Changping		Haidian
Longzexi	龙泽西	13		Changping
Huilongguan Xidajie	回龙观西大街			Changping
Wenhualu	文华路			Changping
Huilongguan Dongdajie	回龙观东大街	8		Changping
Huoyingdong	霍营东			Changping
Tiantongyuan	天通苑	5		Changping
Taipingzhuang	太平庄			Changping
Tiantongyuandong	天通苑东	17		Changping

== Rolling stock ==
The line uses 6-car type B rolling stock. In the early stage of operation, ZBM15 EMUs developed by Hebei Railway Company and CCD5091 EMUs will be used with only slight differences in appearance.

=== Current ===
Model	Image	Manufacturer	Year built	Year refurbished	Amount in service	Fleet numbers	Depot
ZBM15		Beijing Subway Rolling Stock Equipment	2023-2024		44	13 001–13 044 (tentatively using 18 instead of 13)	Xiaoxinzhuang
