= Wenhualu station =

Beijing Subway Line 18 station

Wenhualu 文华路
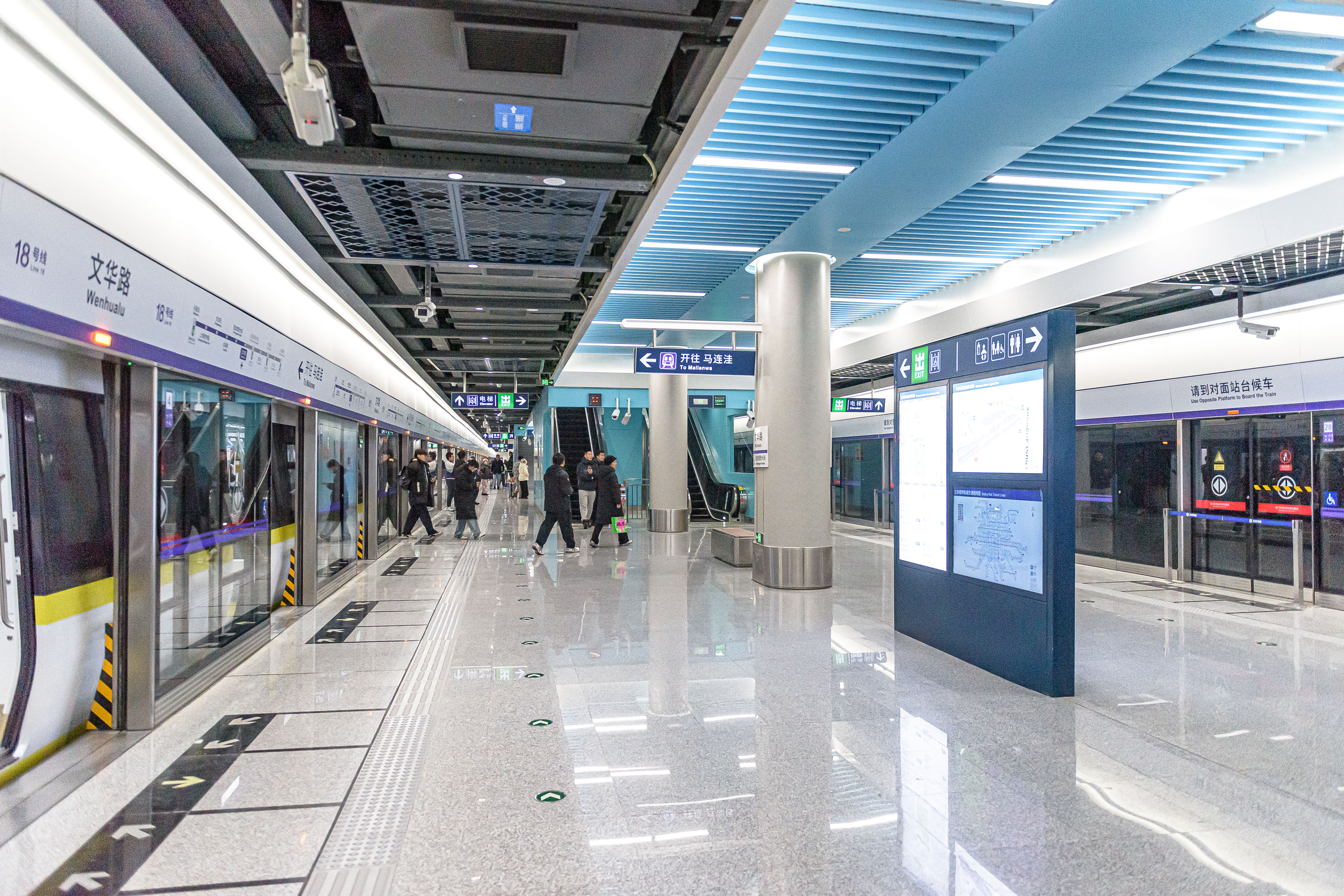
- Westbound platform

Chinese name
- Simplified Chinese: 文华路站
- Traditional Chinese: 文華路站
Transcriptions
Standard Mandarin
- Hanyu Pinyin: Wénhuá Lù zhàn

General information
- Location: West side of the intersection of Huilongguan West Street (回龙观西大街) and Wenhua Road (文华路), Longzeyuan Subdistrict; Changping District, Beijing; China
- Coordinates: 40°04′44″N 116°20′10″E
- System: Beijing Subway station
- Operator: Beijing Mass Transit Railway Operation Corporation Limited
- Line: Line 18
- Platforms: 3 (1 island platform and 1 side platform)
- Tracks: 3

Construction
- Structure type: Underground
- Accessible: Yes

History
- Opened: December 27, 2025; 7 months ago

Services
Preceding station	Beijing Subway	Following station
Huilongguan Xidajie towards Malianwa	Line 18	Huilongguan Dongdajie towards Tiantongyuandong
Location
- Location within Beijing

Wenhualu station (simplified Chinese: 文华路站; traditional Chinese: 文華路站; pinyin: Wénhuá Lù zhàn) is a station on Line 18 of the Beijing Subway. It opened on December 27, 2025.

== Location ==
The station is located under the west side of the intersection of Huilongguan West Street and Wenhua Road in Longzeyuan Subdistrict in Changping District.

== Station features ==
The station has an underground island platform.

=== Exits ===
The station has 4 exits, lettered A, B, C and D. All lead to the west side of the intersection of Huilongguan West Street, Huilongguan East Street and Wenhua Road. In the original plan, Exits B2 and C2 were to be built on the east side of the intersection, but they were subsequently cancelled due to challenging construction conditions. Exits A and C are accessible via elevators.

== History ==
On September 26, 2023, the main structure of the station was topped out.

On March 20, 2025, the Beijing Municipal Commission of Planning and Natural Resources announced the naming plan for the expansion and upgrading project of Line 13, and planned to name the station as Wenhualu.
