= Shangdi Subdistrict =

Shangdi Subdistrict 上地街道
- Subdistrict
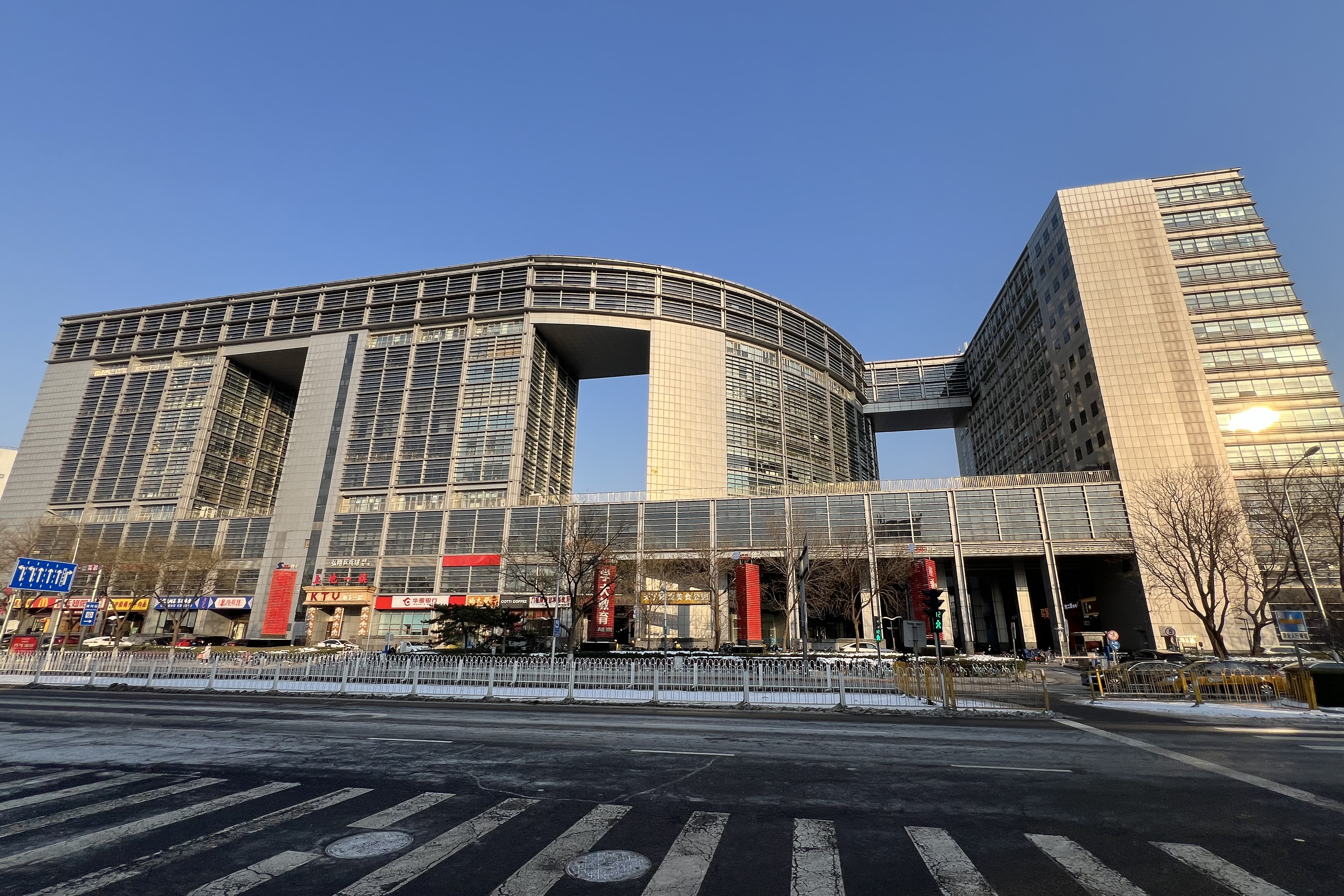
- Keshi Plaza, 2023

- Location within Beijing Location within China
- Coordinates: 40°01′47″N 116°18′25″E
- Country: China
- Municipality: Beijing
- District: Haidian
- Village-level Divisions: 13 communities

Area
  - Total: 9.59 km^{2} (3.70 sq mi)

Population (2020)
  - Total: 67,139
  - Density: 7,000/km^{2} (18,100/sq mi)
- Time zone: UTC+8 (China Standard)
- Postal code: 100193
- Area code: 010

Shangdi Subdistrict (Chinese: 上地街道; pinyin: Shàngdì Jiēdào) is a subdistrict situated in the northeast of Haidian District, Beijing, China. It shares border with Xibeiwang Town in its north, Qinghe Subdistrict in its east, Qinglongqiao Subdistrict in its south, and Malianwa Subdistrict in its west. In the year 2020, its population was 67,139.

The subdistrict was created in 2000. Its name Shangdi (Chinese: 上地; lit. 'Upper Land') is referring to its elevated landscape compared to its surrounding area.

== Administrative Divisions ==
As of 2021, Shangdi Subdistrict administered the following 13 communities within its border:

Administrative division code	Subdivision names	Name transliteration
110108022001	上地东里第一	Shangdi Dongli Diyi
110108022002	上地东里第二	Shangdi Dongli Di'er
110108022003	上地西里	Shangdi Xili
110108022004	东馨园	Dongxinyuan
110108022005	马连洼北路1号院	Malianwa Beilu 1 Haoyuan
110108022008	体大颐清园	Tida Yiqingyuan
110108022010	树村	Shucun
110108022012	紫成嘉园	Zicheng Jiayuan
110108022013	万树园	Wanshuyuan
110108022014	上地科技园	Shangdi Kejiyuan
110108022015	上地南路	Shangdi Nanlu
110108022016	上地八一	Shangdi Bayi
110108022017	博雅西园	Boya Xiyuan

== See also ==
- Shangdi station
- Shangdi Software Park station
- List of township-level divisions of Beijing
