= Malianwa Subdistrict =

Malianwa Subdistrict 马连洼街道
- Subdistrict
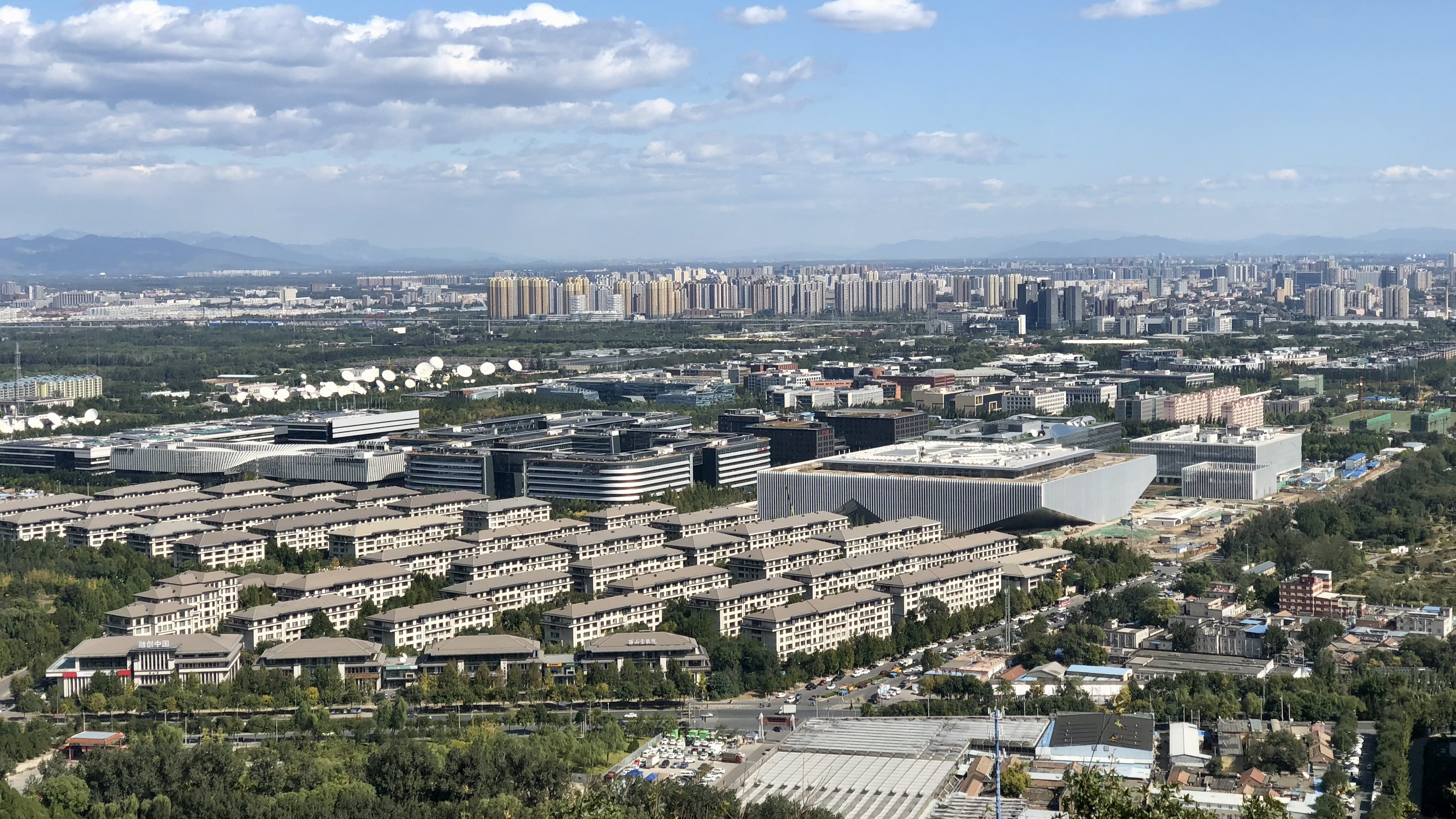
- Zhongguancun Software Park within the subdistrict, 2018

- Location within Beijing Location within China
- Coordinates: 40°01′53″N 116°16′09″E
- Country: China
- Municipality: Beijing
- District: Haidian
- Village-level Divisions: 20 communities

Area
  - Total: 10.57 km^{2} (4.08 sq mi)

Population (2020)
  - Total: 119,022
  - Density: 11,260/km^{2} (29,160/sq mi)
- Time zone: UTC+8 (China Standard)
- Postal code: 100094
- Area code: 010

Malianwa Subdistrict (Chinese: 马连洼街道; pinyin: Mǎliánwā Jiēdào) is a subdistrict situated on northeastern Haidian District, Beijing, China. It shares border with Xibeiwan Town in the north and west, Shangdi Subdistrict in the east, Qinglongqiao Subdistrict in the south, and contains two exclaves of Qinglongqiao Subdistrict. In 2020 its population was 119,022.

Originally this region was known was Malanwa (Chinese: 马兰洼; lit. 'Malan Hollow') for its low-lying landscape and abundance of Kalimeris indica. Over time the name was corrupted to Malianwa.

== History ==
Timetable of Malianwa Subdistrict
Year	Status
1928	Part of suburb of Beijing
1947	Part of the 6th Suburban District
1949	Part of the 16th District
1957	Eastern portion was transferred to Experimental Station of Beijing Agricultural University
1964	Western portion was transferred to Experimental Station of Beijing Agricultural University
1970	Part of Dongbeiwan People's Commune
1983	Part of Dongbeiwan Township
2000	Designated as Malianwa Subdistrict
2005	Incorporated Baicaoyuan Community and Baiwang Xincheng Area from Xibeiwan Town

== Administrative Divisions ==
As of 2021, Malianwa Subdistrict administered 20 communities within its border:

Administrative division code	Subdivision names	Name transliteration
110108020001	梅园	Meiyuan
110108020002	菊园	Juyuan
110108020003	竹园	Zhuyuan
110108020005	天秀花园	Tianxiu Huayuan
110108020006	兰园	Lanyuan
110108020007	水利总队	Shuili Zongdui
110108020009	百草园	Baicaoyuan
110108020011	农业大学	Nongye Daxue
110108020012	农科	Nongke
110108020013	63919部队	63919 Budui
110108020014	肖家河	Xiaojiahe
110108020015	百旺家苑	Baiwang Jiayaun
110108020016	天秀古月园	Tianxiu Guyueyuan
110108020017	农大南路	Nongda Nanlu
110108020018	西北旺	Xibeiwang
110108020019	百旺茉莉园	Baiwnang Moliyuan
110108020020	倚山庭苑	Yishan Tingyuan
110108020021	如缘居	Ruyuanju
110108020022	芳怡园	Fangyiyuan
110108020023	正黄旗北大	Zhenghuangqi Beida

== See also ==
- List of township-level divisions of Beijing
