= Qinglongqiao Subdistrict =

Subdistrict in Haidian, Beijing, China

Qinglongqiao Subdistrict 青龙桥街道
- Subdistrict
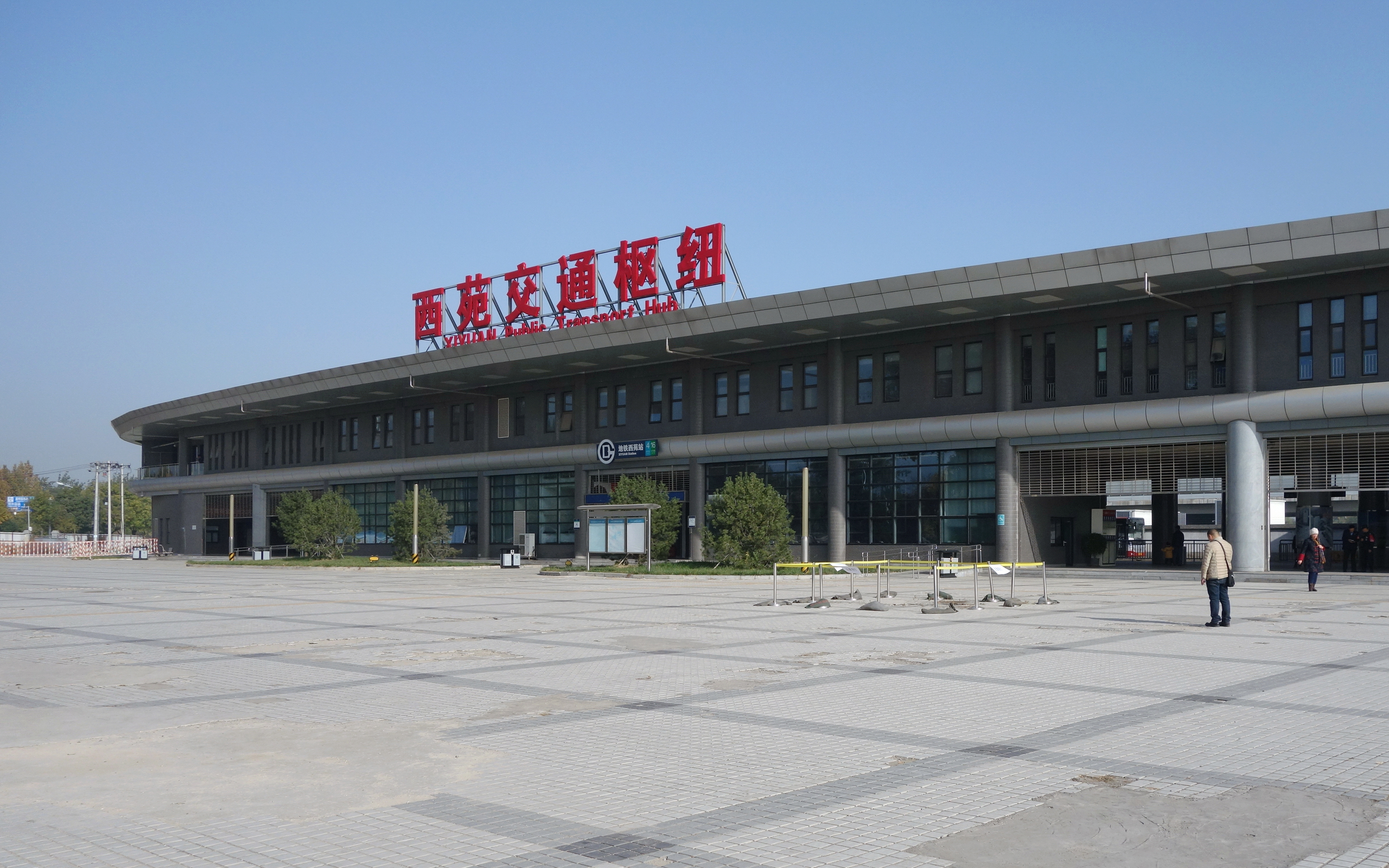
- Xiyuan Public Transport Hub, 2017

- Location within Beijing Location within China
- Coordinates: 40°00′11″N 116°15′55″E
- Country: China
- Municipality: Beijing
- District: Haidian
- Village-level Divisions: 20 communities

Area
  - Total: 18.63 km^{2} (7.19 sq mi)
- Elevation: 56 m (184 ft)

Population (2020)
  - Total: 84,221
  - Density: 4,521/km^{2} (11,710/sq mi)
- Time zone: UTC+8 (China Standard)
- Postal code: 100091
- Area code: 010

Qinglongqiao Subdistrict (simplified Chinese: 青龙桥街道; traditional Chinese: 青龍橋街道; pinyin: Qīnglóngqiáo Jiēdào), is a subdistrict of Haidian District, Beijing. Summer Palace is located in this subdistrict. The subdistrict shares border with Malianwa and Shangdi Subdistricts in the north, Dongsheng Town and Qinghuayuan Subdistrict in the east, Wanliu Area and Sijiqing Town to the south, Xiangshan Subdistrict and Xibeiwang Town to the west. As of 2020, it had 84,221 people residing inside of its border.

The subdistrict was created in 1963. It was named after the Qinglongqiao (Chinese: 青龙桥; lit. 'Azure Dragon Bridge'), which was first built upon an artificial lake during the Yuan dynasty.

== Administrative Divisions ==
In the year 2021, the subdistrict consisted of 20 residential communities:

Administrative division code	Subdivision names	Name transliteration
110108013002	骚子营	Saoziying
110108013004	大有庄	Dayouzhuang
110108013005	福缘门	Fuyuanmen
110108013006	圆明园东里	Yuanmingyuan Dongli
110108013012	颐东苑	Yidongyuan
110108013013	遗光寺	Yiguangsi
110108013014	国防大学	Guofang Daxue
110108013015	韩家川大院	Hanjiachuan Dayuan
110108013016	国际关系学院	Guoji Guanxi Xueyuan
110108013017	中央党校	Zhongyang Dangxiao
110108013018	林业科学研究院	Linye Kexue Yanjiuyuan
110108013019	军事科学院	Junshi Kexueyuan
110108013020	309医院	309 Yiyuan
110108013021	中国中医科学院西苑医院	Zhongguo Zhongyi Kexueyuan Xiyuan Yiyuan
110108013022	颐和园	Yiheyuan
110108013023	中信所西苑小区	Zhongxinsuo Xiyuan Xiaoqu
110108013024	030院	030 Yuan
110108013027	厢红旗安河桥	Xianghongqi Anheqiao
110108013028	水磨成府	Shuimo Chengfu
110108013029	西苑挂甲屯	Xiyuan Guajiatun

== Gallery ==
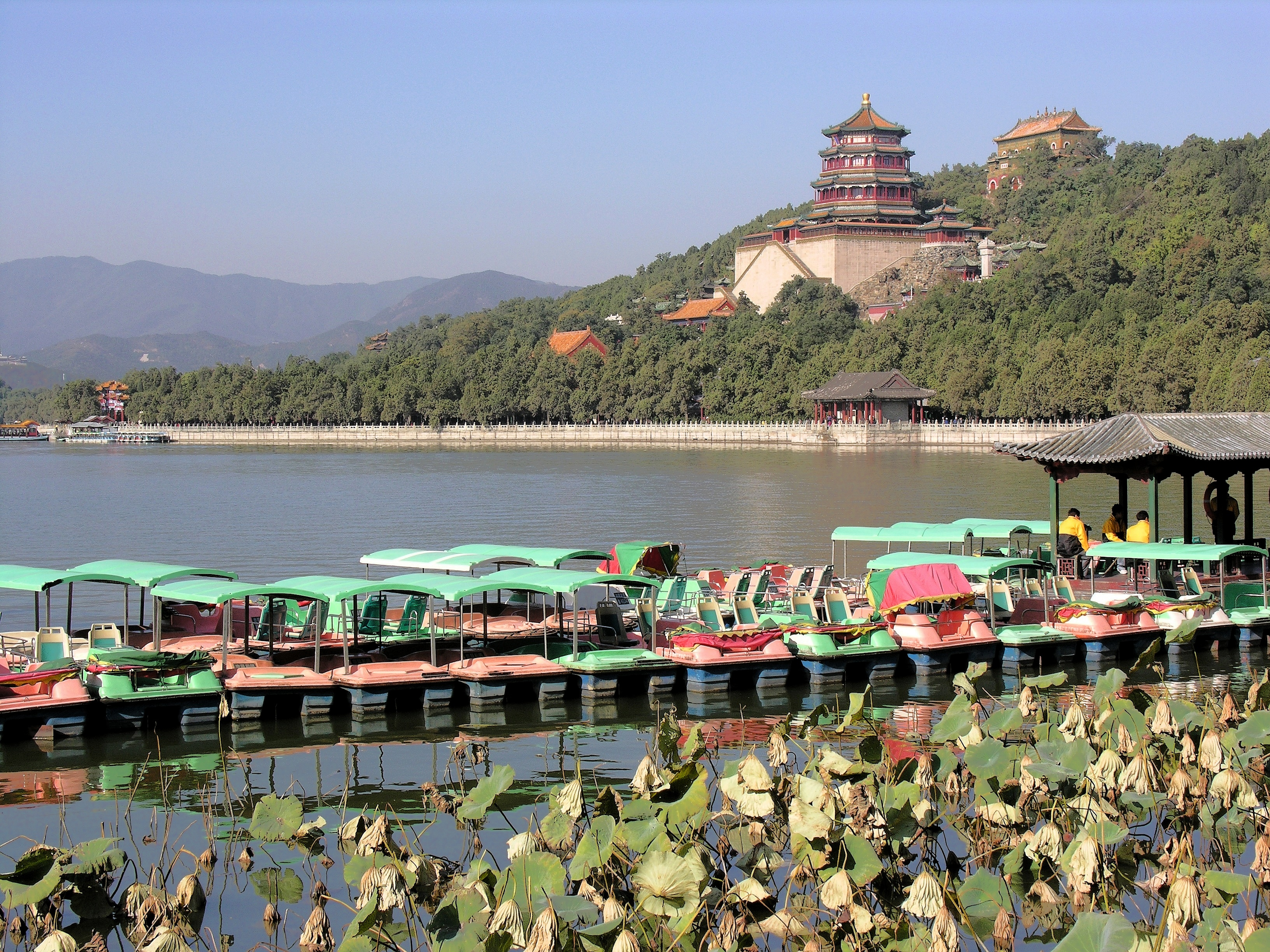
Summer Palace, 2007

== See also ==
- List of township-level divisions of Beijing
