= Huilongguan =

Residential area in Beijing, China

Coordinates: 40°04′N 116°18′E

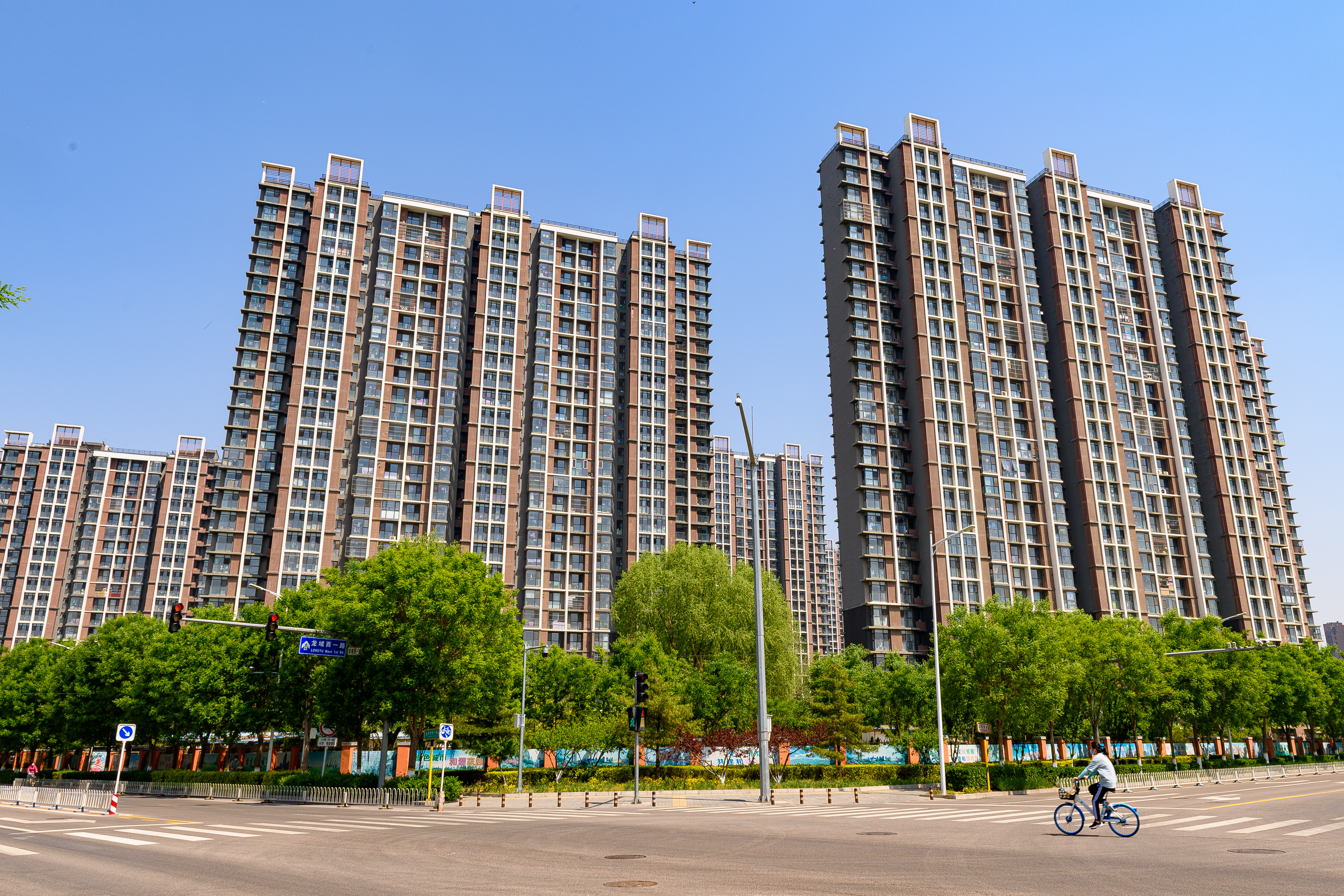
Huilongguan in 2022.

Huilongguan (回龙观) is a residential area in Changping District, northern Beijing. Originally, a satellite town, Huilongguan has grown to become part of the extended Beijing metropolis inside the 6th Ring Road. As of 2025, the area is under the administration of Longzeyuan, Huilongguan, Huoying and Shigezhuang Subdistricts of Changping District, Beijing.

== History ==
During the Ming Dynasty, Emperor Hongzhi established a Taoist temple in what is now Huilongguan. This temple, named Xuanfu Palace, began construction in 1504 and was completed 12 years later, under the Zhengde Emperor. The temple later came to be known as Huilongguan.

After its completion, the temple was often used by the Ming emperors as a stopping place between the Forbidden City and the Ming tombs at Tianshou Mountain. This may explain why the temple was also known as Huilongguan (Returning Dragon View). Alternatively, the name could have come from a nearby Taoist temple named Huilong, which would have been visible from Xuanfu Palace.

== Transport ==
Huilongguan is accessible by the Beijing Subway via Line 8 and Line 13. Line 13 makes three stops along the southern edge of Huilongguan, at Longze, Huilongguan and Huoying. Line 8 has stops at Yuzhi Lu, Pingxifu, Huilongguan Dongdajie, and Huoying.

Huilongguan is also traversed by several public buses, some running from the many apartment complexes in the area to the subway stations and others from the suburb into the city.

== See also ==
- Longzeyuan Subdistrict
- Huilongguan Subdistrict
- Huoying Subdistrict
- Shigezhuang Subdistrict
