= Huilongguan Dongdajie station =

Beijing Subway Line 8 and Line 18 station

Huilongguan Dongdajie 回龙观东大街
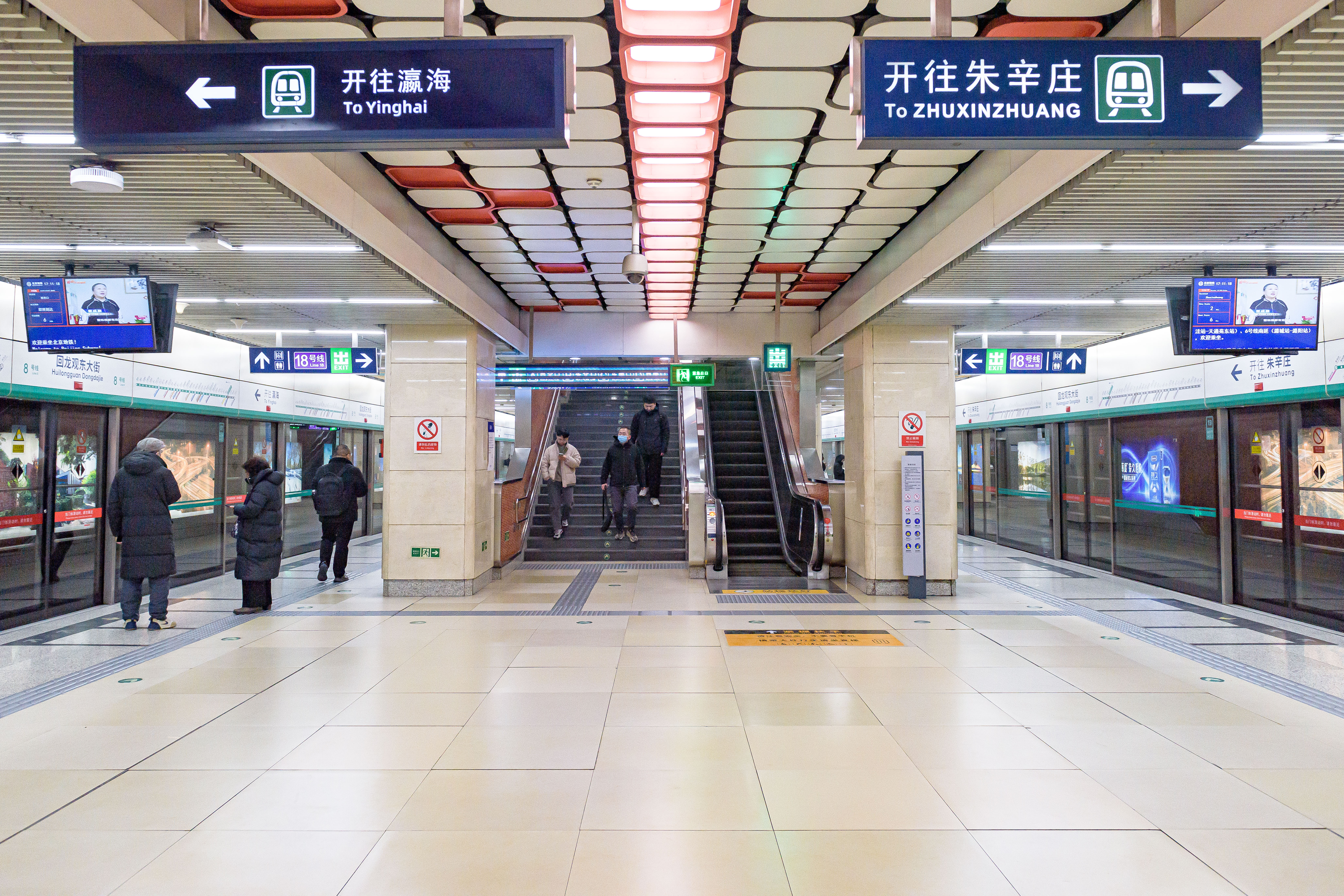
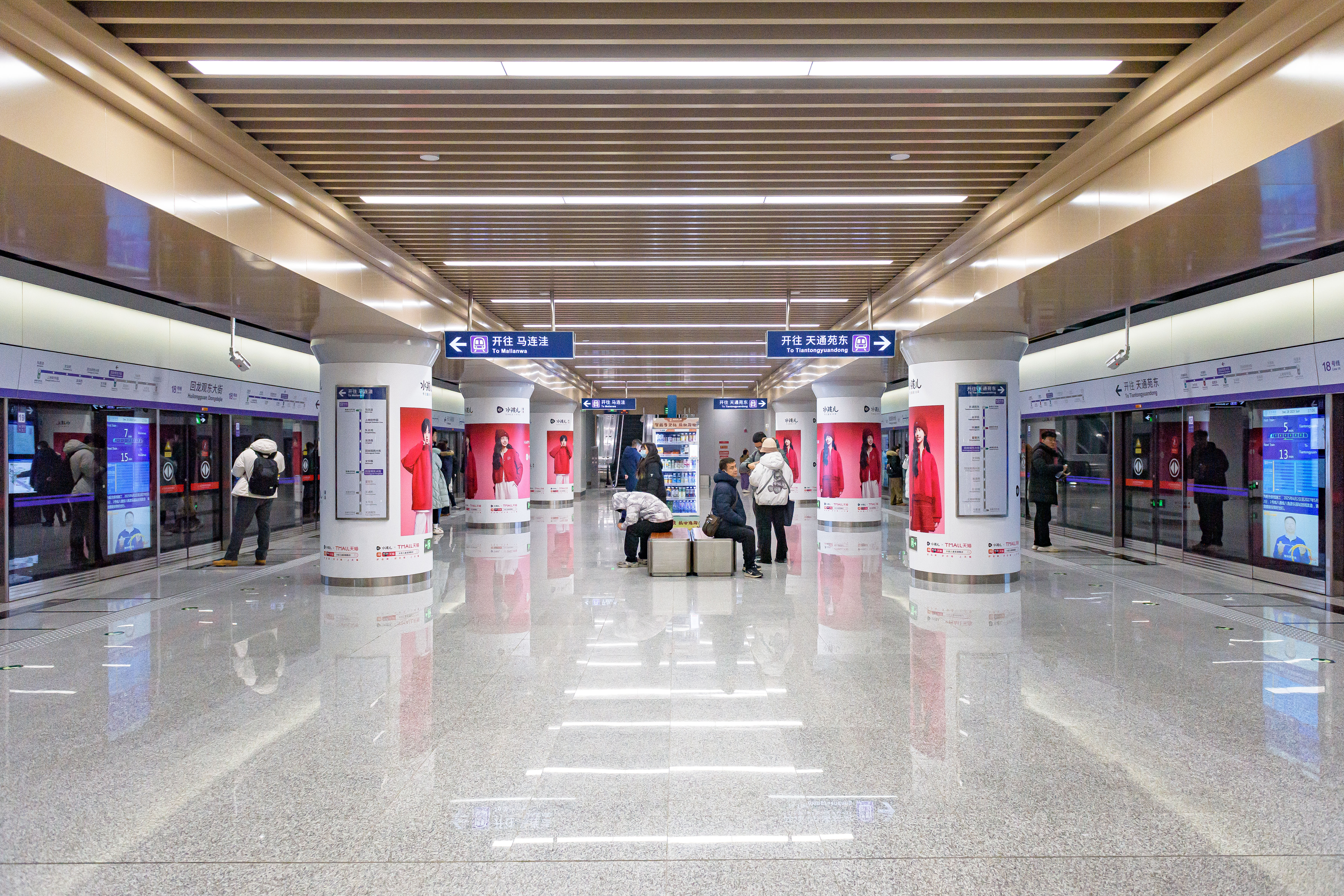
- Line 8 platform Line 18 platform

General information
- Location: Huilongguan East Street (回龙观东大街) and Kexing Road (科星路); Border of Huoying Subdistrict & Longzeyuan Subdistrict, Changping District, Beijing; China
- Coordinates: 40°04′52″N 116°21′47″E
- Operator: Beijing Mass Transit Railway Operation Corporation Limited
- Lines: Line 8; Line 18
- Platforms: 4 (2 island platforms)
- Tracks: 4

Construction
- Structure type: Underground
- Accessible: Yes

History
- Opened: Line 8: December 31, 2011; 14 years ago; Line 18: December 27, 2025; 7 months ago

Services
| Preceding station | Beijing Subway | Following station |
|---|---|---|
| Pingxifu towards Zhuxinzhuang | Line 8 | Huoying towards Yinghai |
| Wenhualu towards Malianwa | Line 18 | Huoyingdong towards Tiantongyuandong |
Location
- Location within Beijing

Huilongguan Dongdajie station (simplified Chinese: 回龙观东大街站; traditional Chinese: 回龍觀東大街站; pinyin: Huílóngguàn Dōngdàjiē zhàn; lit. 'Huilongguan East Street') is an interchange station between Line 8 and Line 18 of the Beijing Subway. It is located at the border of Huoying and Longzeyuan Subdistricts, Changping District, Beijing.

The Line 8 station was opened on December 31, 2011, as part of the extension of Line 8 to the north from Forest Park South Gate station to Huilongguan Dongdajie station. It was the northern terminus of the line until December 28, 2013, when the line was extended further north to Zhuxinzhuang station.

Line 18 opened at this station on December 27, 2025.

== Station layout ==
The station has underground island platforms for both Line 8 and Line 18.

== Exits ==
There are 6 exits, lettered A, B, C, D, E and F. Exit F is accessible via an elevator.
