= Huoying station =

Beijing Subway interchange station

Huoying 霍营
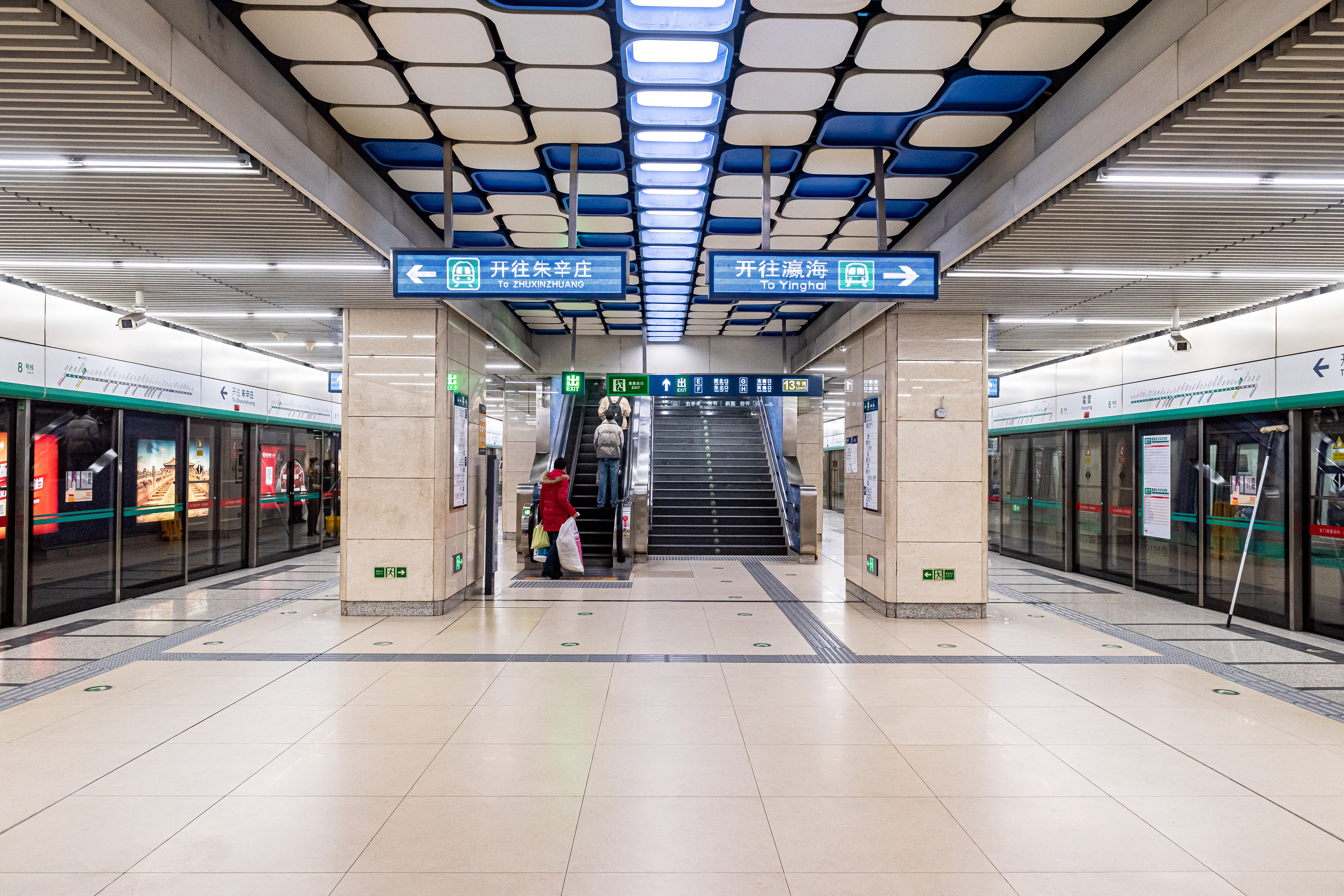
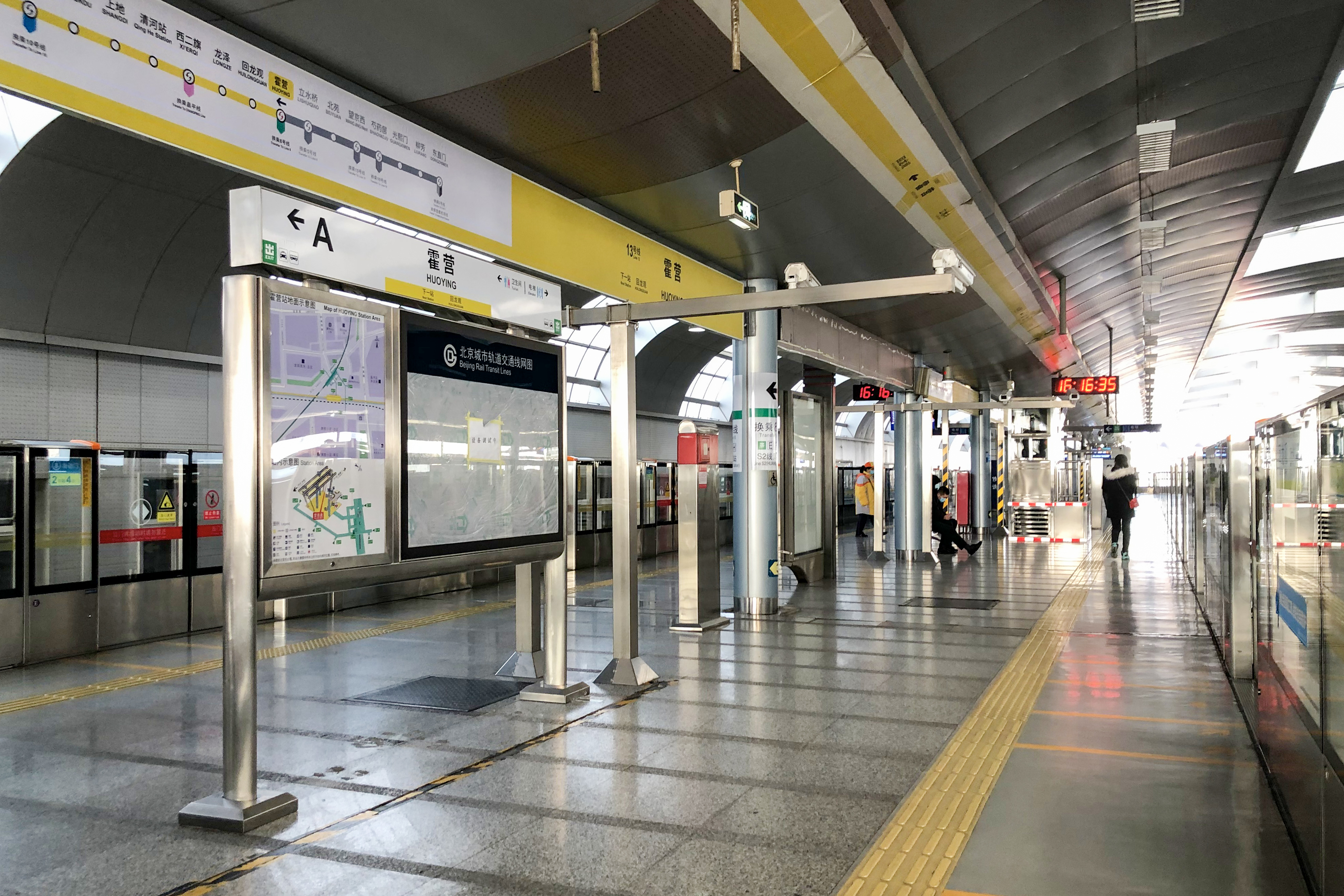
- Line 8 platform Line 13 westbound platform

General information
- Location: Huangping Road (黄平路) and Kexing West Road (科星西路); Border of Huoying Subdistrict and Huilongguan Subdistrict, Changping District, Beijing; China
- Coordinates: 40°04′14″N 116°21′37″E
- Operator: Beijing Mass Transit Railway Operation Corporation Limited
- Lines: Line 8; Line 13
- Platforms: 6 (3 island platforms)
- Tracks: 6
- Connections: Huangtudian railway station (BCR)

Construction
- Structure type: Underground (Line 8); At-grade (Line 13)
- Accessible: Yes

Other information
- Station code: 1309 (Line 13)

History
- Opened: December 31, 2011; 14 years ago (Line 8); September 28, 2002; 23 years ago (Line 13)

Services
Preceding station	Beijing Subway	Following station
Huilongguan Dongdajie towards Zhuxinzhuang	Line 8	Yuxin towards Yinghai
Huilong Guan towards Xizhimen	Line 13	Lishui Qiao towards Dongzhimen
Location
- Location within Beijing

Huoying station (simplified Chinese: 霍营站; traditional Chinese: 霍營站; pinyin: Huòyíng zhàn) is an interchange station on Line 8 and Line 13 of the Beijing Subway, and Line S2 of the Beijing Suburban Railway.

== History ==
The station for Line 13 opened on September 28, 2002. It was the terminus of Line 13 between September 28, 2002, and January 9, 2003.

The station for Line 8 opened on December 31, 2011.

== Station layout ==
The Line 8 station has an underground island platform. The Line 13 station has at-grade dual-island platforms. The outer eastbound Line 13 platform is a terminating platform.

== Exits ==
There are nine exits, lettered A, E, F1, F2, G1, G2, G3, G4, and H. Exits F1 and G1 are accessible.

== Gallery ==
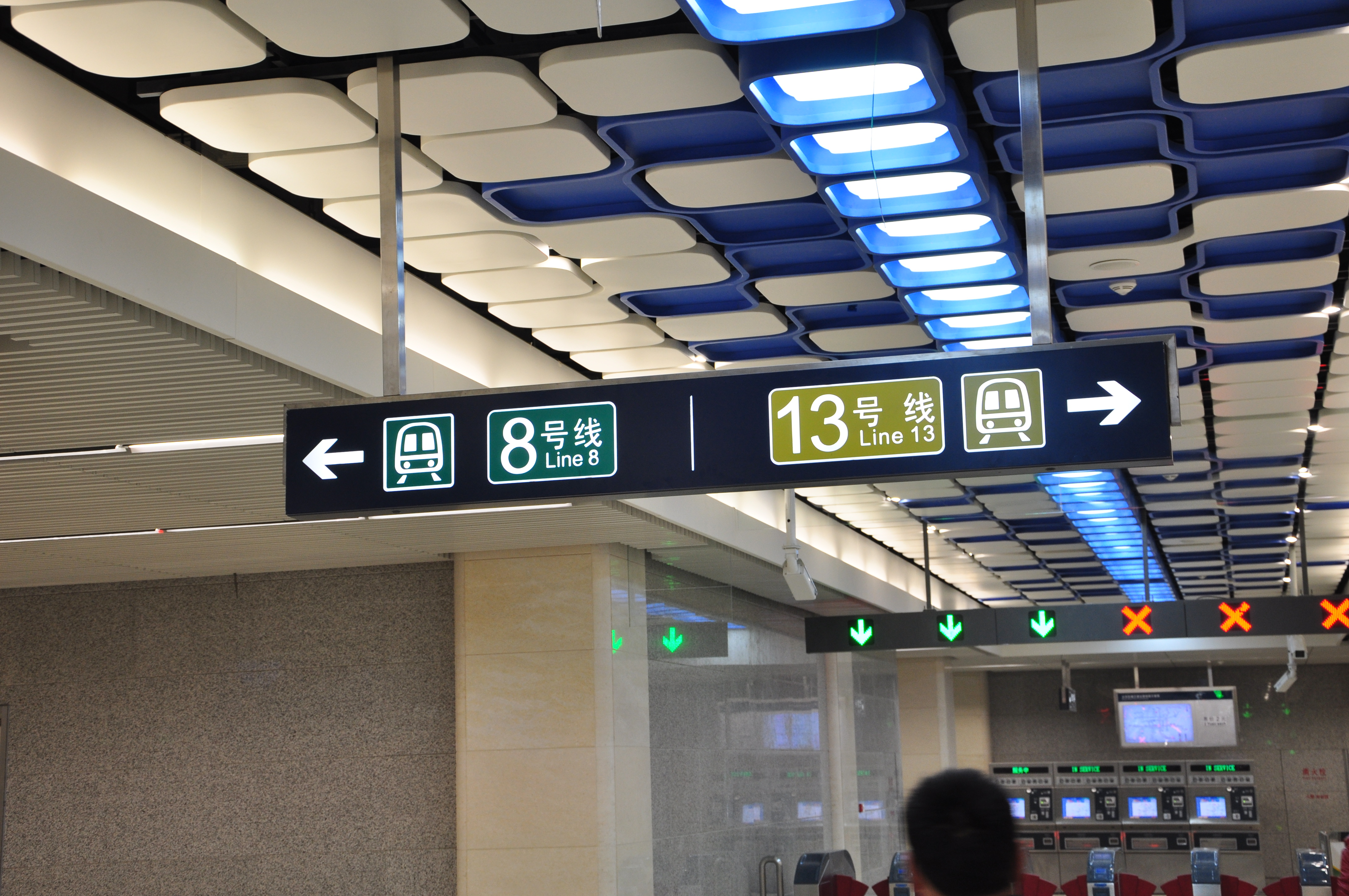
Station signage

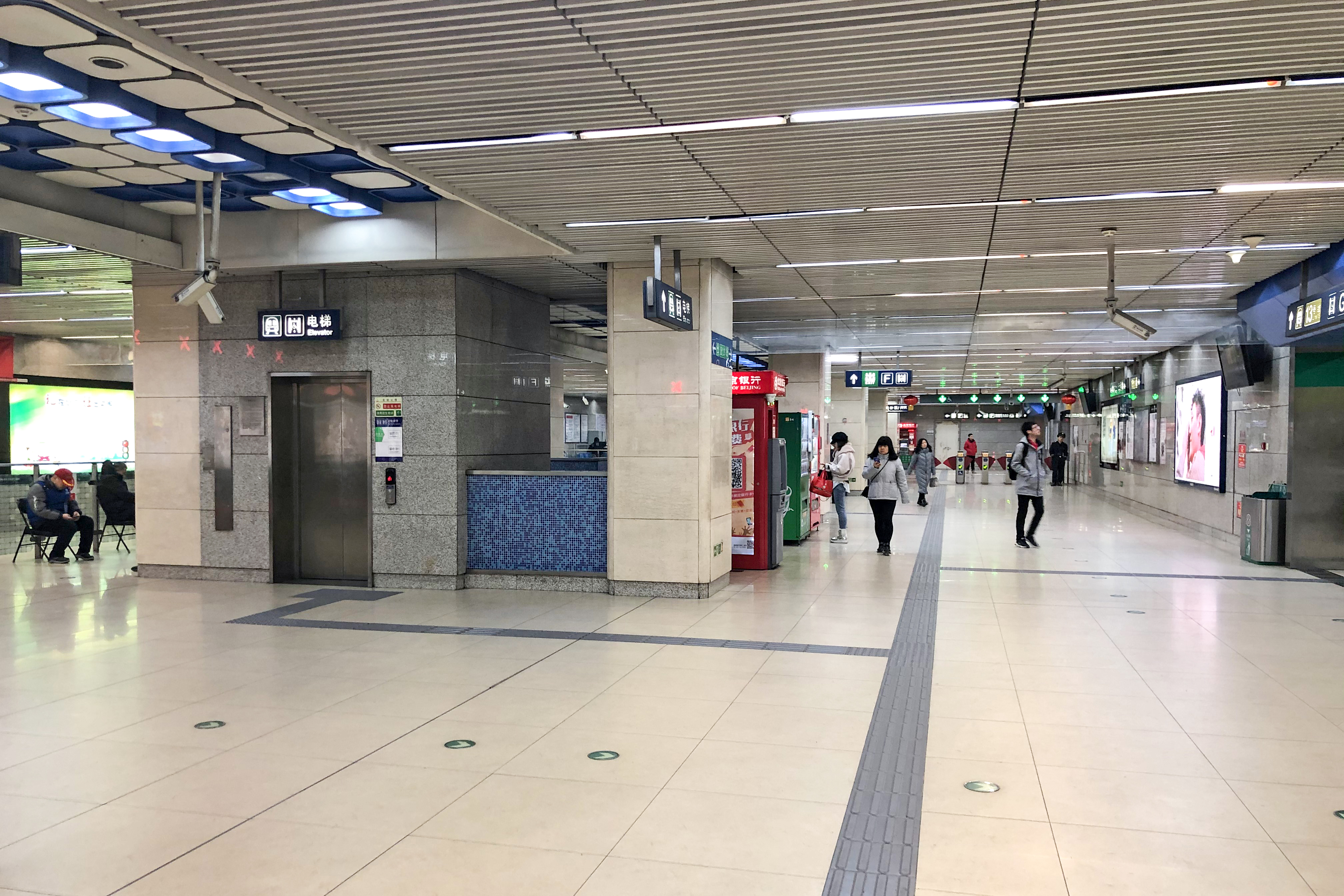
Line 8 concourse

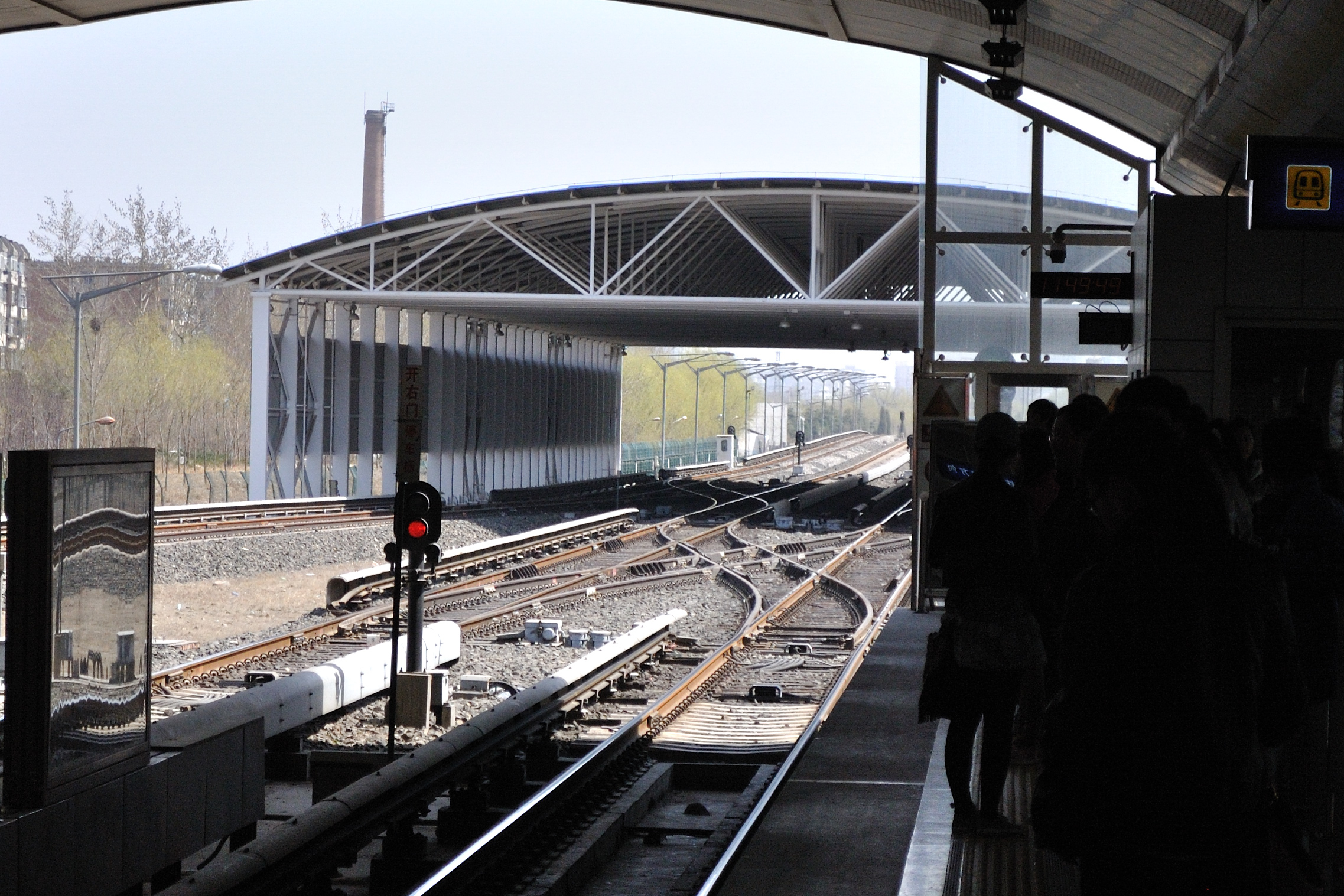
Line 13 tracks

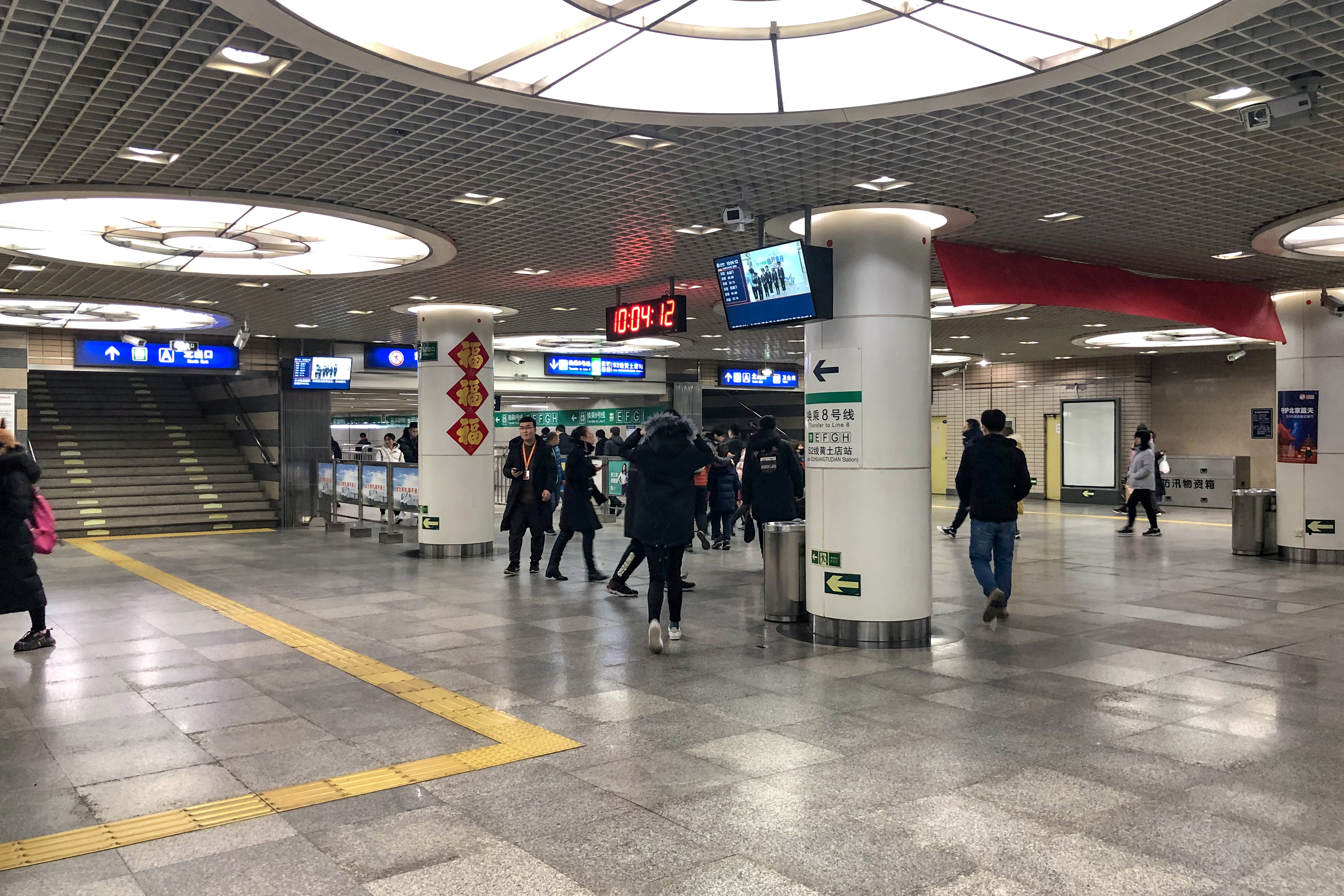
Line 13 concourse

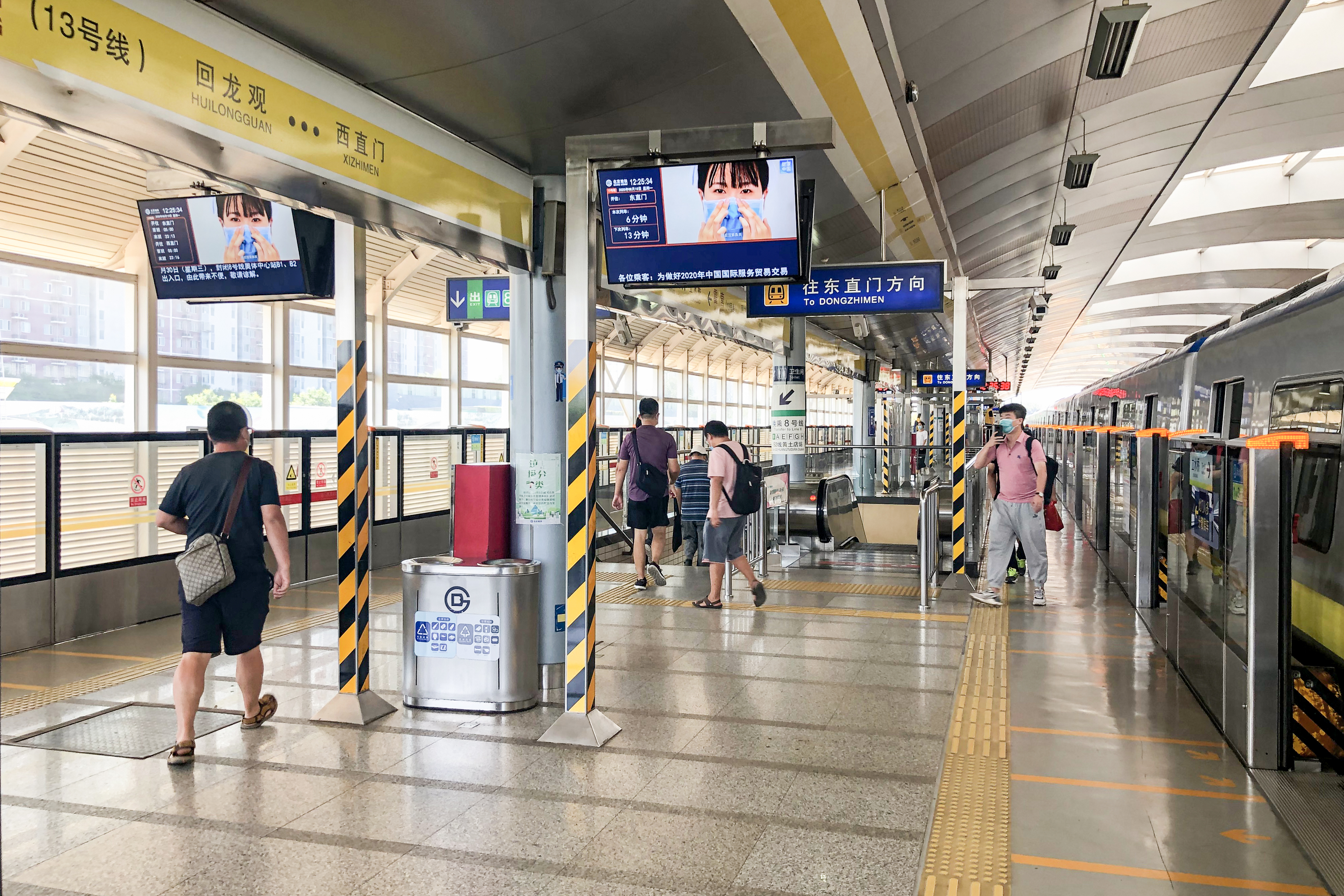
Line 13 eastbound platform (August 2020)

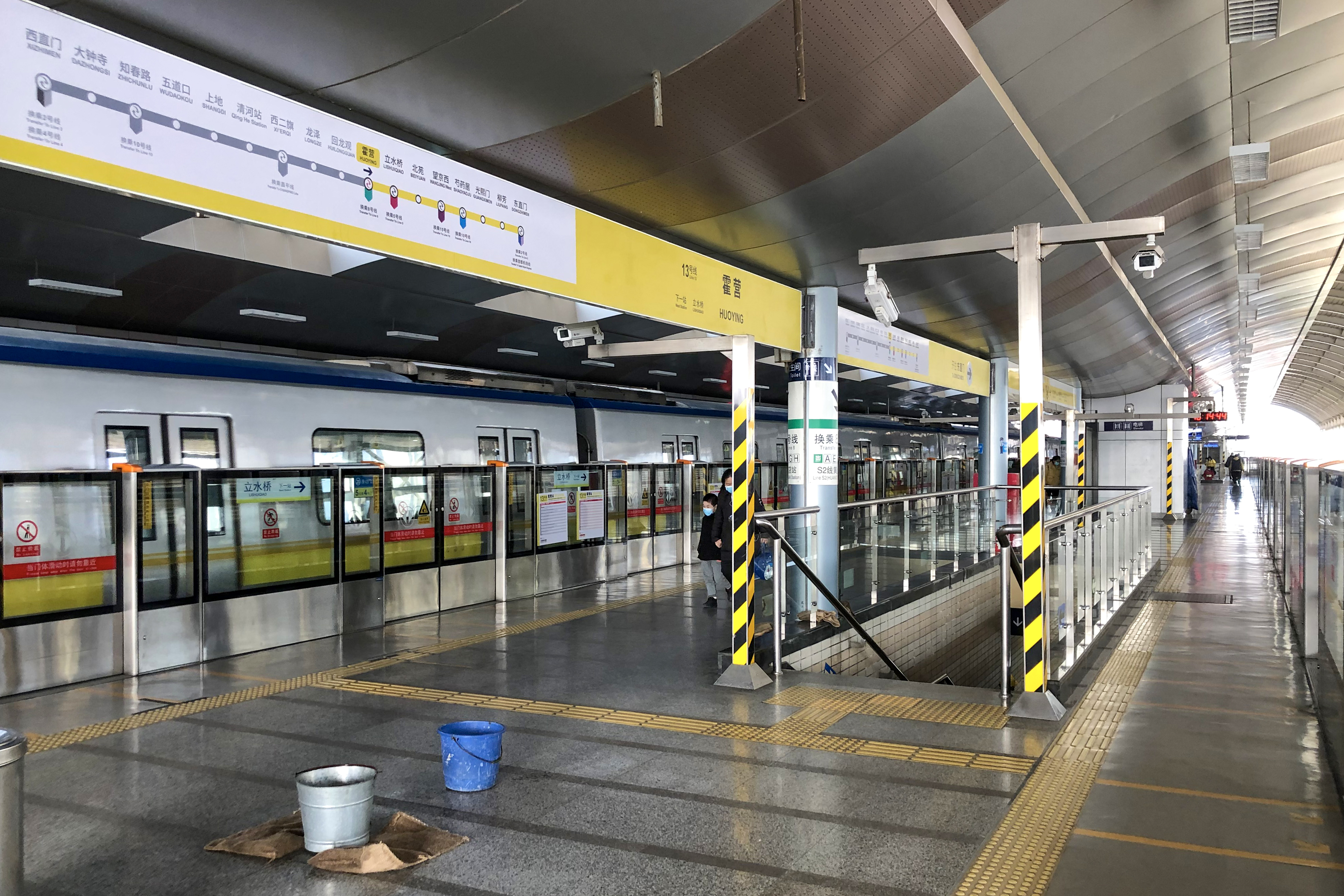
Line 13 eastbound platform (March 2021)
