= Yuzhi Lu station =

Beijing Subway station

Yuzhi Lu 育知路
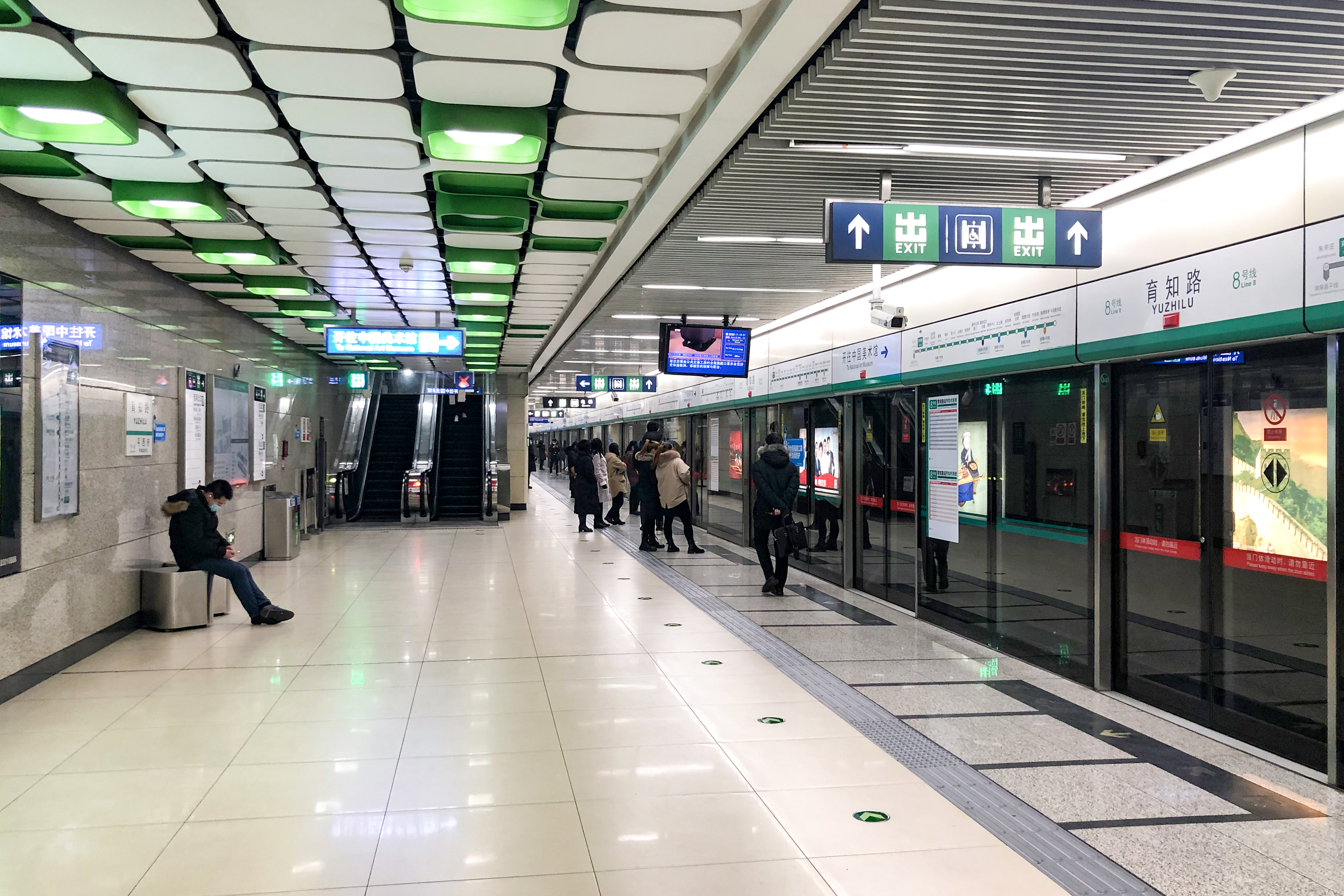
- Southbound platform

General information
- Location: Huinan North Road (回南北路) and Yuzhi Road (育知路); Border of Shigezhuang Subdistrict and Longzeyuan Subdistrict, Changping District, Beijing; China
- Coordinates: 40.0878°N 116.3265°E
- Operator: Beijing Mass Transit Railway Operation Corporation Limited
- Line: Line 8
- Platforms: 2 (2 side platforms)
- Tracks: 2

Construction
- Structure type: Underground
- Accessible: Yes

History
- Opened: December 28, 2013; 12 years ago

Services
Preceding station	Beijing Subway	Following station
Zhuxinzhuang Terminus	Line 8	Pingxi Fu towards Yinghai
Location
- Location within Beijing

Yuzhi Lu station (Chinese: 育知路站; pinyin: Yùzhīlù zhàn; lit. 'Yuzhi Road station') is a station on Line 8 of the Beijing Subway.

== Station layout ==
The station has 2 underground side platforms.

== Exits ==
There are 3 exits, lettered A, B, and D. Exit A is accessible.
