= Pingxi Fu station =

Beijing Subway station

Pingxi Fu 平西府
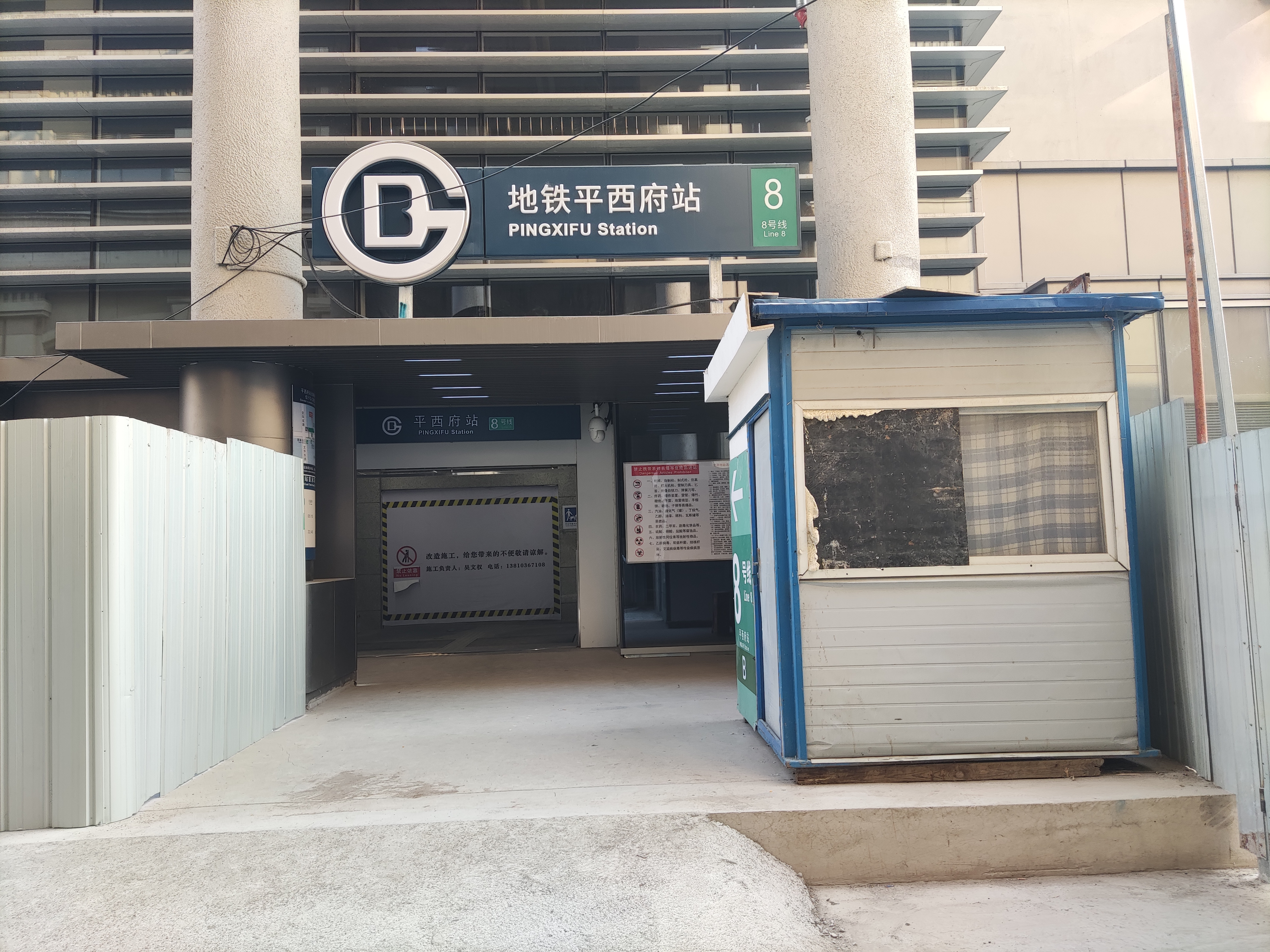
- Exit B (New Northeast Exit)

General information
- Location: Huinan North Road (回南北路) and Wenhua East Road (文华东路); Border of Dongxiaokou and Huoying Subdistrict, Changping District, Beijing; China
- Coordinates: 40°05′26″N 116°21′02″E
- Operator: Beijing Mass Transit Railway Operation Corporation Limited
- Line: Line 8
- Platforms: 2 (2 side platforms)
- Tracks: 2

Construction
- Structure type: Underground
- Accessible: Yes

History
- Opened: December 28, 2013; 12 years ago

Services
Preceding station	Beijing Subway	Following station
Yuzhi Lu towards Zhuxinzhuang	Line 8	Huilongguan Dongdajie towards Yinghai
Location
- Location within Beijing

Pingxi Fu station (Chinese: 平西府站; pinyin: Píngxīfǔ zhàn) is a station on Line 8 of the Beijing Subway.

== Name and location ==
The metro station is named after Pingxifu Village in Beiqijia, Changping District, Beijing. The station is actually located near the former site of Maliandian Village (now Maliandian Jiayuan Community) in Dongxiaokou, Changping District, Beijing.

== Station layout ==
The station has 2 underground side platforms.

== Exits ==
There are 4 exits in operation, lettered B, D1, D2, and D3. Exit D1 is accessible.

In addition, Exit C1 is under planning.

== Gallery ==
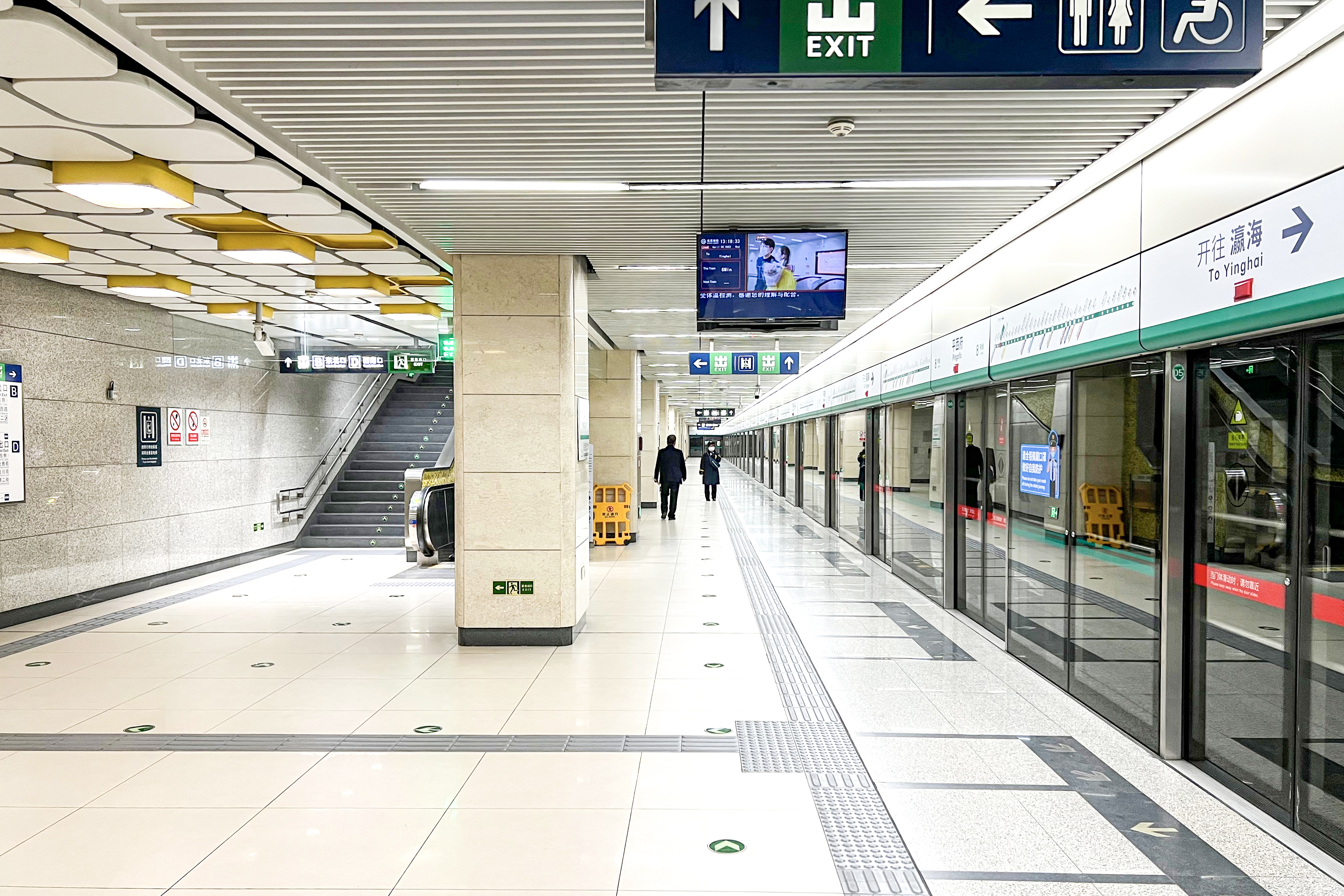
Southbound Platform

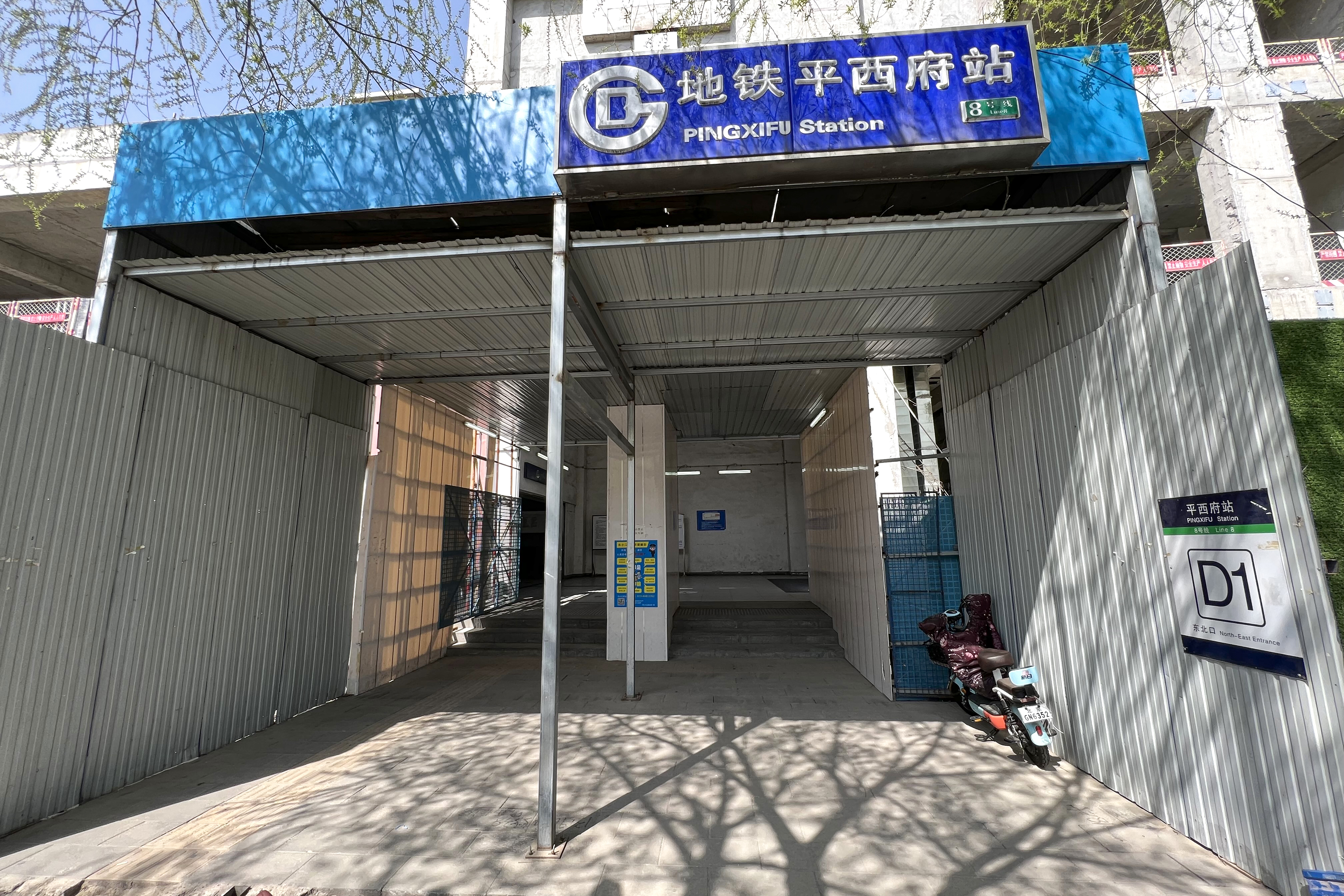
Exit D1

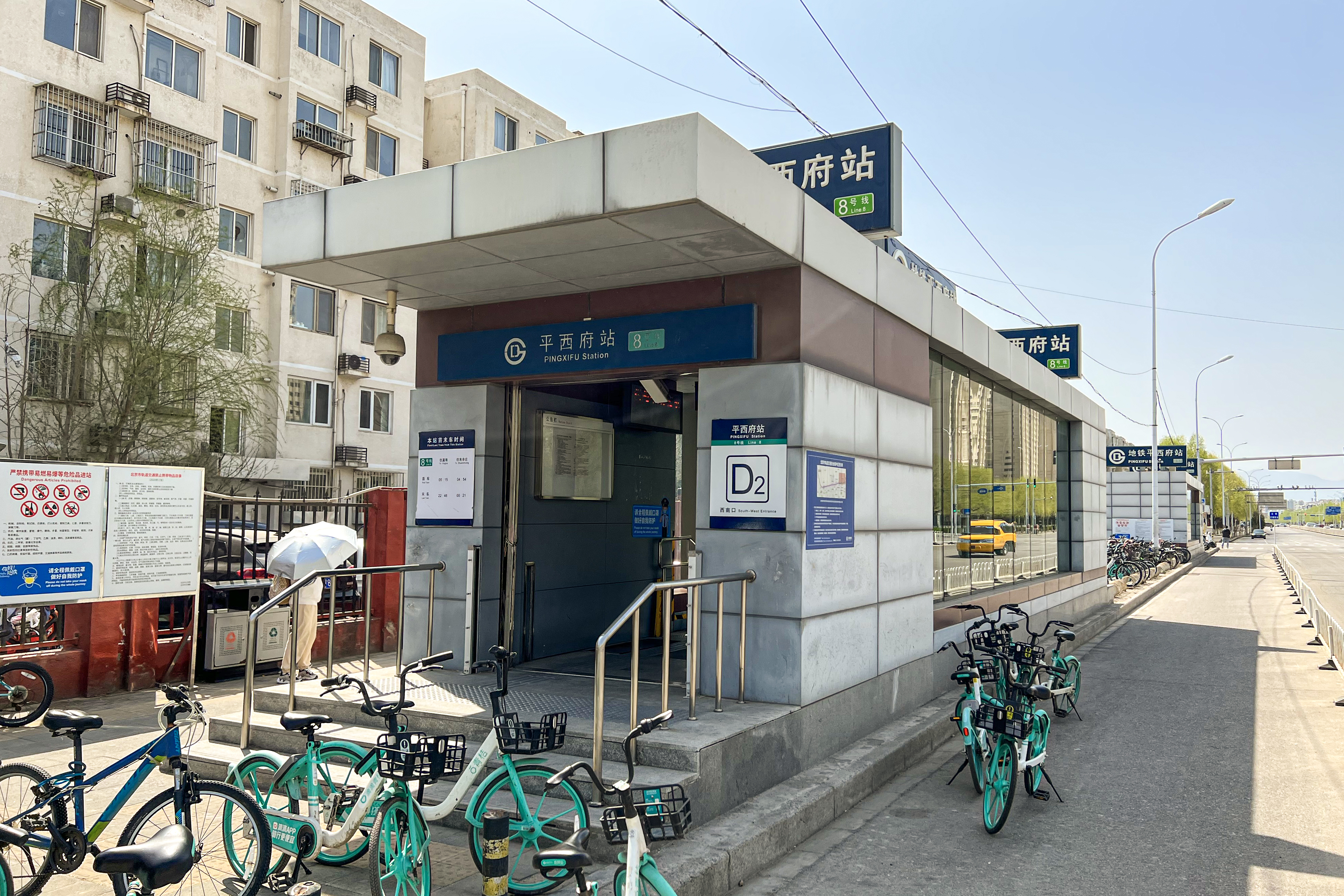
Exit D2

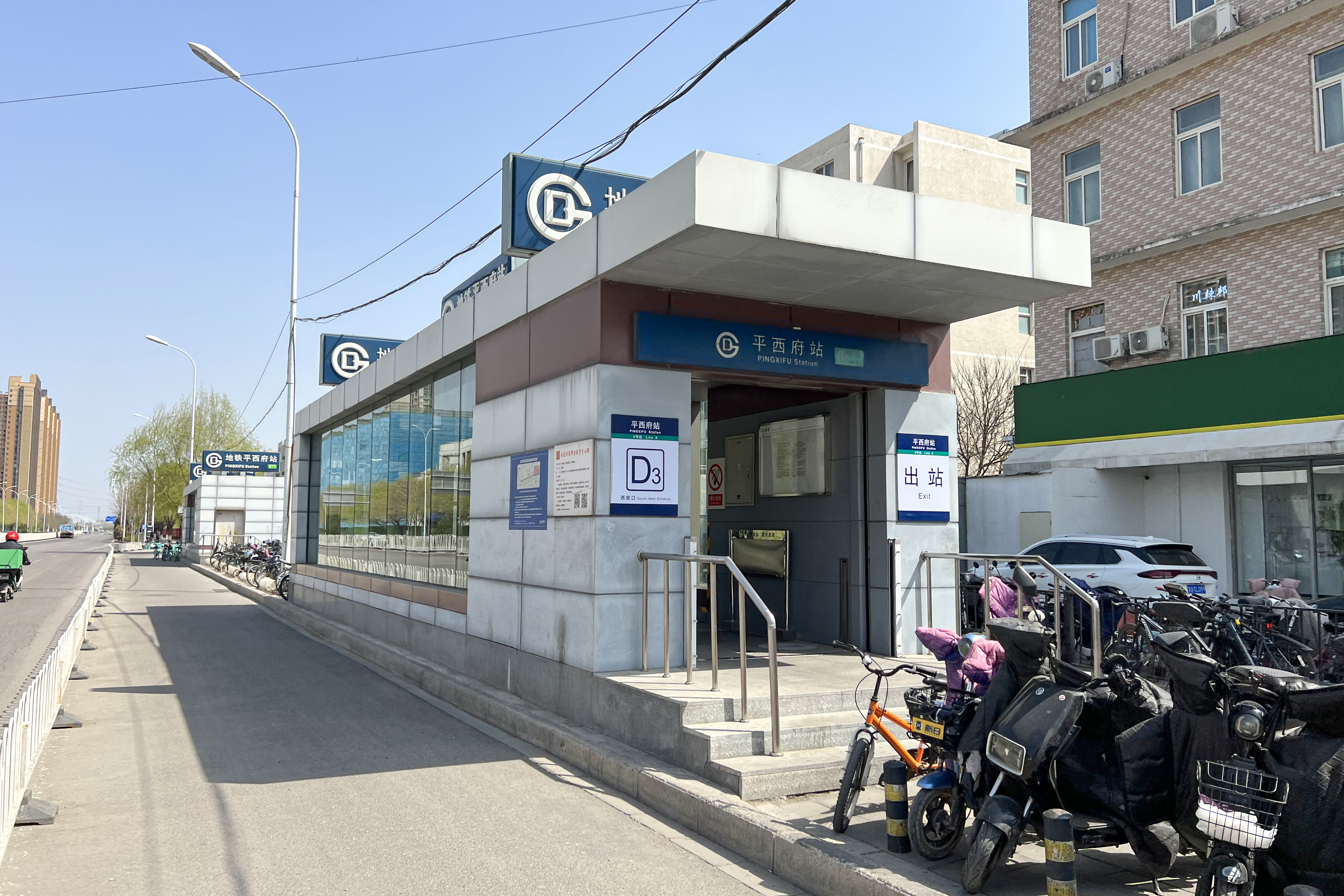
Exit D3
