= Shigezhuang Subdistrict =

Shigezhuang Subdistrict 史各庄街道
- Subdistrict
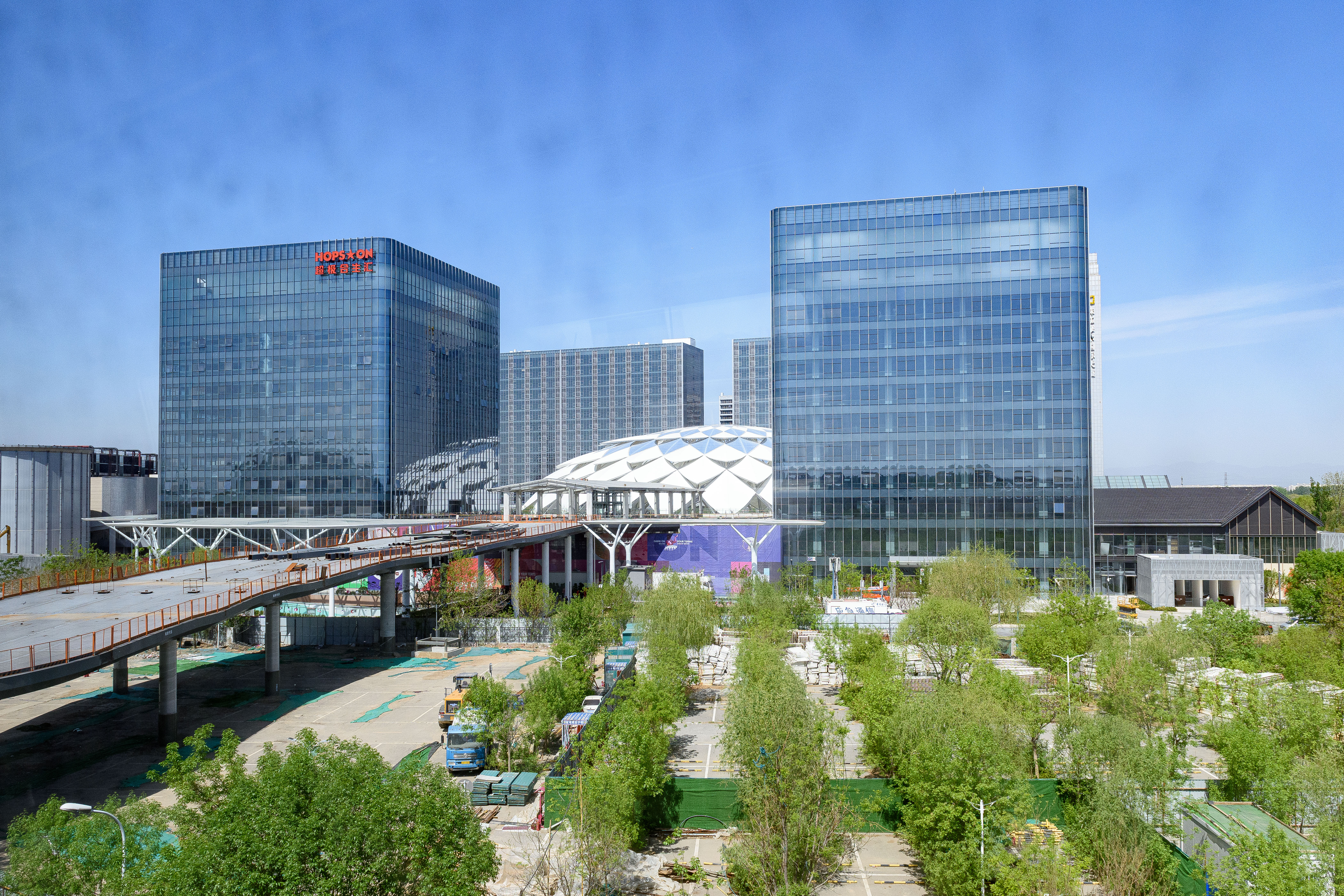
- HOPS ON Beijing within the subdistrict, 2024

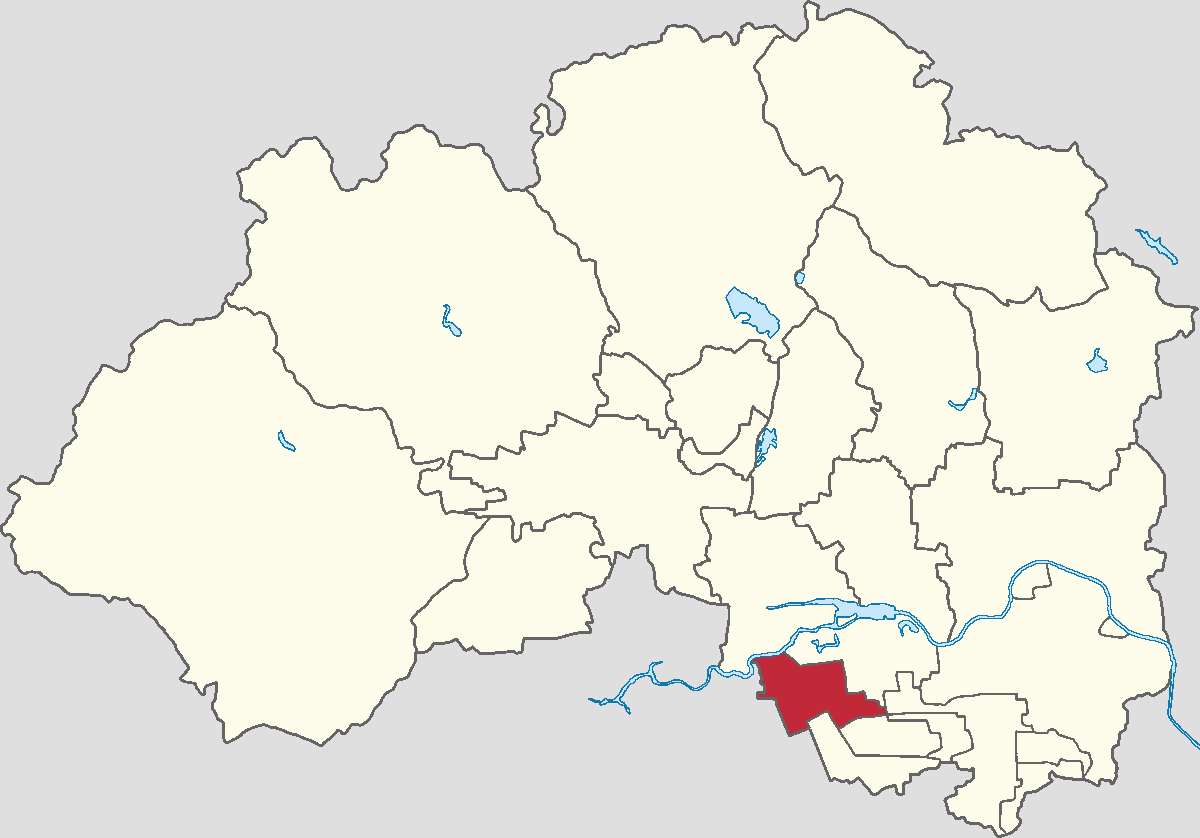
- Location of Shigezhuang Subdistrict within Changping District

- Location within Beijing Location within China
- Coordinates: 40°06′04″N 116°16′45″E
- Country: China
- Municipality: Beijing
- District: Changping
- Village-level Divisions: 4 communities 5 villages

Area
  - Total: 9.95 km^{2} (3.84 sq mi)
- Elevation: 44 m (144 ft)

Population (2020)
  - Total: 64,910
  - Density: 6,520/km^{2} (16,900/sq mi)
- Time zone: UTC+8 (China Standard)
- Postal code: 102206
- Area code: 010

Shigezhuang Subdistrict (simplified Chinese: 史各庄街道; traditional Chinese: 史各莊街道; pinyin: Shǐgèzhuāng Jiēdào) is a subdistrict situated on southern Changping District, Beijing, China. It borders Shahe Town to the north, Dingxiaokou Town to the east, Huilongguan and Longzeyuan Subdistricts to the southeast, and Xibeiwang Town to the southwest. In 2020, the population of Shigezhuang was 64,910.

== History ==
History of Shigezhuang Subdistrict
Year	Status	Under
1961–1983	Shigezhuang Management District, within Shahe Sino-Vietnamese Friendship People's Commune	Changping County
1983–1999	Shigezhuang Township	Changping County
1999–2015	Part of Huilongguan Town	Changping District
2015–present	Shigezhuang Subdistrict	Changping District

== Administrative divisions ==
In the year 2021, Shigezhuang Subdistrict was divided into 9 subdivisions, where 4 of them were communities, and 5 were villages:

Administrative division code	Subdivision names	Name transliteration	Type
110114013001	农学院	Nongxueyuan	Community
110114013002	昌艺园	Changyiyuan	Community
110114013003	领秀慧谷	Lingxiu Huigu	Community
110114013004	领秀慧谷北	Lingxiu Huigubei	Community
110114013201	朱辛庄	Zhuxinzhuang	Village
110114013202	东半壁店	Dongbanbidian	Village
110114013203	西半壁店	Xibanbidian	Village
110114013204	定福皇庄	Dingfuhuangzhuang	Village
110114013205	史各庄	Shigezhuang	Village

== Gallery ==
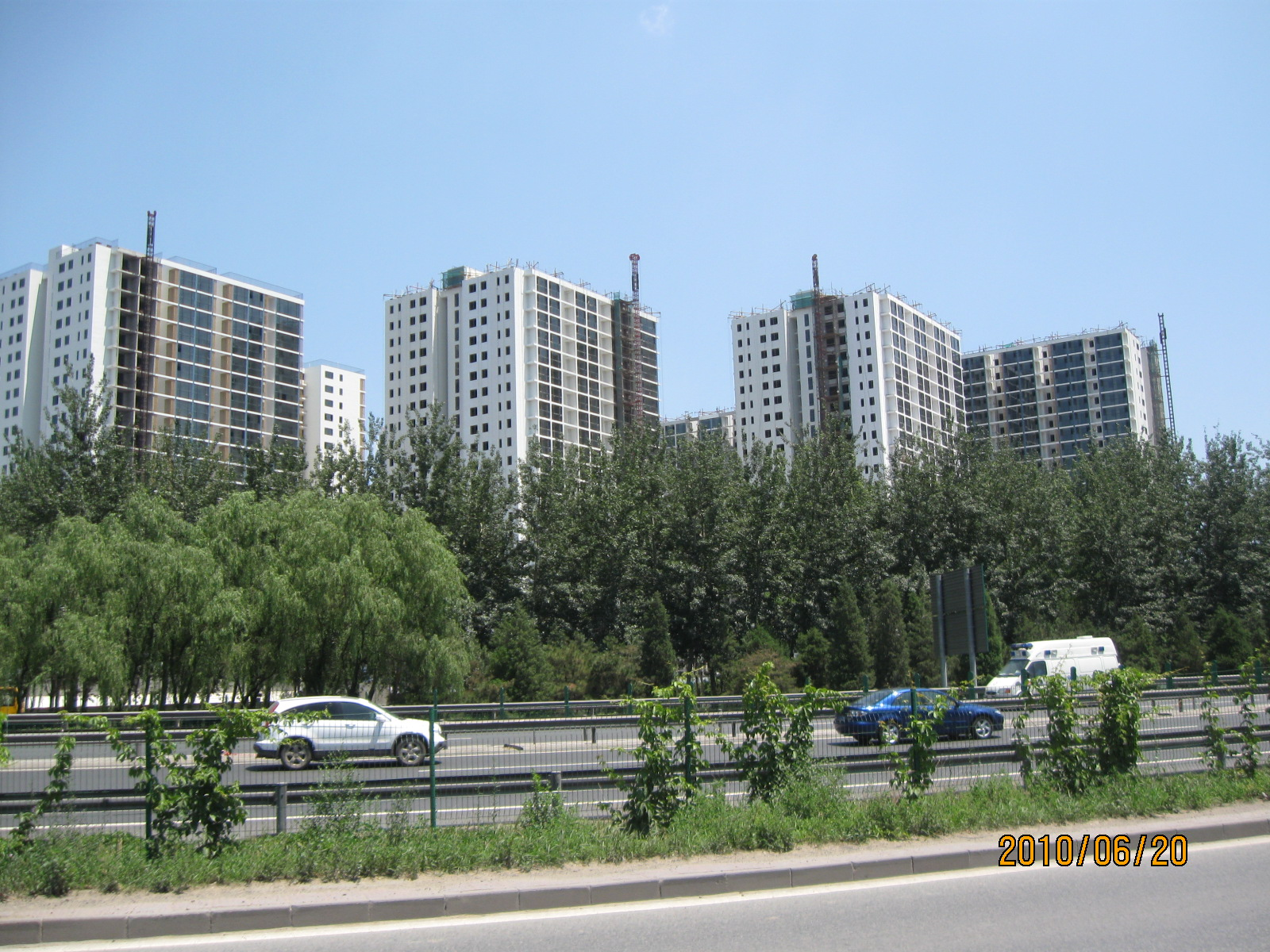
Fazhan Road within Shigezhuang, 2010

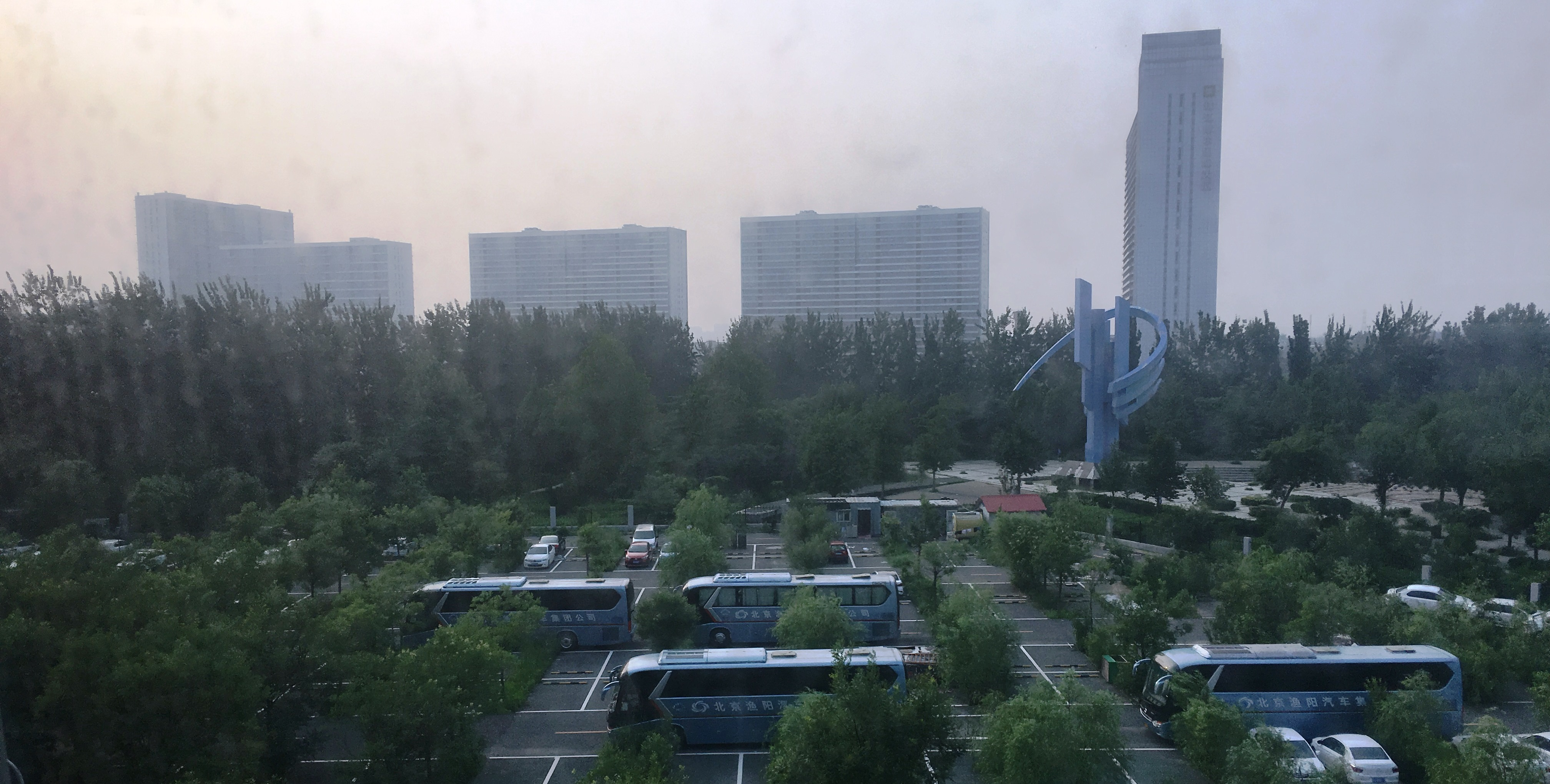
Life Science Park, 2017

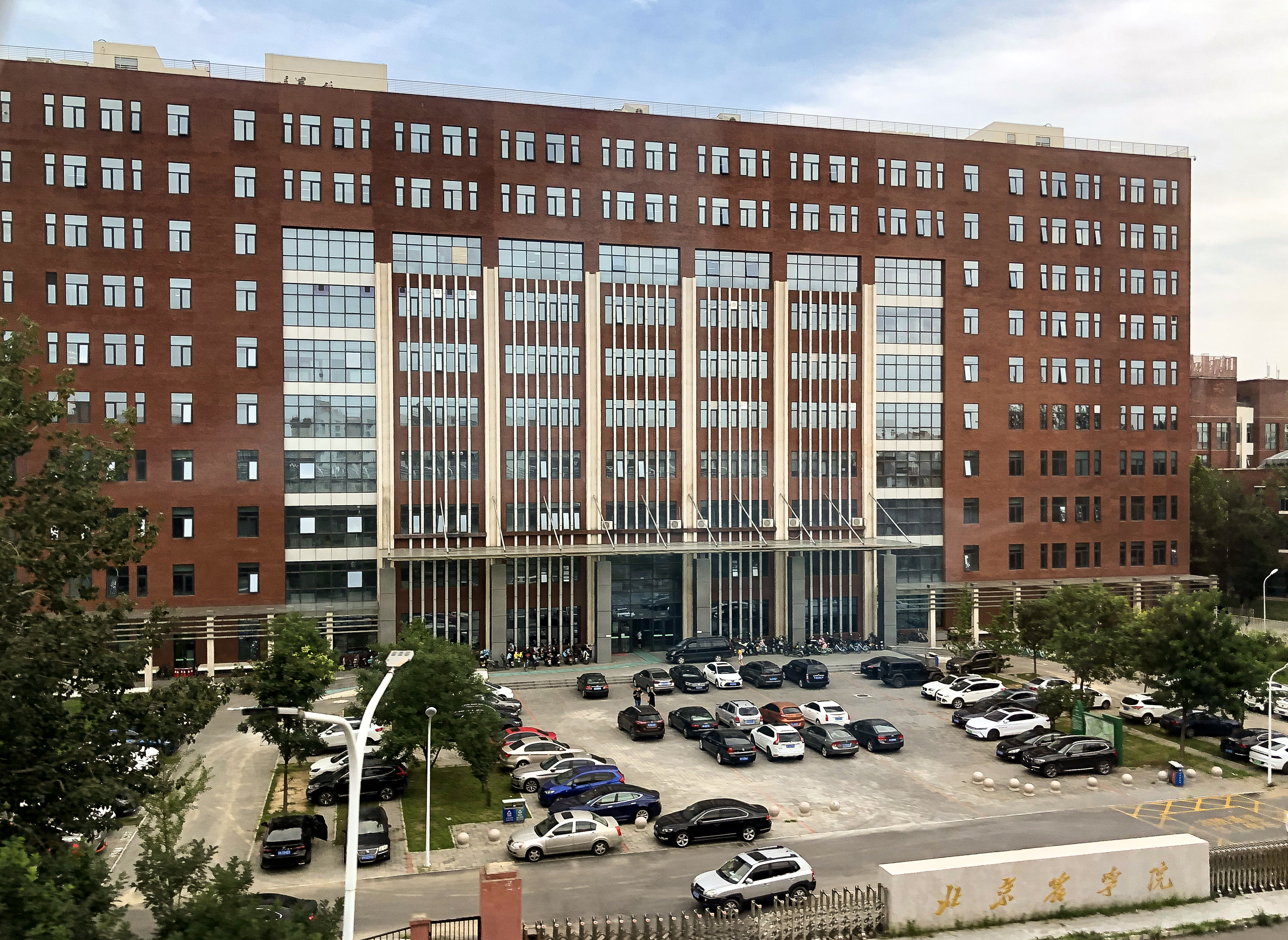
Beijing University of Agriculture, 2021

== See also ==
- List of township-level divisions of Beijing
