= Huilongguan Subdistrict =

Huilongguan Subdistrict 回龙观街道
- Subdistrict
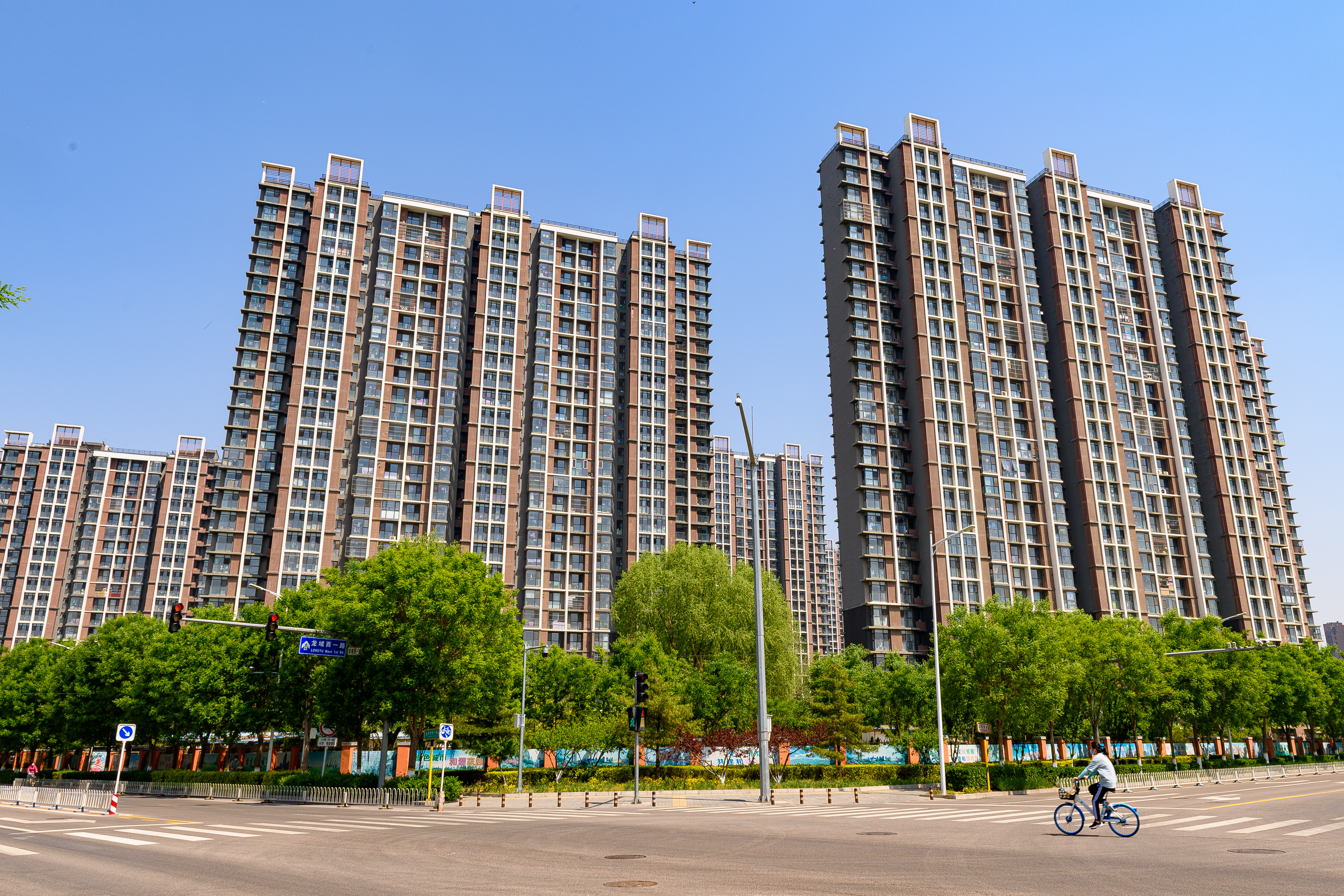
- Buildings in 2022

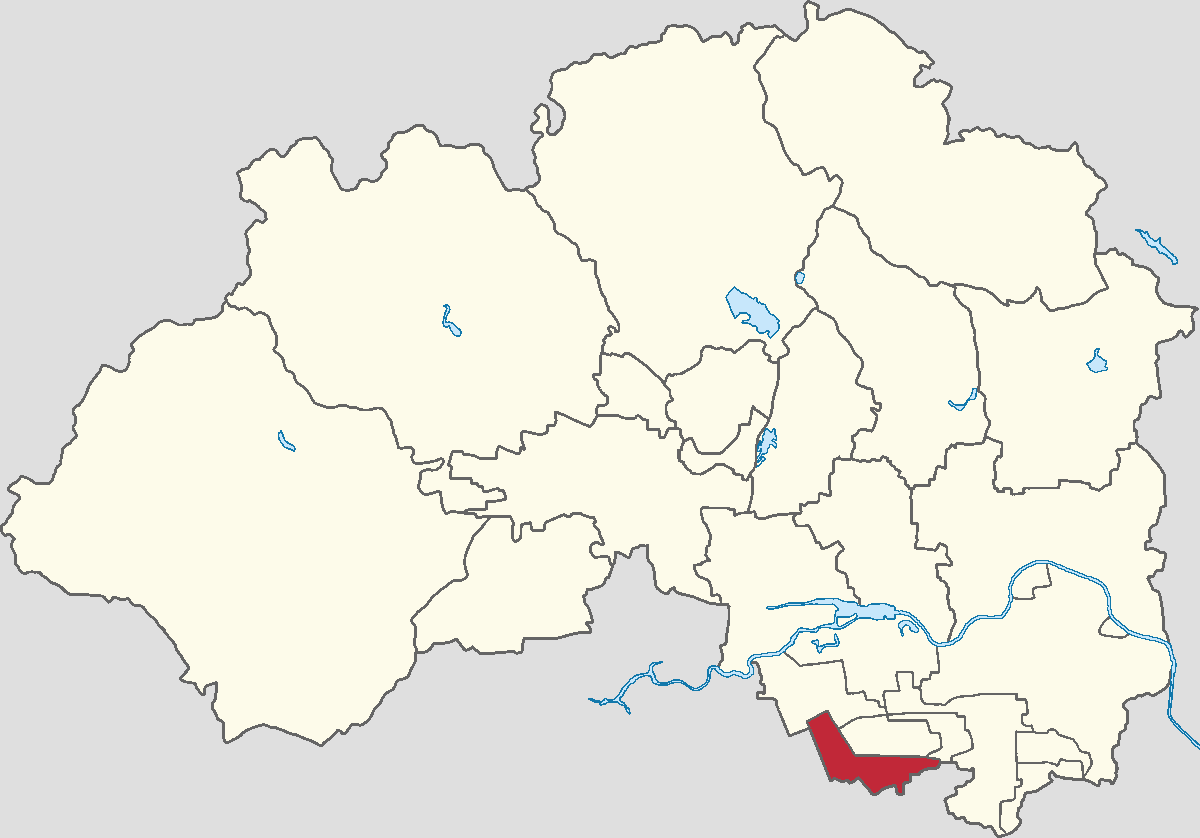
- Location of Huilongguan Subdistrict within Changping District

- Location within Beijing Location within China
- Coordinates: 40°03′48″N 116°19′06″E
- Country: China
- Municipality: Beijing
- District: Changping
- Village-level Divisions: 23 communities 2 villages

Area
  - Total: 9.2 km^{2} (3.6 sq mi)
- Elevation: 47 m (154 ft)

Population (2020)
  - Total: 166,074
  - Density: 18,000/km^{2} (47,000/sq mi)
- Time zone: UTC+8 (China Standard)
- Postal code: 102208
- Area code: 010

Huilongguan Subdistrict (simplified Chinese: 回龙观街道; traditional Chinese: 回龍觀街道; pinyin: Huílóngguàn Jiēdào) is a subdistrict situated within the 6th Ring Road and Changping District, Beijing, China. It borders Shigezhuang, Longzeyuan and Huoying Subdistricts in its north, Xisanqi Subdistrict in its east and south, Dongsheng Town and Qinghe Subdistrict in its south, and Xibeiwang Town in its west. Its total population was 166,074 in the 2020 census.

Huilongguan Village used to host a Taoist temple named Xuanfu Palace, which was constructed under the mandate of Hongzhi Emperor in 1504. After its completion in 1516, the temple served as a stopping point for Ming emperors on their way to hold memorial services for their ancestors. Since Chinese emperors were often referred to as Chinese dragons, the temple and the village surrounding it later earned the name of Huilongguan (Chinese: 回龙观; lit. 'Returning Dragon Temple').

== History ==
Timeline of Huilongguan Subdistrict
Year	Status	Belonged to
1983–1990	Huilongguan Township	Changping County
1990–1999	Huilongguan Town (Integrated Shigezhuang Township in 1999)	Changping County
1999–2004	Huilongguan Town (Integrated Shigezhuang Township in 1999)	Changping District
2004–2015	Huilongguan Area	Changping District
2015–present	Huilongguan Subdistrict (northern portions formed Longzeyuan and Shigezhuang Subdistricts)	Changping District

== Administrative divisions ==
As of 2021, Huilongguan Subdistrict consisted of 25 subdivisions, with 23 of them being communities, and the other 2 being villages:

Administrative division code	Subdivision names	Name transliteration	Type
110114011001	龙博苑	Longboyuan	Community
110114011002	万润家园	Wanrun Jiayuan	Community
110114011003	龙城	Longcheng	Community
110114011004	万龙	Wanlong	Community
110114011005	东村家园	Dongcun Jiayuan	Community
110114011006	龙乡	Longxiang	Community
110114011007	吉晟别墅	Jisheng Bieshu	Community
110114011008	南店	Nandian	Community
110114011010	金榜园	Jinbangyuan	Community
110114011011	新康园	Xinkangyuan	Community
110114011012	龙兴园	Longxingyuan	Community
110114011013	龙兴园北区	Longxingyuan Beiqu	Community
110114011014	瑞旗家园	Ruiqi Jiayuan	Community
110114011015	二拨子	Erbozi	Community
110114011016	蓝天嘉园	Lantian Jiayuan	Community
110114011017	回龙观新村	Huilongguan Xincun	Community
110114011018	融泽家园一区	Rongze Jiayuan Yiqu	Community
110114011019	融泽家园二区	Rongze Jiayuan Erqu	Community
110114011020	金域华府	Jinyu Huafu	Community
110114011021	金域国际	Jinyu Guoji	Community
110114011022	融泽家园三区	Rongze Jiayuan Sanqu	Community
110114011023	新龙城西区	Xinlongcheng Xiqu	Community
110114011024	新龙城东区	Xinlongcheng Dongqu	Community
110114011201	回龙观	Huilongguan	Village
110114011202	二拨子	Erbozi	Village

== Gallery ==
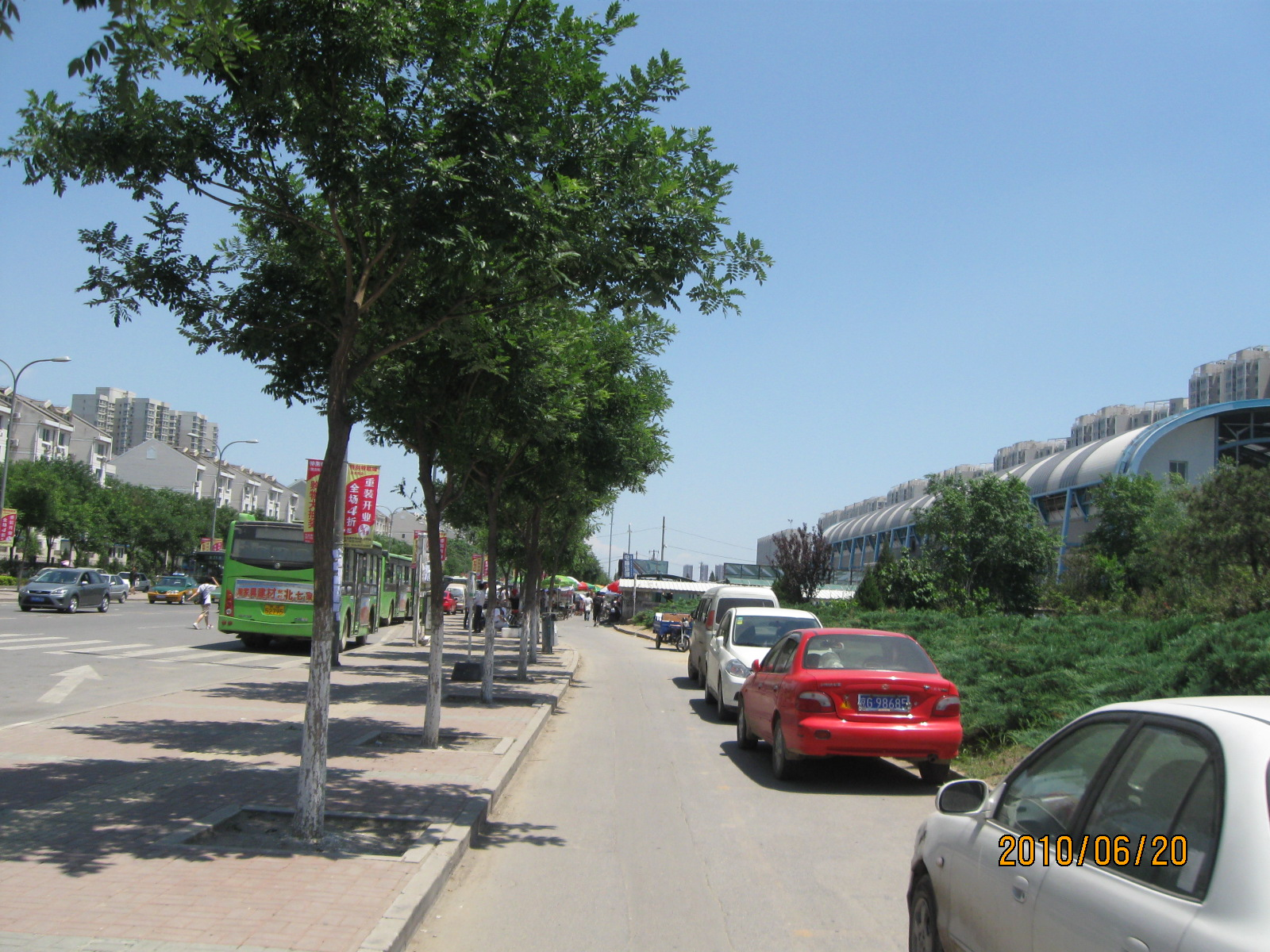
Huicheng Road on the north of the subdistrict, 2010

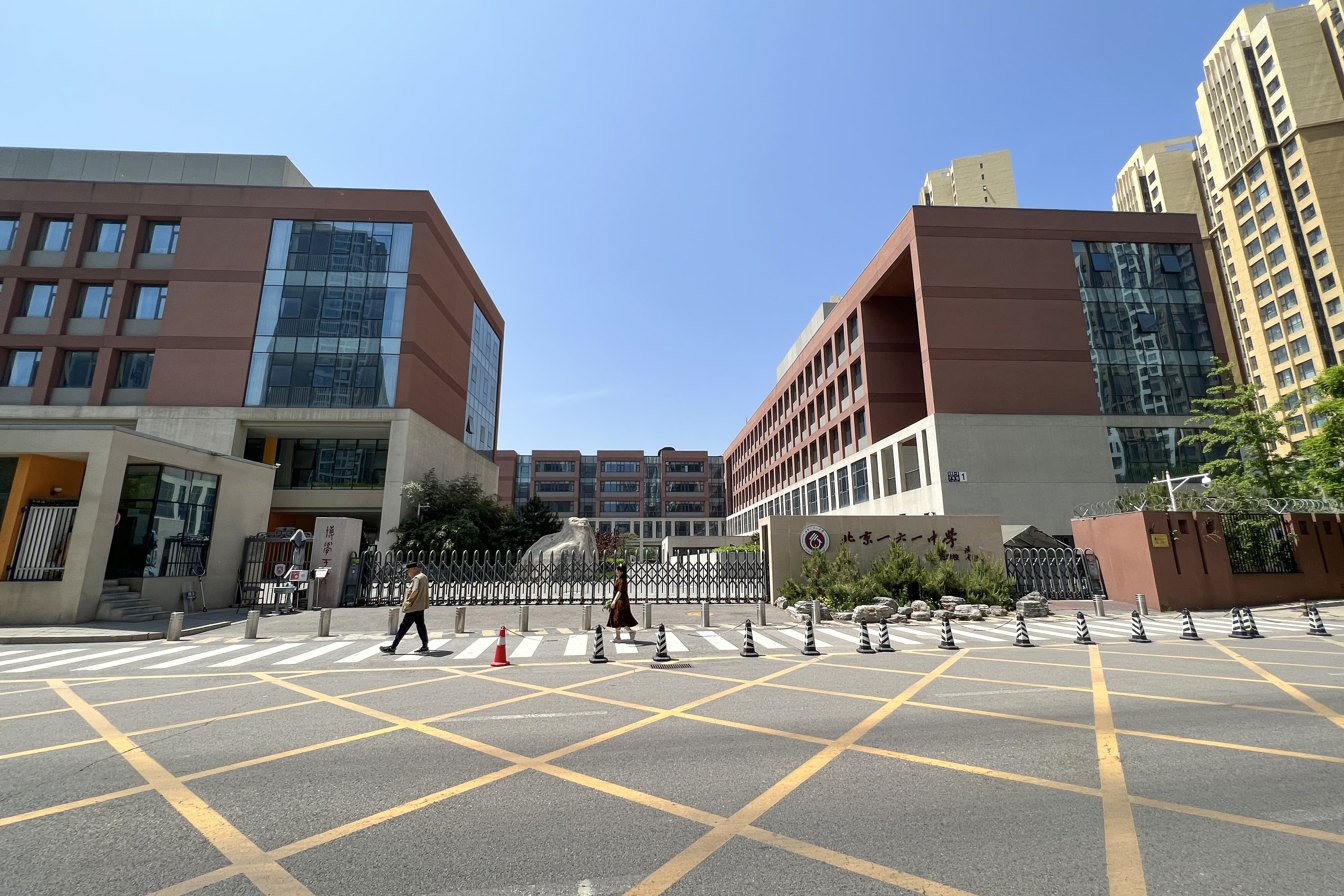
Huilongguan School of Beijing No. 161 High School, 2022

== Transport ==
- Longzexi station (Line 18)
