= Xisanqi Subdistrict =

Xisanqi Subdistrict 西三旗街道
- Subdistrict
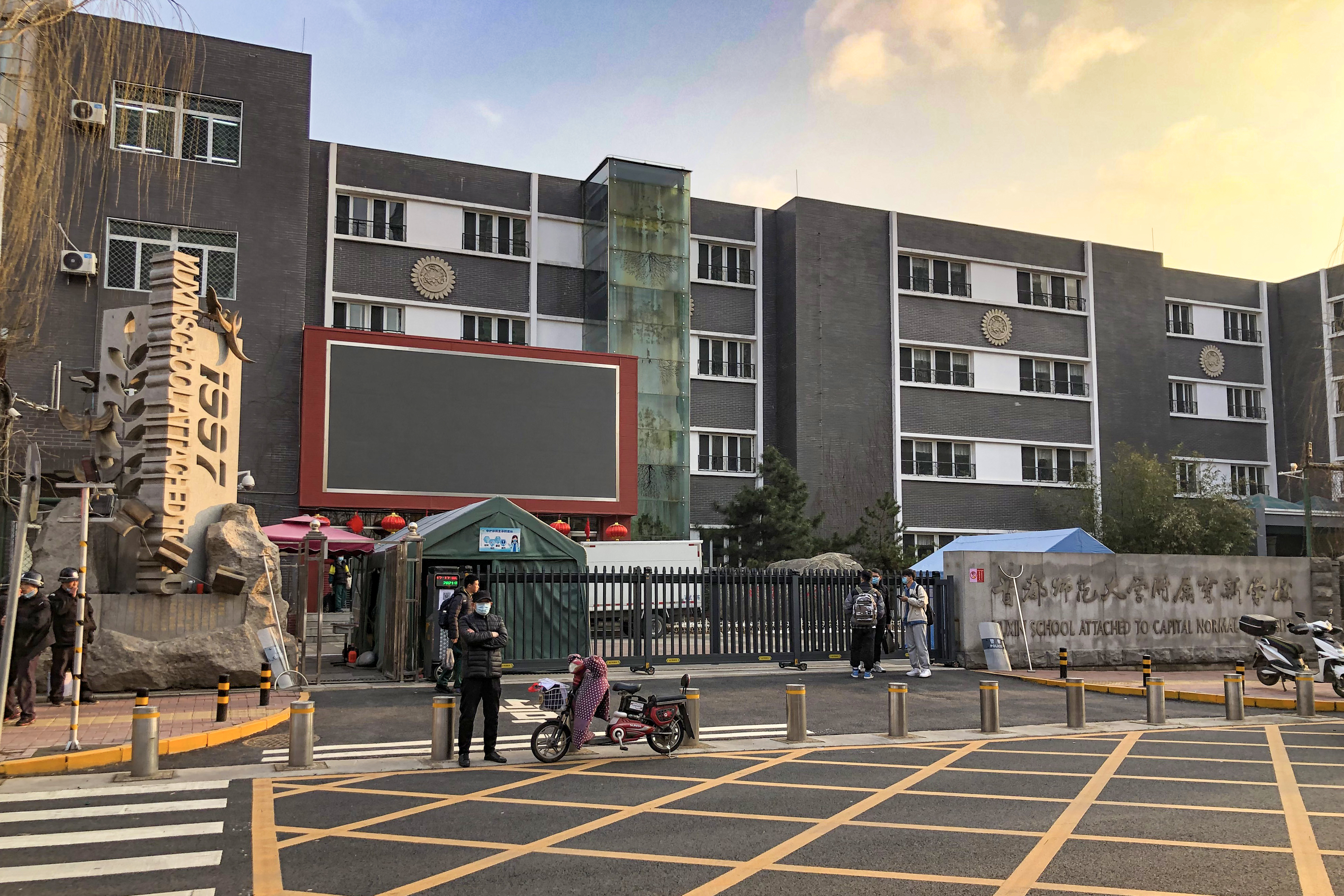
- Yuxin School of the Capital Normal University, 2021

- Location within Beijing Location within China
- Coordinates: 40°01′41″N 116°20′38″E
- Country: China
- Municipality: Beijing
- District: Haidian
- Village-level Divisions: 27 communities

Area
  - Total: 8.56 km^{2} (3.31 sq mi)

Population (2020)
  - Total: 157,643
  - Density: 18,400/km^{2} (47,700/sq mi)
- Time zone: UTC+8 (China Standard)
- Postal code: 100192
- Area code: 010

Xisanqi Subdistrict (Chinese: 西三旗街道; pinyin: Xīsānqí Jiēdào) is a subdistrict inside of Haidian District, Beijing, China. It borders Huilongguan and Huoying Subdistricts to the north, Dongxiaokou and Dongsheng Towns to the east, Aoyuncun Subdistrict to the south, and Qinghe Subdistrict to the west. Its population was 157,643 in 2020.

The name Xisanqi (Chinese: 西三旗; lit. 'West Three Banners') referred to the designation of the army stationed here during the Ming dynasty.

== History ==
In 1952, the subdistrict was still part of Dongjiao District of Beijing, and it was transferred to Haidian District in 1956. It was formally founded as a subdistrict in 2000.

== Administrative Divisions ==
Xisanqi Subdistrict was composed of 27 communities as of 2020:

Administrative division code	Subdivision names	Name transliteration
110108019003	永泰园第一	Yongtaiyuan Diyi
110108019004	清缘里	Qingyuanli
110108019005	建材西里	Jiancai Xili
110108019006	机械学院联合	Jixie Xueyuan Lianhe
110108019009	永泰西里	Yongtai Xili
110108019010	宝盛里	Baoshengli
110108019012	建材东里	Jiancai Dongli
110108019013	清缘东里	Qingyuan Dongli
110108019014	悦秀园	Yuexiuyuan
110108019015	电科院	Diankeyuan
110108019016	沁春家园	Qinchun Jiayuan
110108019018	育新花园	Yuxin Huayuan
110108019021	冶金研究院	Yejin Yanjiuyuan
110108019022	北新集团	Beixin Jituan
110108019023	9511工厂联合	9511 Gongchang Lianhe
110108019024	永泰庄	Yongtaizhuang
110108019025	清润家园	Qingrun Jiayuan
110108019026	永泰园第二	Yongtaiyuan Di'er
110108019027	建材城联合	Jiancaicheng Lianhe
110108019028	小营联合	Xiaoying Lianhe
110108019029	怡清园	Yiqingyuan
110108019030	枫丹丽舍	Fengdang Lishe
110108019032	知本时代	Zhiben Shidai
110108019033	清景园	Qingjingyuan
110108019034	清缘西里	Qingyuan Xili
110108019035	富力桃园	Fuli Taoyuan
110108019036	永泰东里	Yongtai Dongli

== See also ==
- List of township-level divisions of Beijing
