= Longzeyuan Subdistrict =

Longzeyuan Subdistrict 龙泽园街道
- Subdistrict
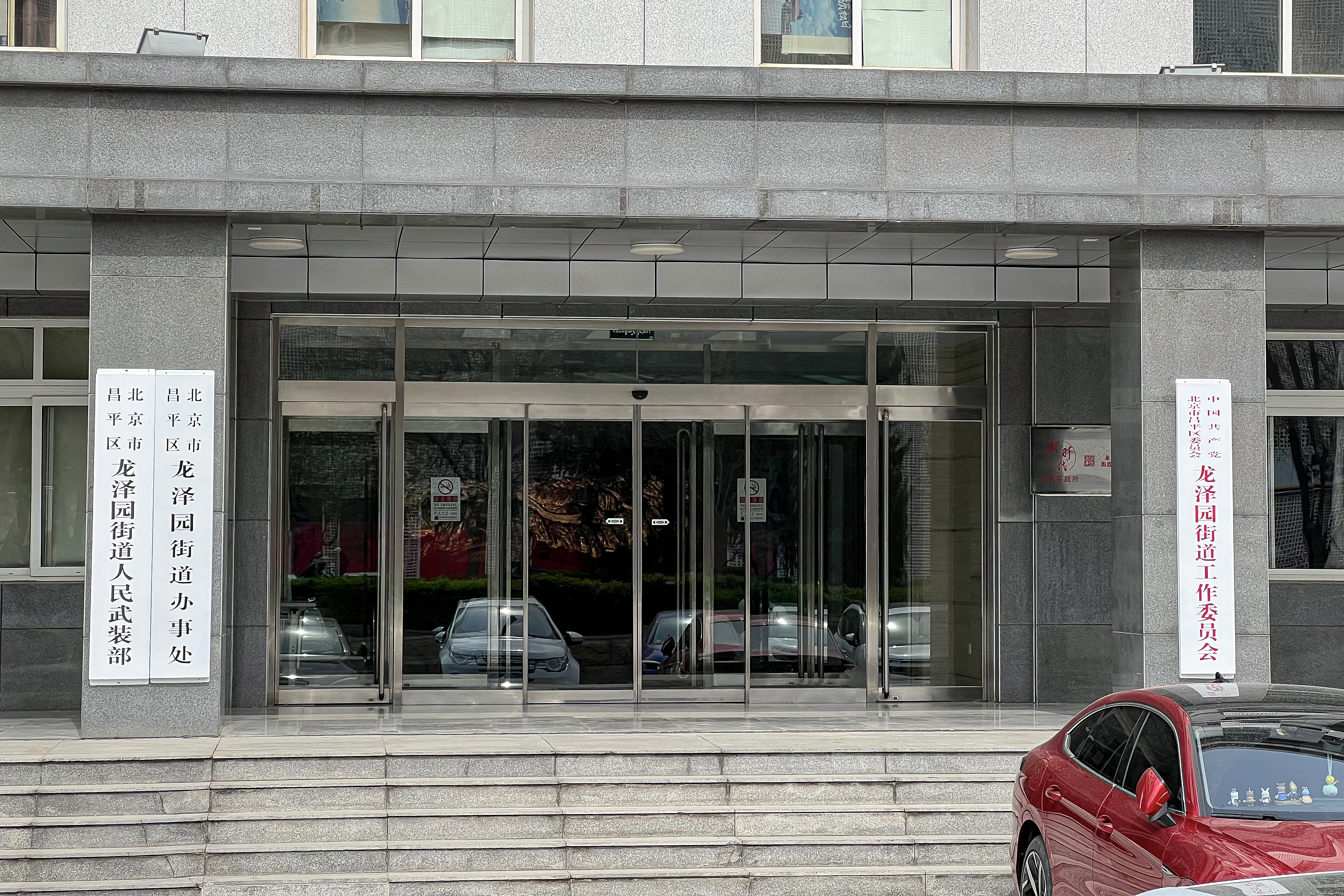
- Seat of Longzeyuan Subdistrict, 2025

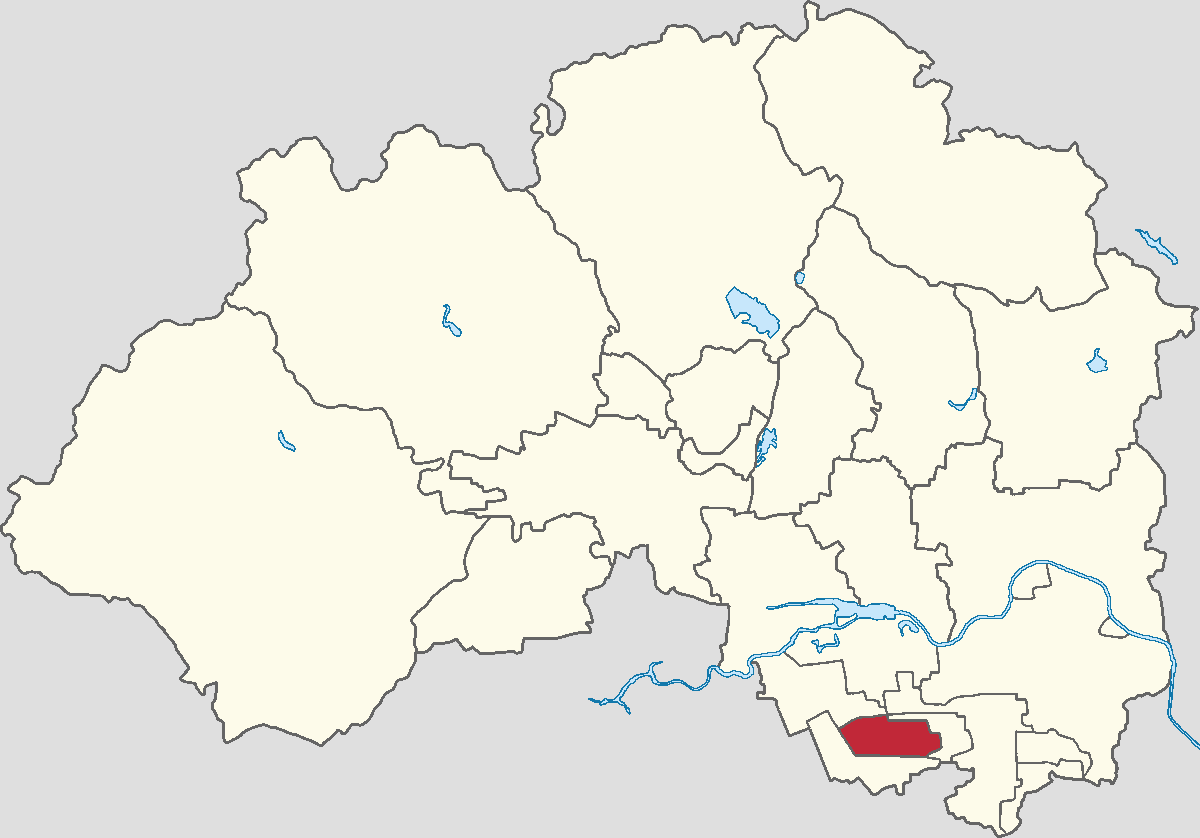
- Location of Longzeyuan Subdistrict within Changping District

- Location within Beijing Location within China
- Coordinates: 40°04′51″N 116°20′19″E
- Country: China
- Municipality: Beijing
- District: Changping
- Village-level Divisions: 34 communities 1 village

Area
  - Total: 12.79 km^{2} (4.94 sq mi)
- Elevation: 43 m (141 ft)

Population (2020)
  - Total: 181,906
  - Density: 14,220/km^{2} (36,840/sq mi)
- Time zone: UTC+8 (China Standard)
- Postal code: 102208
- Area code: 010

Longzeyuan Subdistrict (simplified Chinese: 龙泽园街道; traditional Chinese: 龍澤園街道; pinyin: Lóngzéyuán Jiēdào) is a subdistrict located on the southern side of Changping District, Beijing, China. It shares border with Shigezhuang and Huoying Subdistricts in the north, Huoying Subdistrict in the east, and Huilongguan Subdistrict in the south and west. Its population was 181,906 in the 2020 census.

== History ==
Timetable of Longzeyuan Subdistrict
Year	Status	Within
1983–1990	Huilongguan Township	Changping County
1990–1999	Huilongguan Town (Integrated Shigezhuang Township in 1999)	Changping County
1999–2004	Huilongguan Town (Integrated Shigezhuang Township in 1999)	Changping District
2004–2015	Huilongguan Area	Changping District
2015–present	Longzeyuan Subdistrict	Changping District

== Administrative divisions ==
As of 2021, Longzeyuan Subdistrict was composed of 35 subdivisions, with 34 of them being communities, and the other 1 being a village:

Administrative division code	Subdivision names	Name transliteration	Type
110114012001	佰嘉城	Baijiacheng	Community
110114012002	龙华园二区	Longhuayuan Erqu	Community
110114012003	龙华园	Longhuayuan	Community
110114012004	慧华苑	Huihuayuan	Community
110114012005	通达园	Tongdayuan	Community
110114012006	龙泽苑	Longzeyuan	Community
110114012007	龙泽苑东区	Longzeyuan Dongqu	Community
110114012008	龙腾苑二区	Longtengyuan Erqu	Community
110114012009	龙腾苑三区	Longtengyuan Sanqu	Community
110114012010	龙腾苑四区	Longtengyuan Siqu	Community
110114012011	龙腾苑五区	Longtengyuan Wuqu	Community
110114012012	龙腾苑六区	Longtengyuan Liuqu	Community
110114012013	云趣园	Yunquyuan	Community
110114012014	风雅园	Fengyayuan	Community
110114012015	龙禧苑	Longxiyuan	Community
110114012016	龙禧苑二区	Longxiyuan Erqu	Community
110114012017	龙锦苑二区	Longjinyuan Erqu	Community
110114012018	龙锦苑四区	Longjinyuan Siqu	Community
110114012019	龙锦苑五区	Longjinyuan Wuqu	Community
110114012020	龙锦苑六区	Longjinyuan Liuqu	Community
110114012021	龙跃苑一区	Longyueyuan Yiqu	Community
110114012022	龙跃苑二区	Longyueyuan Erqu	Community
110114012023	龙跃苑三区	Longyueyuan Sanqu	Community
110114012024	龙跃苑四区	Longyueyuan Siqu	Community
110114012025	龙跃苑东二区	Longyueyuandong Erqu	Community
110114012026	龙跃苑东四五	Longyueyuandong Siwu	Community
110114012027	北郊农场	Beijiao Nongchang	Community
110114012028	天龙苑	Tianlongyuan	Community
110114012029	北店嘉园	Beidian Jiayuan	Community
110114012030	良庄家园	Liangzhuang Jiayuan	Community
110114012031	智慧社	Zhihuishe	Community
110114012032	国仕汇	Guoshihui	Community
110114012033	国风美唐	Guofeng Meitang	Community
110114012034	天露园	Tianluyuan	Community
110114012201	三合庄	Sanhezhuang	Village

== See also ==
- List of township-level divisions of Beijing
