= Huoying Subdistrict =

Huoying Subdistrict 霍营街道
- Subdistrict
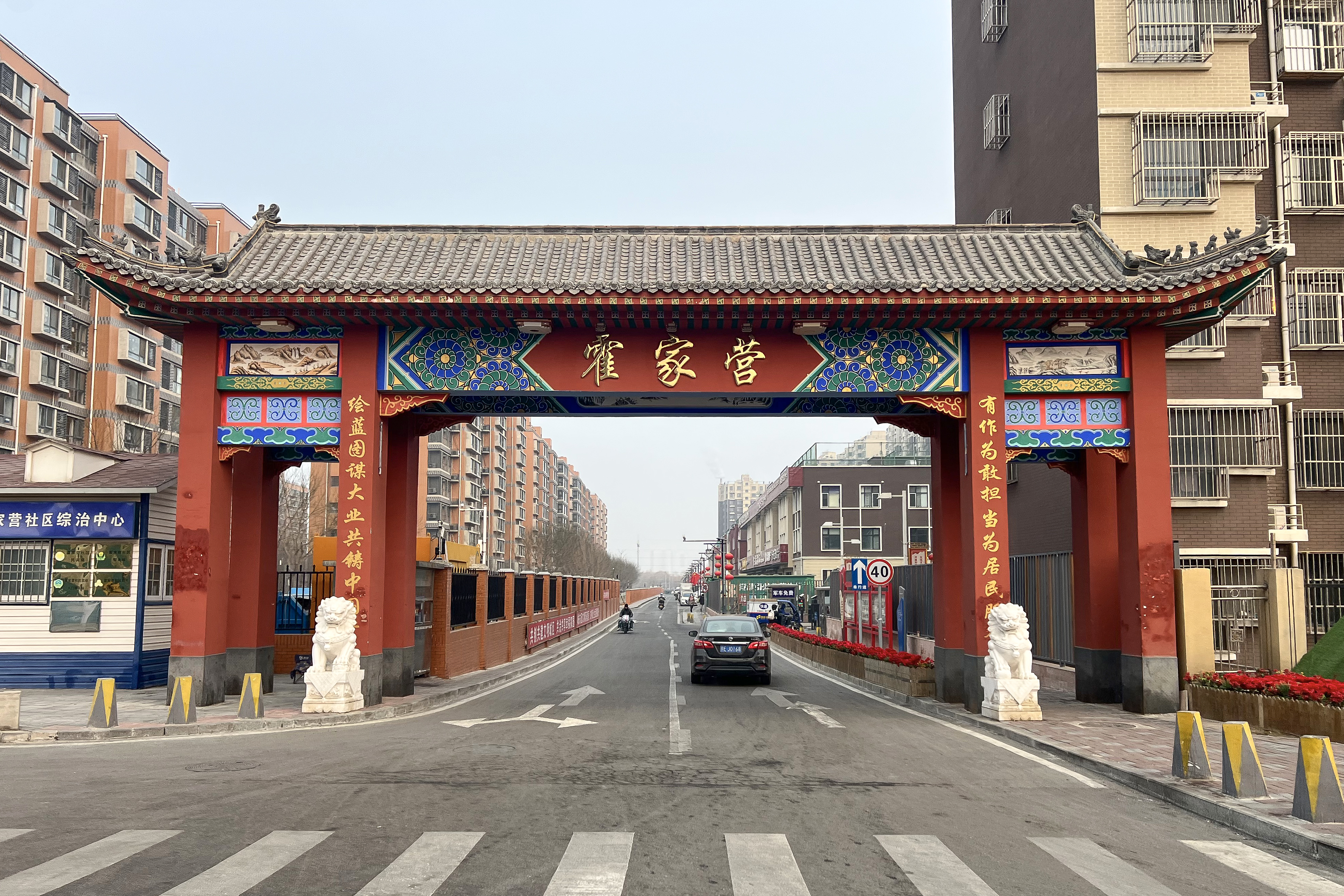
- Huojiaying community, 2024

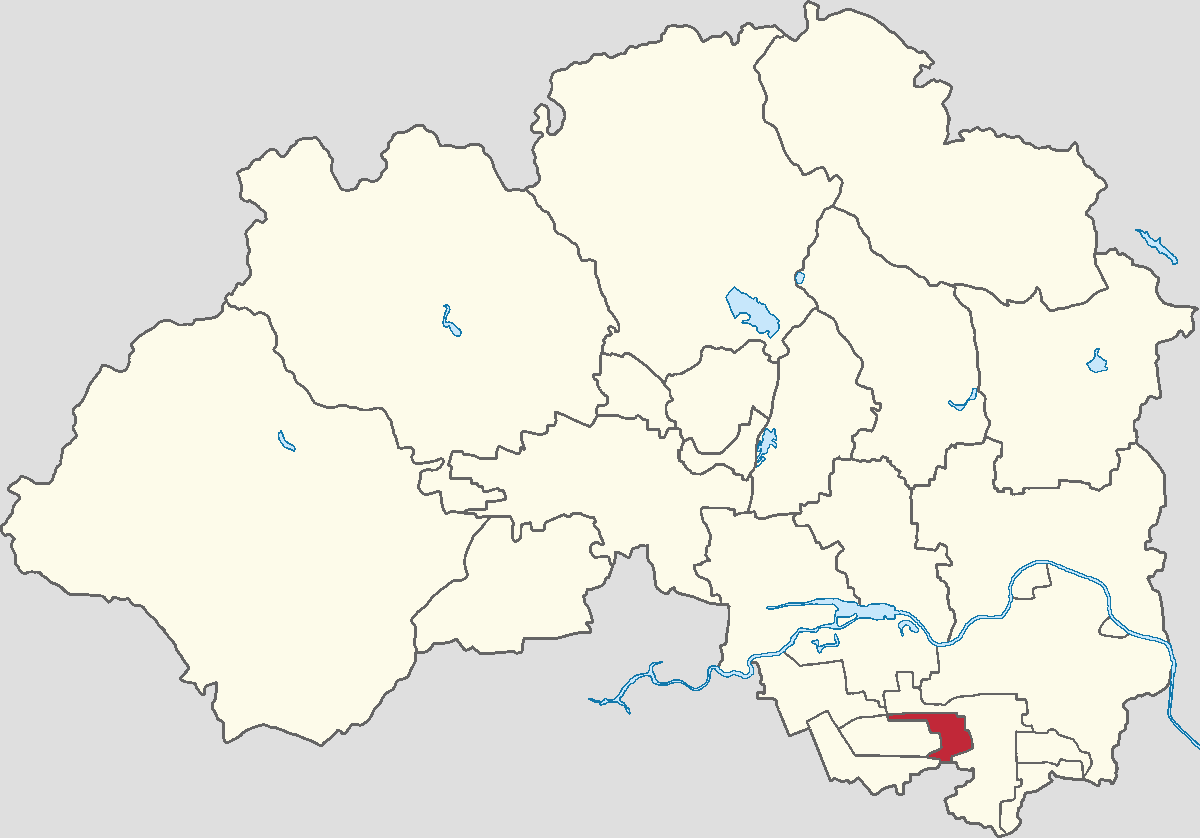
- Location of Huoying Subdistrict within Changping District

- Location within Beijing Location within China
- Coordinates: 40°05′01″N 116°21′27″E
- Country: China
- Municipality: Beijing
- District: Changping
- Village-level Divisions: 19 communities

Area
  - Total: 4.37 km^{2} (1.69 sq mi)
- Elevation: 43 m (141 ft)

Population (2020)
  - Total: 93,545
  - Density: 21,400/km^{2} (55,400/sq mi)
- Time zone: UTC+8 (China Standard)
- Postal code: 102208
- Area code: 010

Huoying Subdistrict (simplified Chinese: 霍营街道; traditional Chinese: 霍營街道; pinyin: Huòyíng Jiēdào) is a subdistrict situated within Changping District, Beijing, China. It shares border with Dongxiaokou Town in the north and east, Xisanqi and Huilongguan Subdistricts in the south, and Longzeyuan Subdistrict in the west. According to the result of 2020 Chinese census, the subdistrict's population was 93,545.

This region was once called Huoshaoying (Chinese: 火烧营; lit. 'Fire Burning Camp') Village during the Qing dynasty. As the number of people with the surname Huo increased, it was later changed to Huoying.

== History ==
History of Huoying Subdistrict
Year	Status	Part of
1949–1958	Huoying Township	Changping County
1958–1960	Part of Hongqi People's Commune	Changping County
1960–1983	Shahe People's Commune	Changping County
1983–1999	Huoying Township	Changping County
1999–2012	Part of Dongxiaokou Town (Area)	Changping District
2012–present	Huoying Subdistrict	Changping District

== Administrative divisions ==
In 2021, the following 19 communities constituted Huoying Subdistrict:

Administrative division code	Subdivision names	Name transliteration
110114010001	华龙苑南里	Hualongyuan Nanli
110114010002	华龙苑北里	Hualongyuan Beili
110114010003	蓝天园	Lantianyuan
110114010004	天鑫家园	Tianxin Jiayuan
110114010005	霍营小区	Huoying Xiaoqu
110114010006	上坡佳园	Shangpo Jiayuan
110114010007	华龙苑中里	Hualongyuan Zhongli
110114010008	流星花园	Liuxing Huayuan
110114010009	龙回苑	Longhuiyuan
110114010010	和谐家园	Hexie Jiayuan
110114010011	田园风光雅苑	Tianyuan Fengguang Yayuan
110114010012	龙锦苑一区	Longjinyuan Yiqu
110114010013	龙锦苑东一区	Longjinyuandong Yiqu
110114010014	龙锦苑东二区	Longjinyuandong Erqu
110114010015	龙锦苑东五区	Longjinyuandong Wuqu
110114010016	龙锦苑东三区	Longjinyuandong Sanqu
110114010017	龙锦苑东四区	Longjinyuandong Siqu
110114010018	紫金新干线	Zijin Xinganxian
110114010019	霍家营	Huojiaying

== See also ==
- List of township-level divisions of Beijing
