= QHE =

QHE may refer to:

- Quantum Hall effect, a quantized version of the Hall effect
- QHE, the Pinyin code for Qinghe railway station, Haidian District, Beijing
