= Qinghe railway station =

Railway station in Beijing, China

Coordinates: 40°02′19″N 116°18′36″E

Qinghe 清河
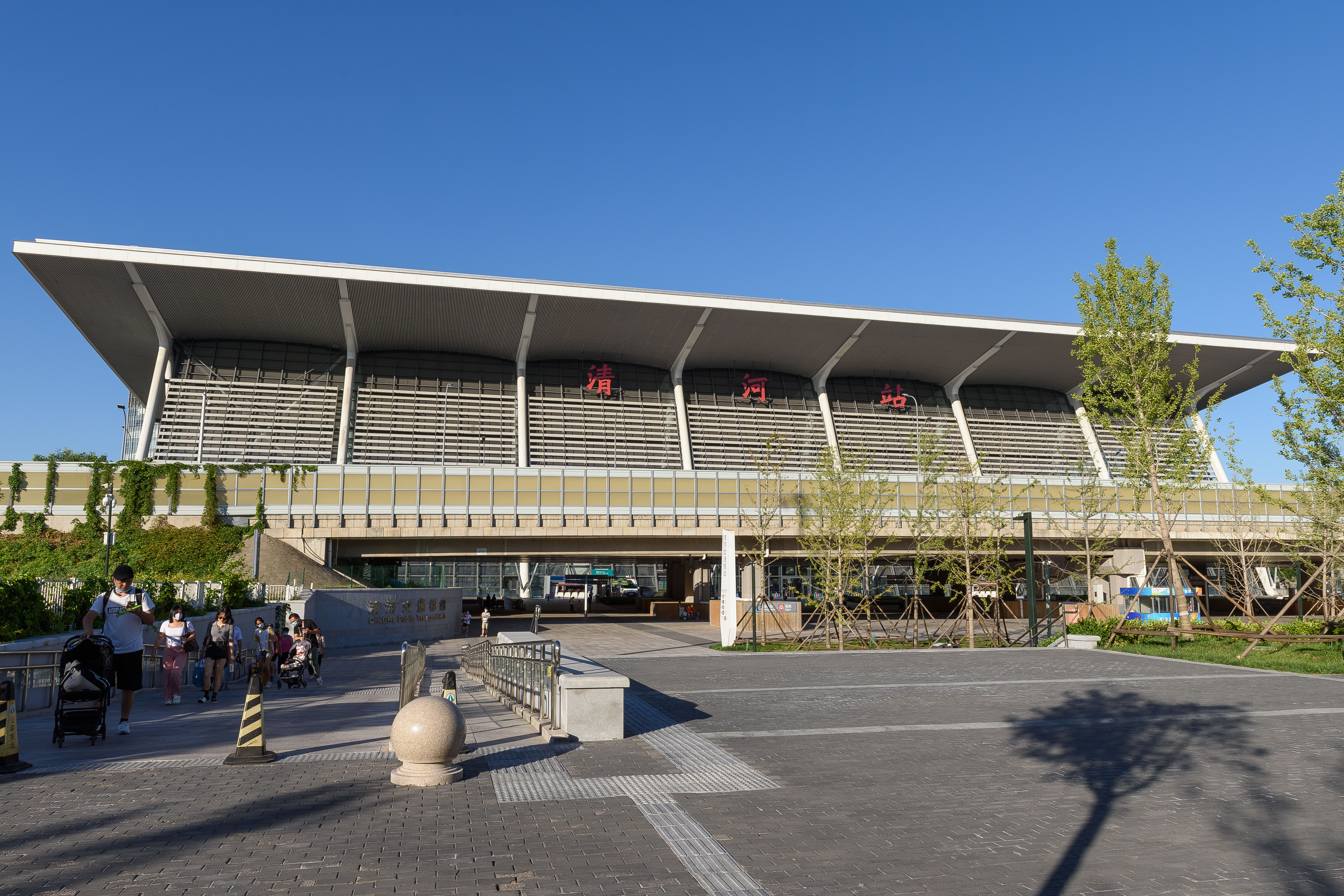
- New Qinghe railway station in July 2022

General information
- Location: Qinghe Subdistrict, Haidian District, Beijing
- Operated by: Tongzhou Train Operation Depot, China Railway Beijing Group; Beijing Subway
- Lines: China Railway: Beijing–Baotou PDL; Beijing Suburban Railway: Huairou–Miyun line; Beijing Subway: Line 13; Changping line; Line 19 (branch line, under planning)
- Platforms: 4 island platforms (China Railway); 1 island platform (Line 13 of Beijing Subway)

Construction
- Structure type: Elevated (railway)

Other information
- Station code: 12707 (TMIS); QIP (telegram); QHE (pinyin)

History
- Opened: 1906; 120 years ago (old railway station); December 30, 2019; 6 years ago (new railway station & Line 13 of Beijing Subway); December 31, 2021; 4 years ago (Changping line of Beijing Subway)
- Closed: 31 October 2016; 9 years ago (old railway station)

Passengers
- 16 million per year (estimated)

Services
Preceding station	China Railway	Following station
Beijing North Terminus	Beijing–Zhangjiakou intercity railway	Shahe towards Zhangjiakou, Yanqing or Taizicheng
Preceding station	Beijing Suburban Railway	Following station
Beijing North Terminus	Huairou–Miyun line	Changping North towards Gubeikou
Location

Qinghe railway station (Chinese: 清河站; pinyin: Qīnghé zhàn) is a railway station in Beijing. The old station's construction began in 1905 and opened in 1906. The station closed on October 31, 2016, to be rebuilt into a new high-speed railway station on the Beijing-Baotou Passenger-Dedicated Line opened on December 30, 2019.

The new station occupies an area of 146,000 m^{2} (1,570,000 sq ft), and the waiting hall is nearly 23,000 m^{2} (250,000 sq ft). It has four island platforms and eight railway lines, including two main lines (screen doors are set on the main line platforms). The station together with Beijing North railway station is the terminal of Beijing–Zhangjiakou intercity railway, which was the vital supporting infrastructure of the 2022 Winter Olympics.

== History ==
The old Qinghe railway station was a third-class station positioned 20km from the start of the Beijing-Zhangjiakou Railway. The station began construction in 1905 and was completed in 1906. The building was a single-floor, wood and brick construction, the floor area was 336 square meters and combined both Chinese and western architecture styles.

On September 8, 1912, the first president of the Provisional Government of the Republic of China Dr. Sun Yat-Sen stopped at the station for inspection. After 1949, the station experienced renovations and expansions that resulted in the original central station name plaque and parapet being destroyed, however the main building section remain unchanged. The changes included the addition of a prefab waiting room independent of the main building, resulting in the function of the original building being reduced to the ticketing office and other logistical functions. Additionally the exterior walls of the old station building were painted over several times, covering the original vertical exterior name plaques bearing the name of the station.

To make space for the construction of the new Qinghe railway station, the old station building closed in 2016, following 110 years of operation. In October 2017, a structural relocation effort began in order to preserve the historical building. The relocation work was done in three stages, covered 360 meters and was completed in 2019.

After the building was relocated to the southeast corner of the new station, restoration work began. The restoration included removal of paint to reveal the original brick walls, replacement of roof tiles, strengthening or replacement of wooden structures, floor refurbishment, replacement of doors and windows, and the reconstruction of the parapet and central name plaque (central name plaque left blank).

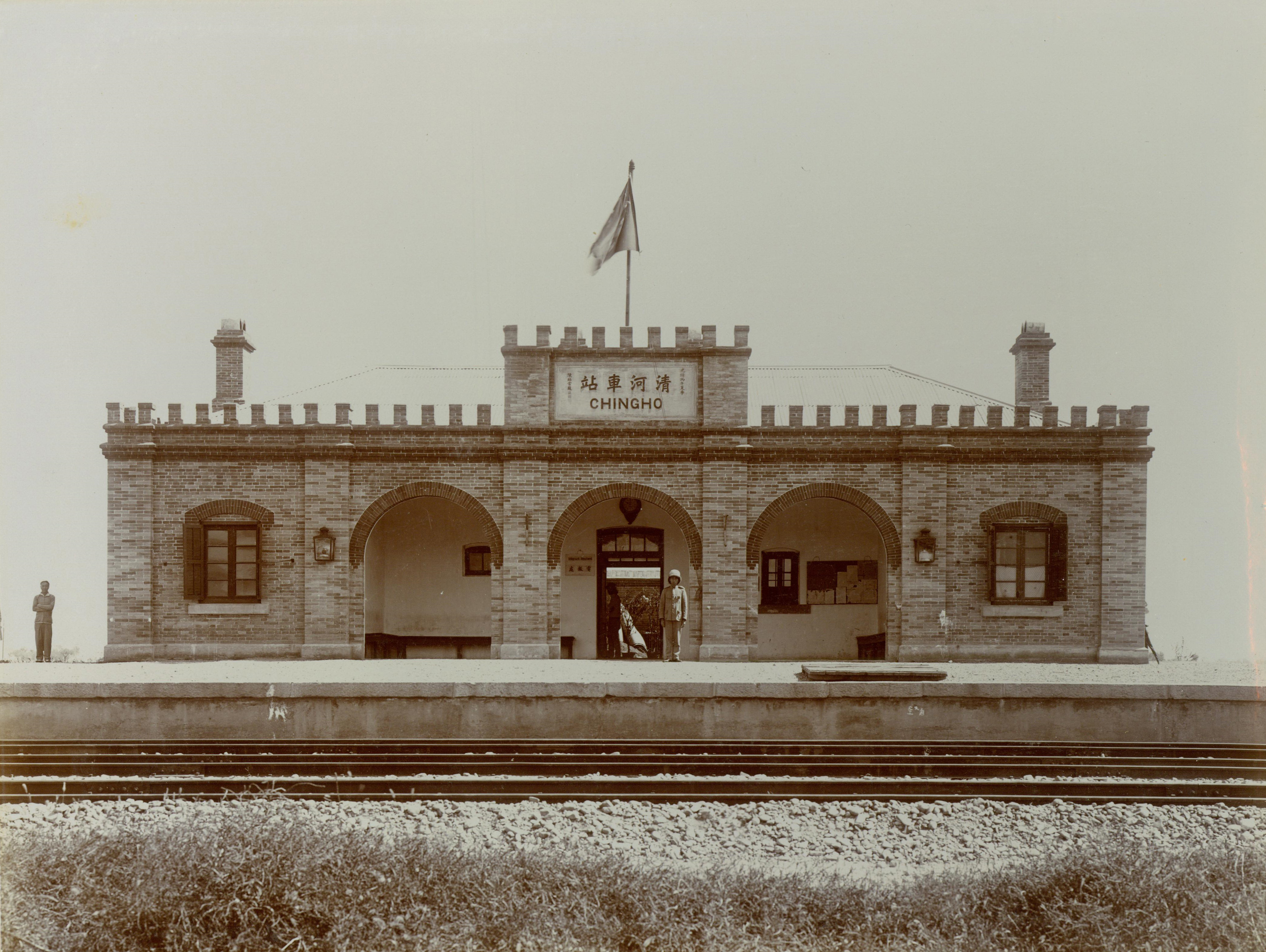
Qinghe railway station in 1909

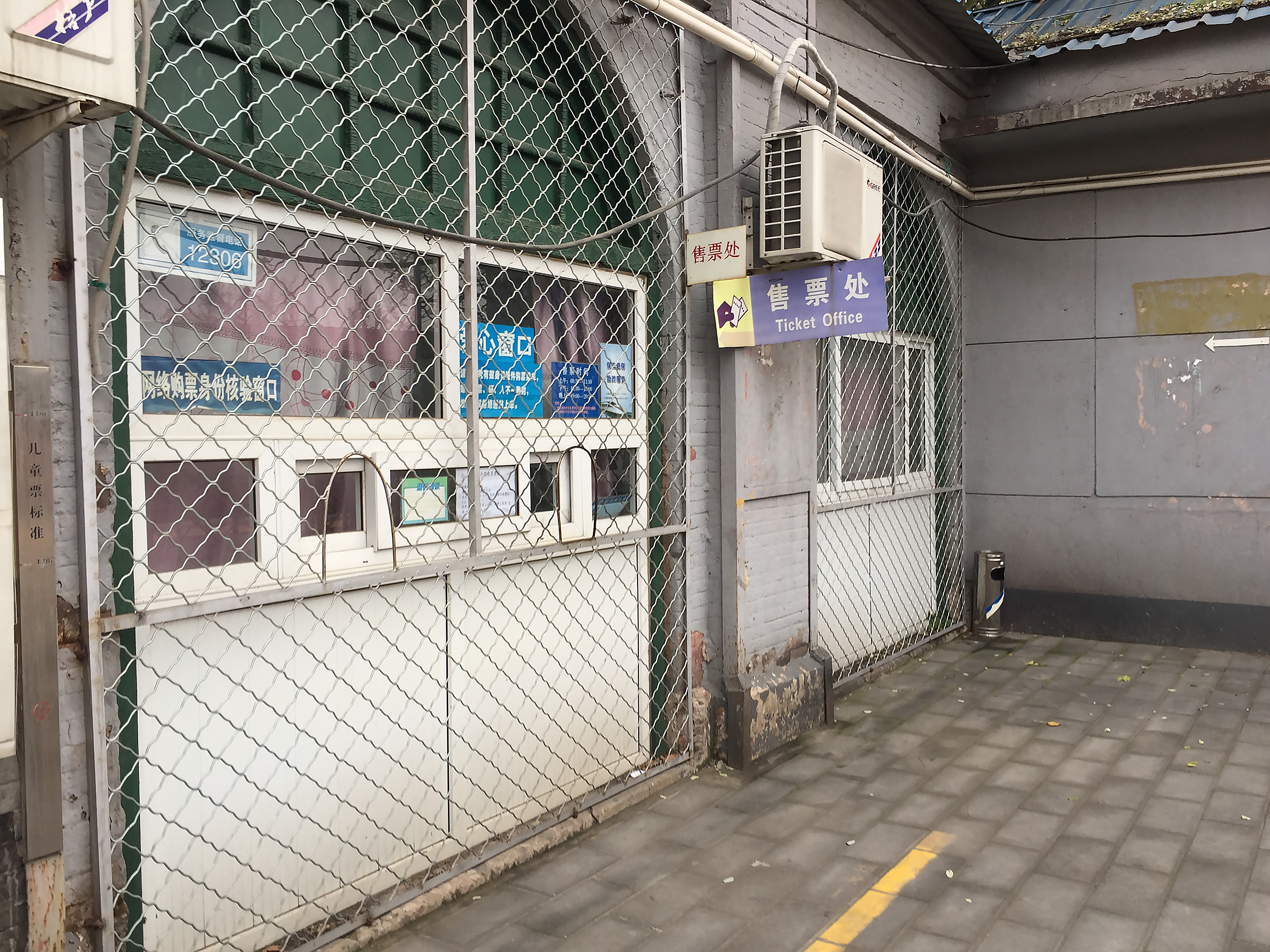
Original building functioning as ticket office

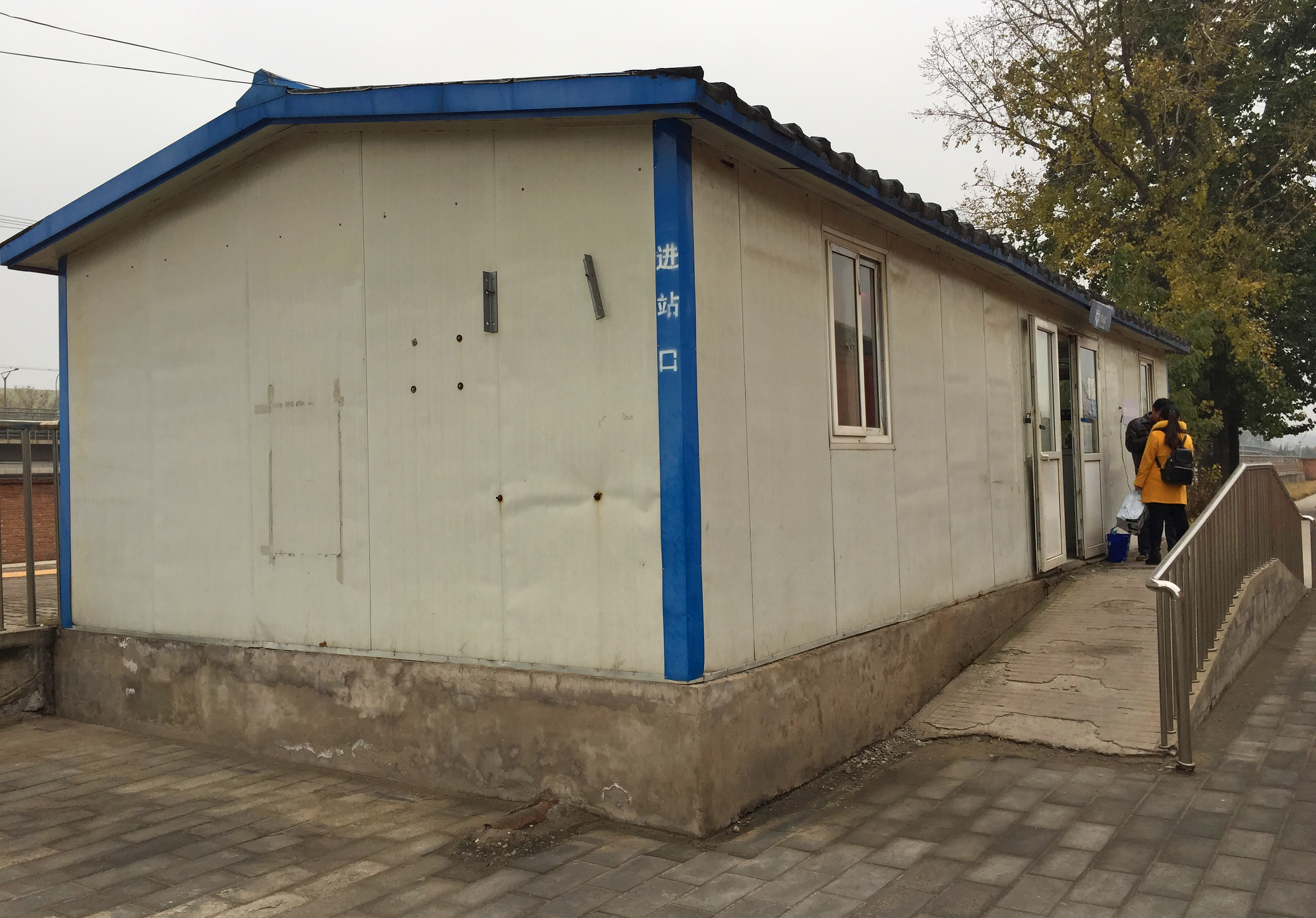
Prefabricated waiting room

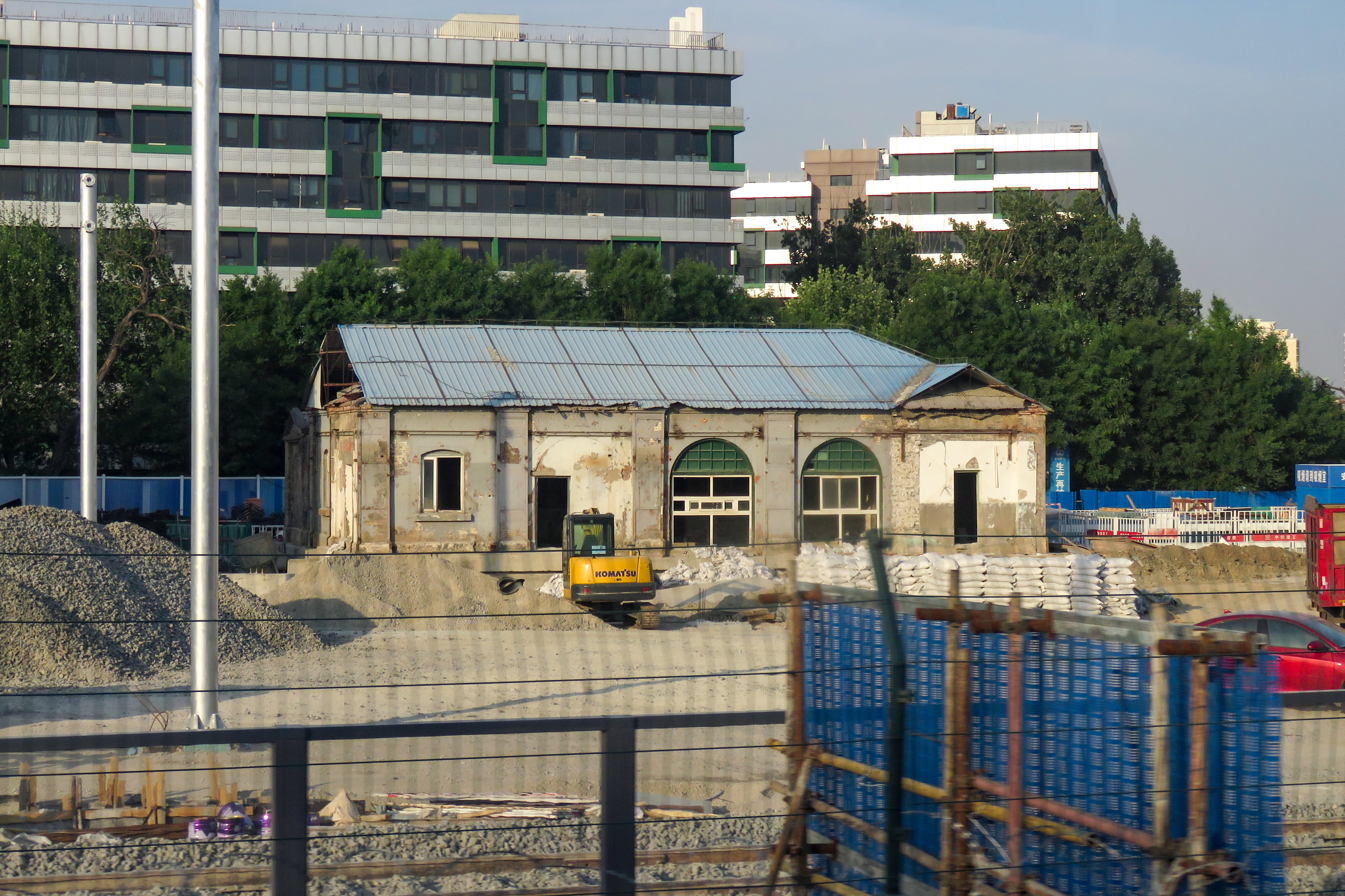
Old station building soon after relocation

== Design ==
AREP collaborated with China Railway Engineering Consulting Group designed this station in 2016. The overall design philosophy is to blend the ancient and the modern, and the sea refuses no rivers. The curved roof and overhang eave represent the ancient style. The angled bents supporting frame and the simple and powerful geometric shape are full of modern technology.

Many cultural elements are used in the station. On the roof, seven west-to-east sloping ridges are like seven ski runs. Equipment rooms in the waiting hall are decorated with mural reflecting the geographical and cultural features of Beijing.

== Structure ==
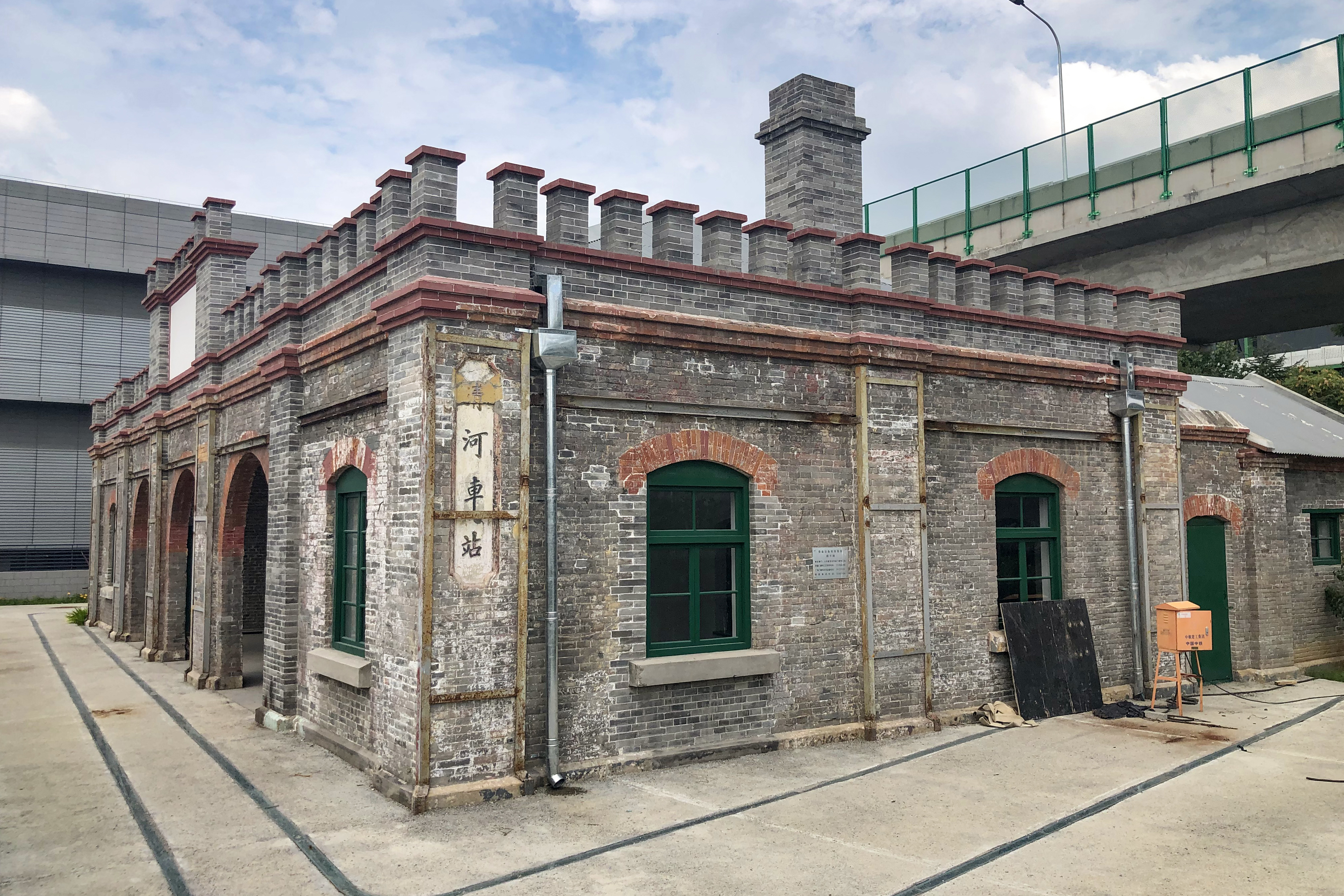
Old station building built in 1906, preserved on the southeast of the current station

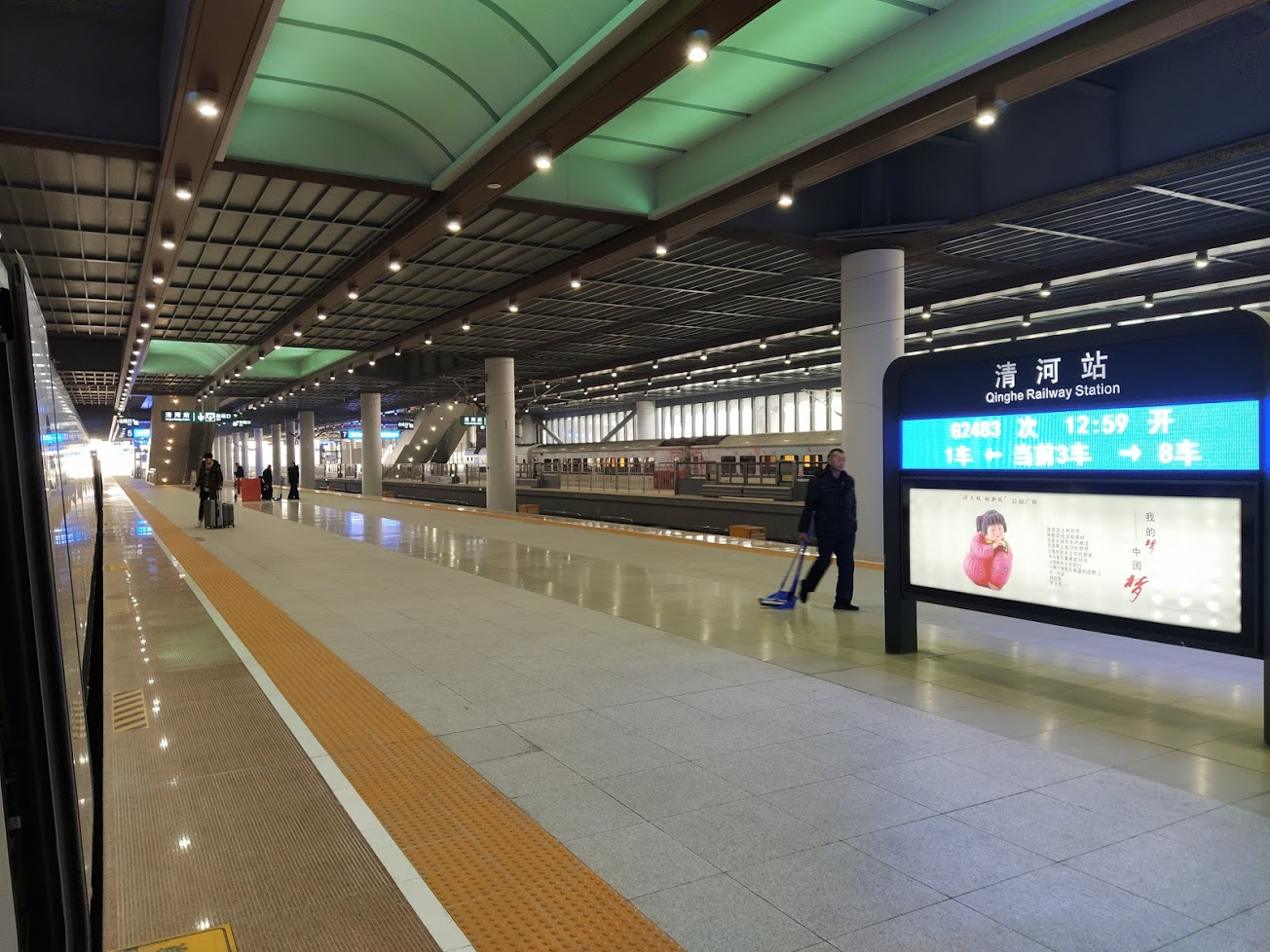
Platform of Qinghe Railway Station for the Beijing-Zhangjiakou intercity railway

The station has total five floors, three overground and two underground.

B2 floor is the subway platform floor for Changping line and Line 19 branch line.

B1 floor is the transfer floor, on which are the railway exits 1-2 and underground railway entrance, railway integrated service center 1, railway automatic ticketing areas 1–2, the Suburban Railway entrance and exit, the subway hall (subway entrance, exit and service center), parking area, passageway to East and West Plaza.

As a feature of this station, the security checks of different transportation are recognized. Passengers do not need to take repetitive security checks during transfer among subway, railway and suburban railway.

F1 (Ground Floor) is the railway platform floor with east and west plazas. East Plaza links to Anningzhuang 2nd West Tiao Road and north public transportation hubs (PTH). West Plaza has railway entrance 1, railway automatic ticketing area 3–4, west PTH, taxi stand, and links to Shangdi East Road.

F2 is the railway waiting hall floor with north and south elevated drop-off platforms. In the waiting hall, there are check-in gate 1-8A/B, 12306 service center, and four characteristic waiting areas (military waiting area, children playing area, business travel leisure area, and multi-function service area). On the north drop-off platform, there are drop-off area, railway entrance 3, railway integrated service center 3, railway automatic ticketing area 6, and business waiting room 2, and links to Anningzhuang North Road. On the south drop-off platform, there are drop-off area, railway entrance 2, railway integrated service center 2, railway automatic ticketing area 5, business waiting room 1, and links to G7.

F3 is the shopping floor. Some specialty shops and restaurants are on F3.

== Beijing Subway ==
Qinghe Railway Station 清河站
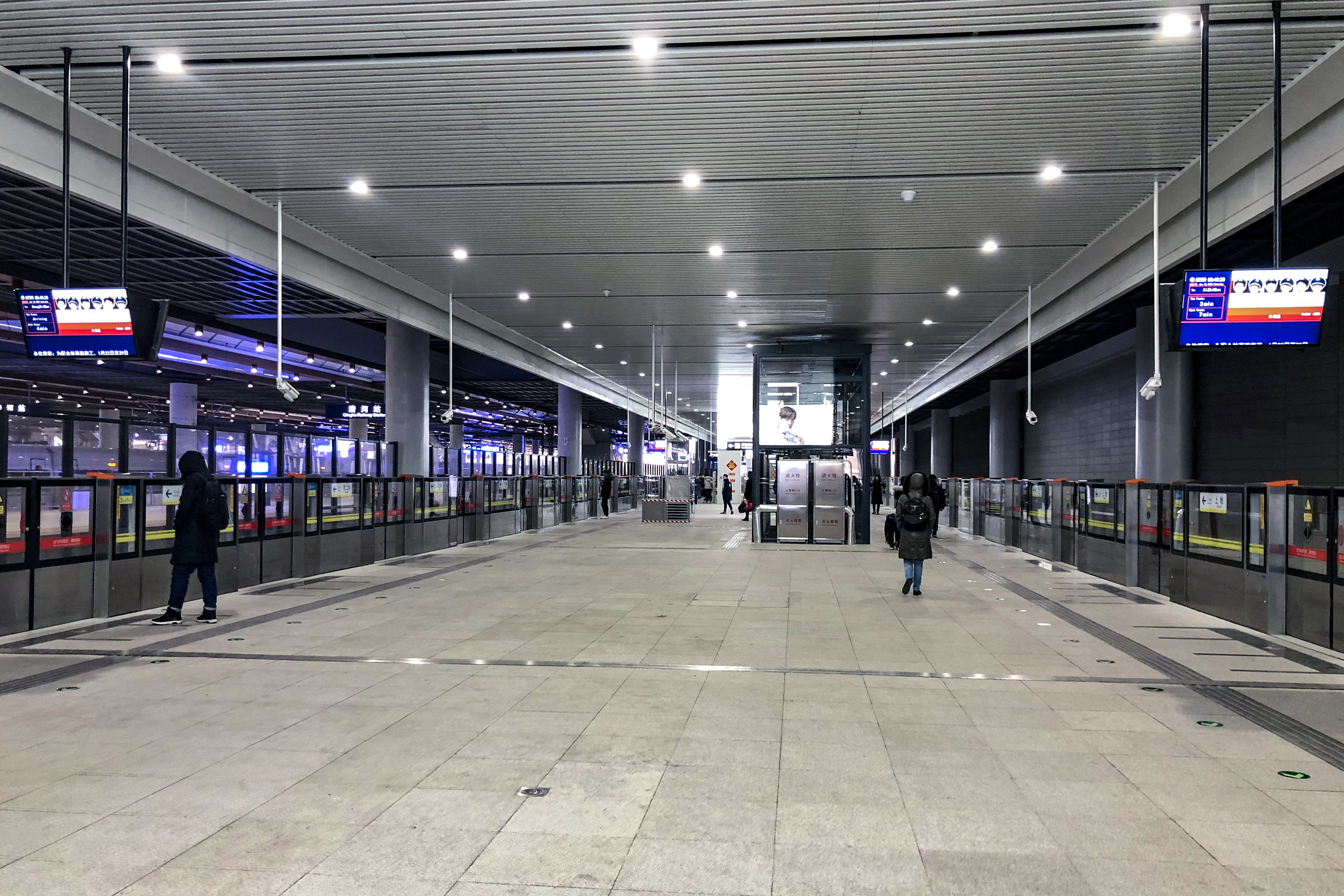
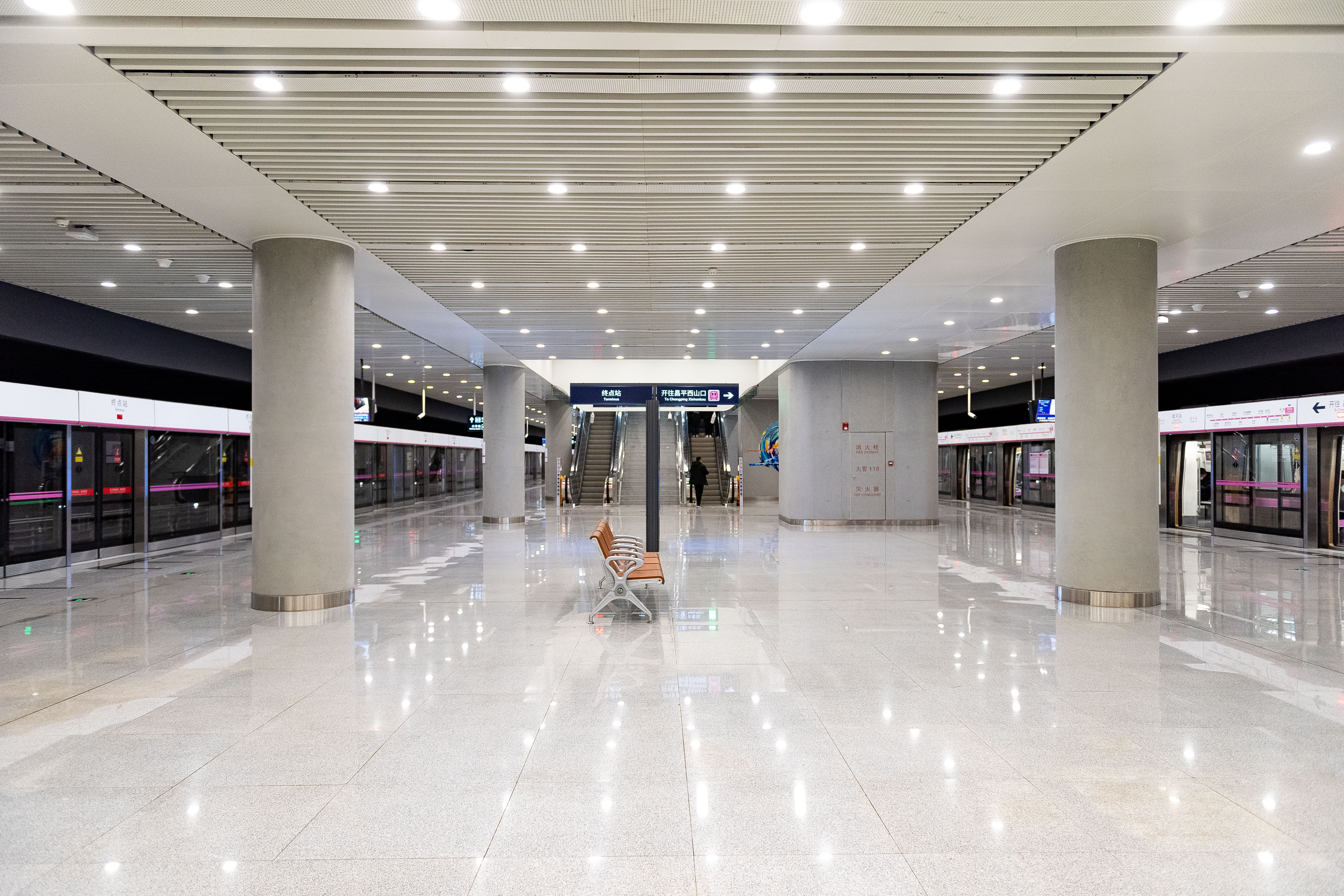
- Line 13 platform in 2020 Changping line platform in 2022

General information
- Location: Qinghe Subdistrict, Haidian District, Beijing; China
- Operated by: Beijing Mass Transit Railway Operation Corp., Ltd.
- Lines: Line 13; Changping line Line 19 (branch line, under planning)
- Platforms: Line 13: 2 (1 island platform); Changping line: 2 (1 island platform)
- Tracks: 4

Construction
- Structure type: At-grade (Line 13); Underground (Changping line & Line 19)
- Accessible: Yes

History
- Opened: December 30, 2019; 6 years ago (Line 13); December 31, 2021; 4 years ago (Changping line)

Services
Preceding station	Beijing Subway	Following station
Shangdi towards Xizhimen	Line 13	Xi'erqi towards Dongzhimen
Xi'erqi towards Changping Xishankou	Changping line	Zhufangbei towards Jimen Qiao
Location

An infill station on Line 13 of Beijing Subway opened on December 30, 2019. The station for Line 13 is at-grade.

The station on Changping line of Beijing Subway opened on December 31, 2021. The station for Changping line is underground. It was the southern terminus of the line until the extension to Xitucheng opened on February 4, 2023.

The branch line of the north extension of Line 19 will stop there as well. The station for Line 19 (branch) is underground.

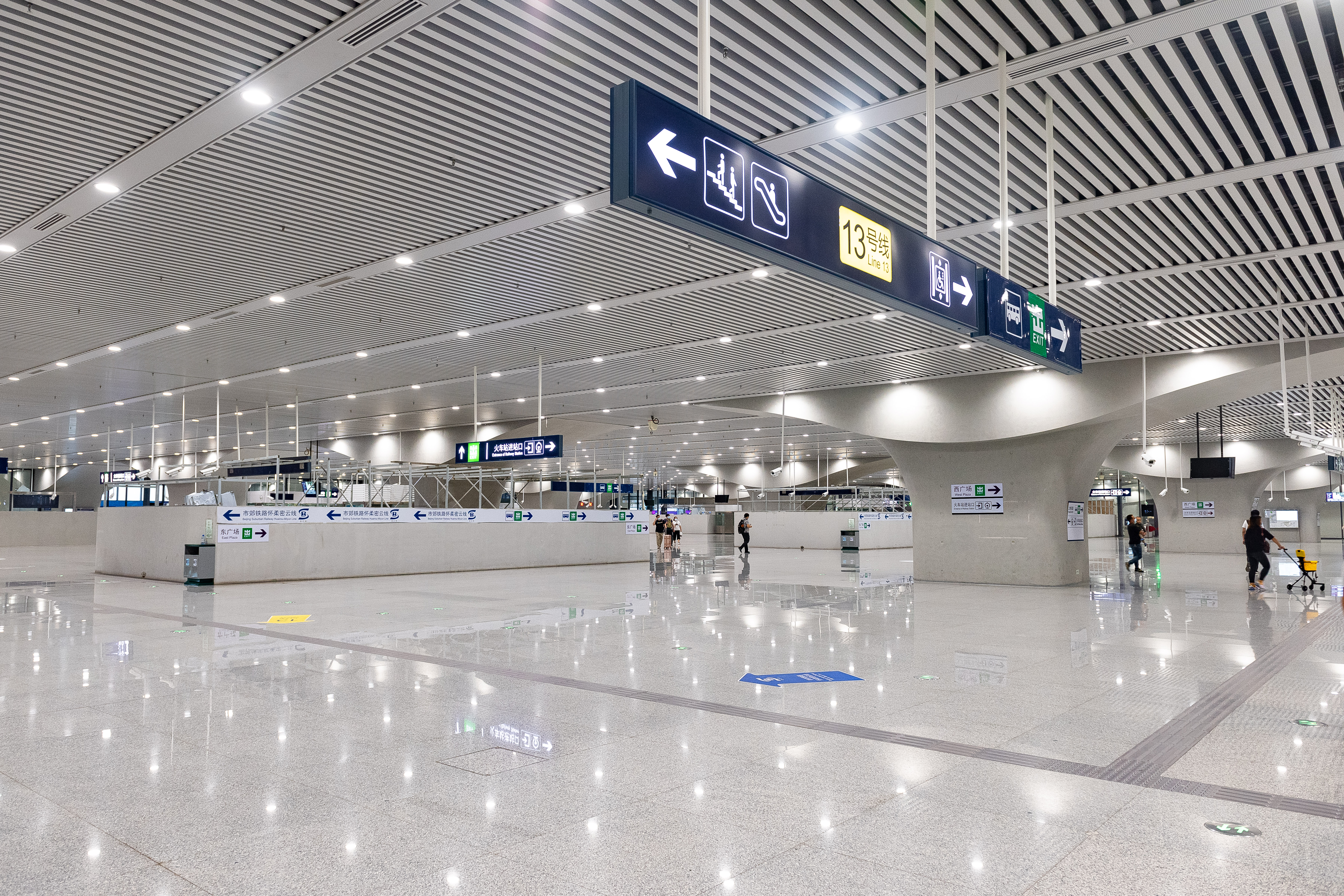
Concourse in 2021

== See also ==
- Qinghe Subdistrict, Beijing
- Beijing North railway station
