= Xi'erqi station =

Beijing Subway interchange station

Xi'erqi 西二旗
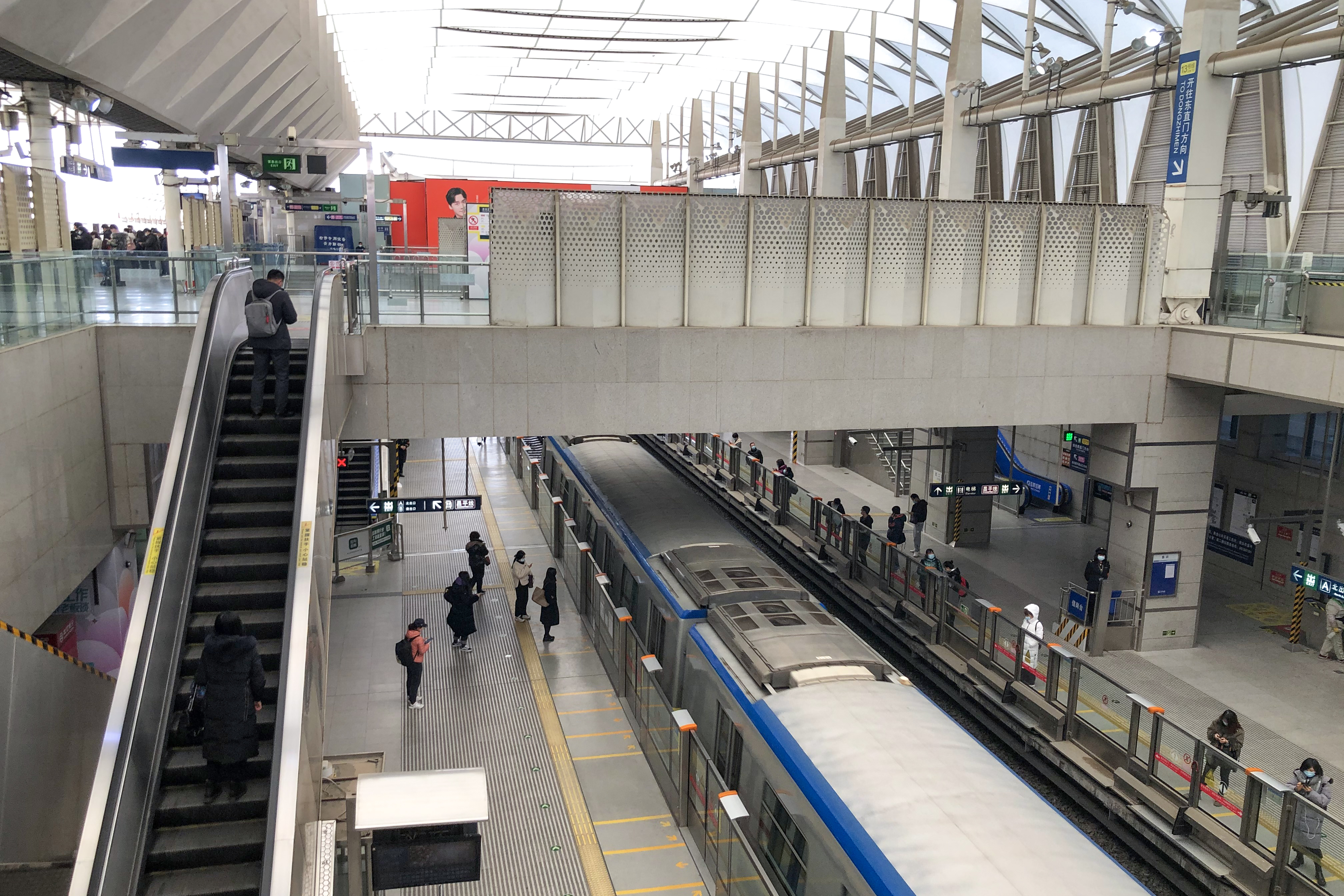
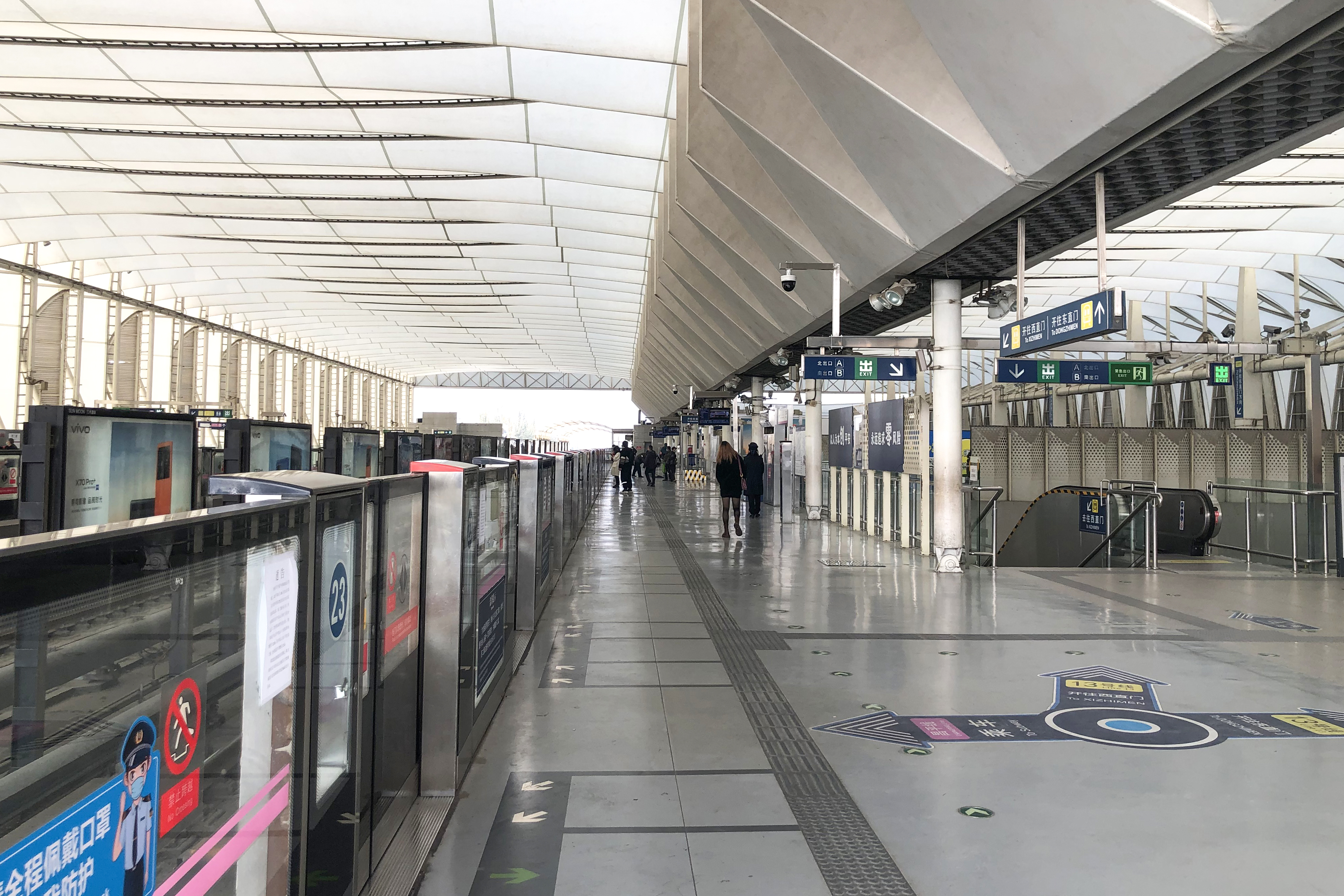
- Line 13 platform from Changping line level Changping line northbound platform in 2021

General information
- Location: Haidian District, Beijing; China
- Coordinates: 40°03′11″N 116°18′23″E
- Operator: Beijing Mass Transit Railway Operation Corporation Limited
- Lines: Line 13; Changping line; Line 18 (2027)
- Platforms: 4 (4 side platforms)
- Tracks: 4

Construction
- Structure type: At-grade (Line 13); Elevated (Changping line)
- Accessible: Yes

Other information
- Station code: 1306 (Line 13)

History
- Opened: September 28, 2002; 23 years ago (Old station, Line 13); December 25, 2010; 15 years ago (New station, Line 13); December 30, 2010; 15 years ago (Changping line)
- Closed: December 25, 2010; 15 years ago (Old station, Line 13)

Services
Preceding station	Beijing Subway	Following station
Qinghe railway station towards Xizhimen	Line 13	Longze towards Dongzhimen
Life Science Park towards Changping Xishankou	Changping line	Qinghe railway station towards Jimen Qiao
Future services
Qinghe railway station towards Malianwa	Line 18 Opening 2027	Longzexi towards Tiantongyuandong
Location
- Location within Beijing

Xi'erqi station (Chinese: 西二旗站; pinyin: Xī'èrqí zhàn) is an interchange station between Line 13 and the Changping Line on the Beijing Subway. The station relocated to a new location several hundred meters north on December 25, 2010, to ease transfers between the two lines when the new Changping Line opened, and the original station was then defunct, but was not demolished until August 2020. The new building, with a light membrane white covering, was designed by Atelier Li Xinggang. The station is extremely congested with 13,000 people per hour transferring between the station's two lines during peak periods. A viral video filmed at this station showing rush hour crowds attempting to board the overcrowded trains was posted on YouTube in 2013. This congestion during peak hours was eased after the Qinghe railway station expansion in 2021, due to its close proximity to Xi'erqi, distributing some of the passenger traffic in the area.

The station was the southern terminus of Changping Line until Qinghe railway station opened on December 31, 2021.

== Station layout ==
Both the line 13 and Changping line stations have 2 side platforms. The line 13 platforms are on ground level, while the Changping line platforms are elevated, which means that the Changping line platforms are above the line 13 platforms.

== Exits ==
There are 5 exits, lettered A1, A2, B1, B2, and B3. Exits A1 and B3 are accessible.

== Gallery ==
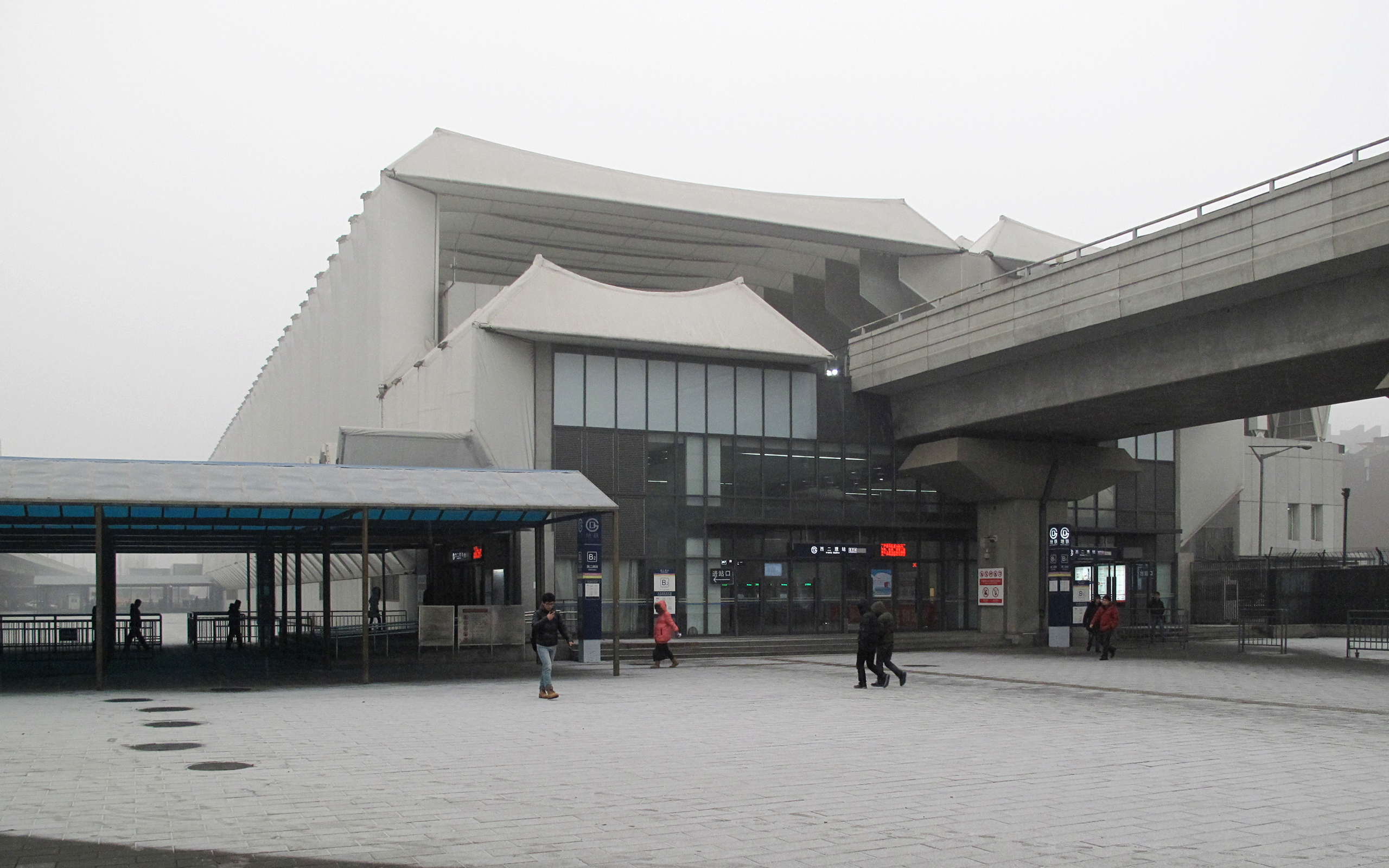
New station exterior

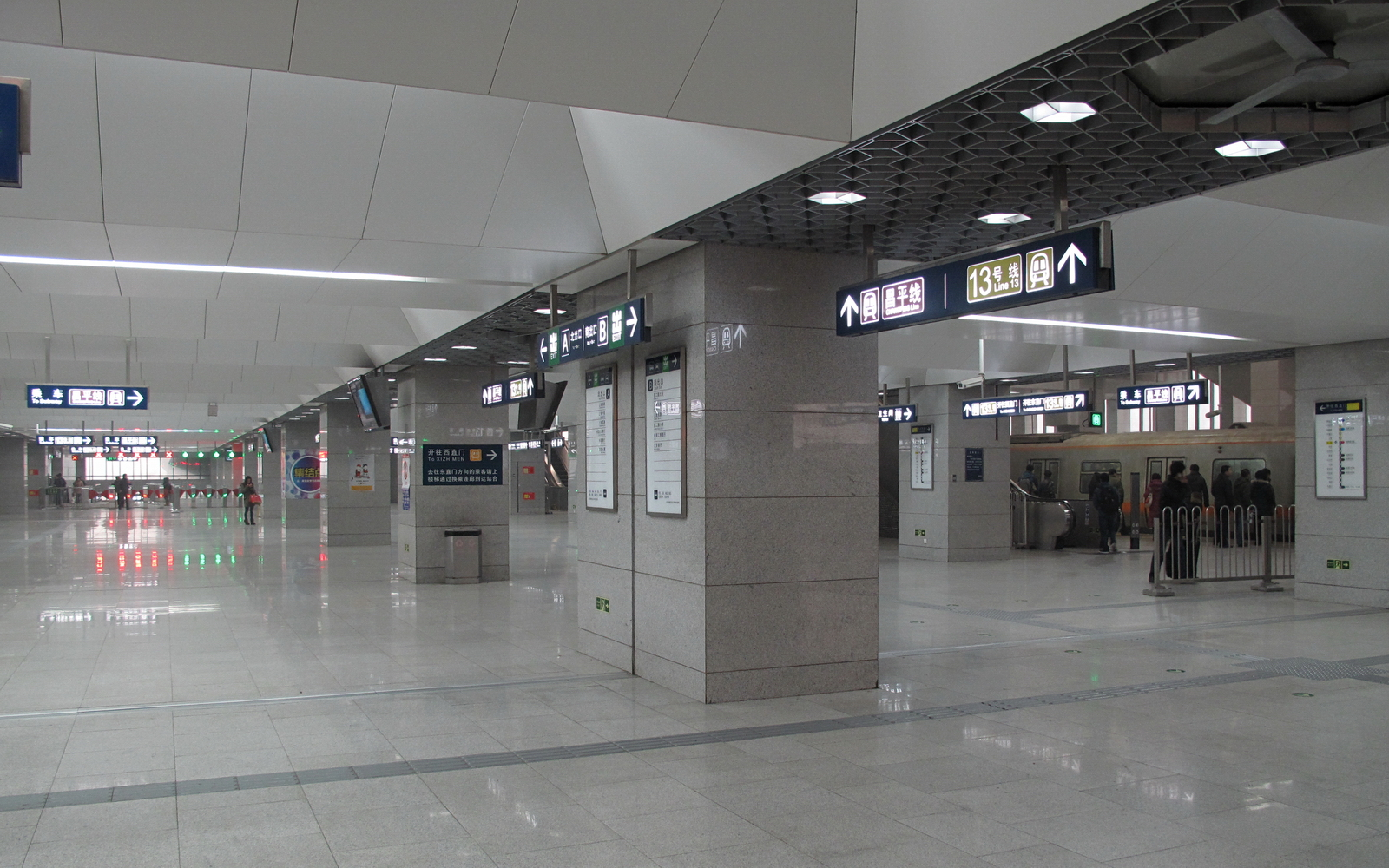
New station concourse (January 2013)

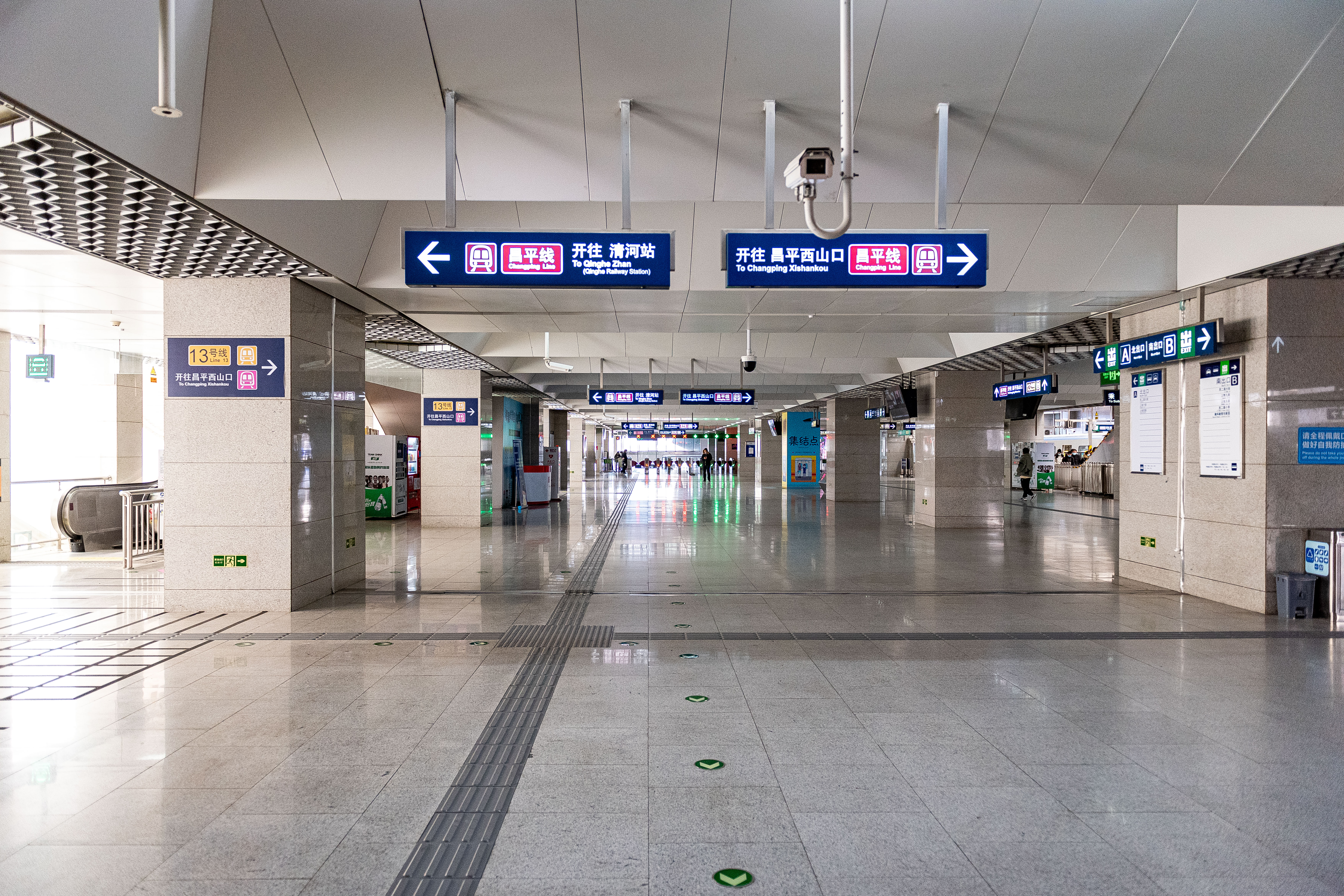
New station concourse (January 2022)

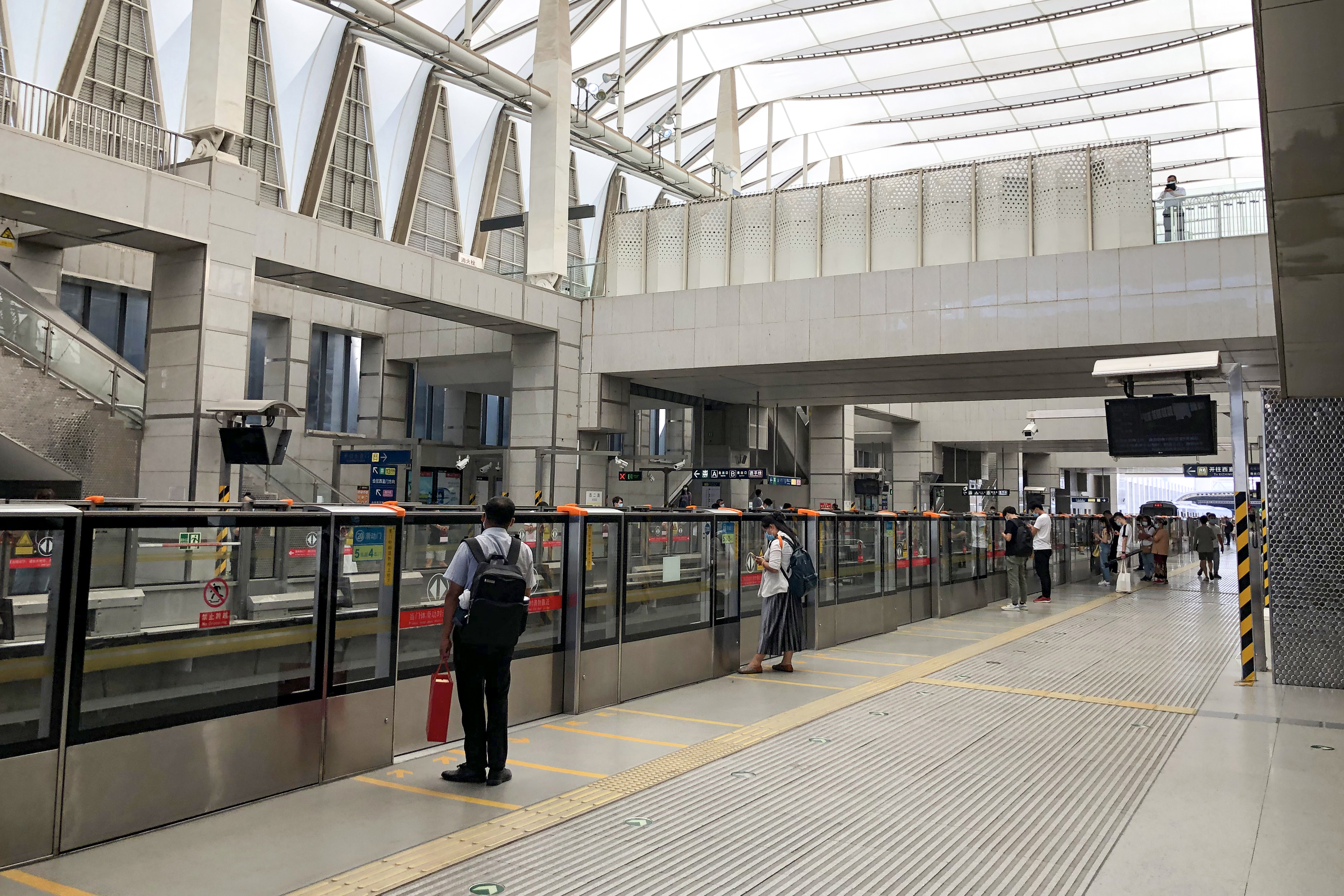
Line 13 platform (September 2020)

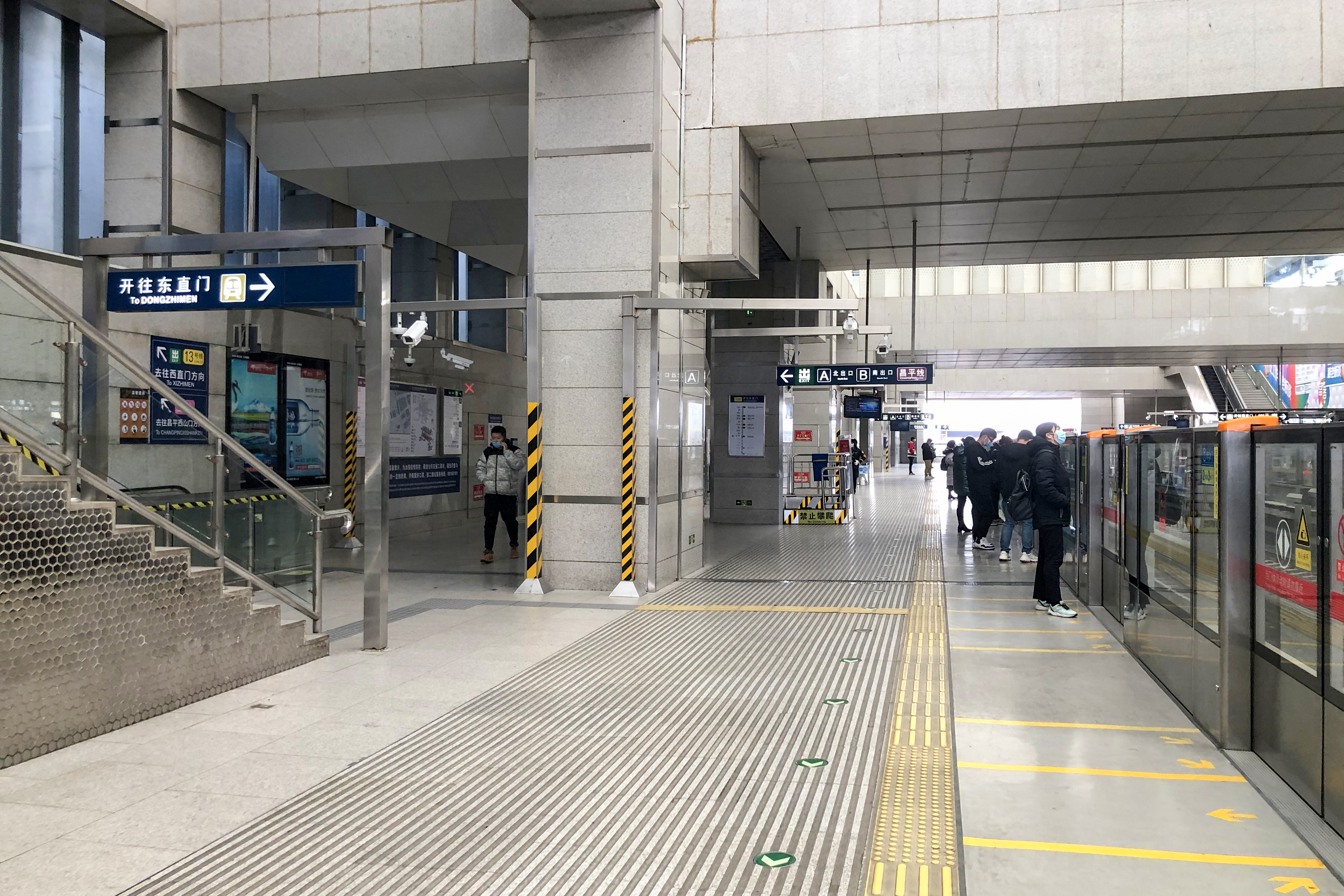
Line 13 northbound platform (March 2021)

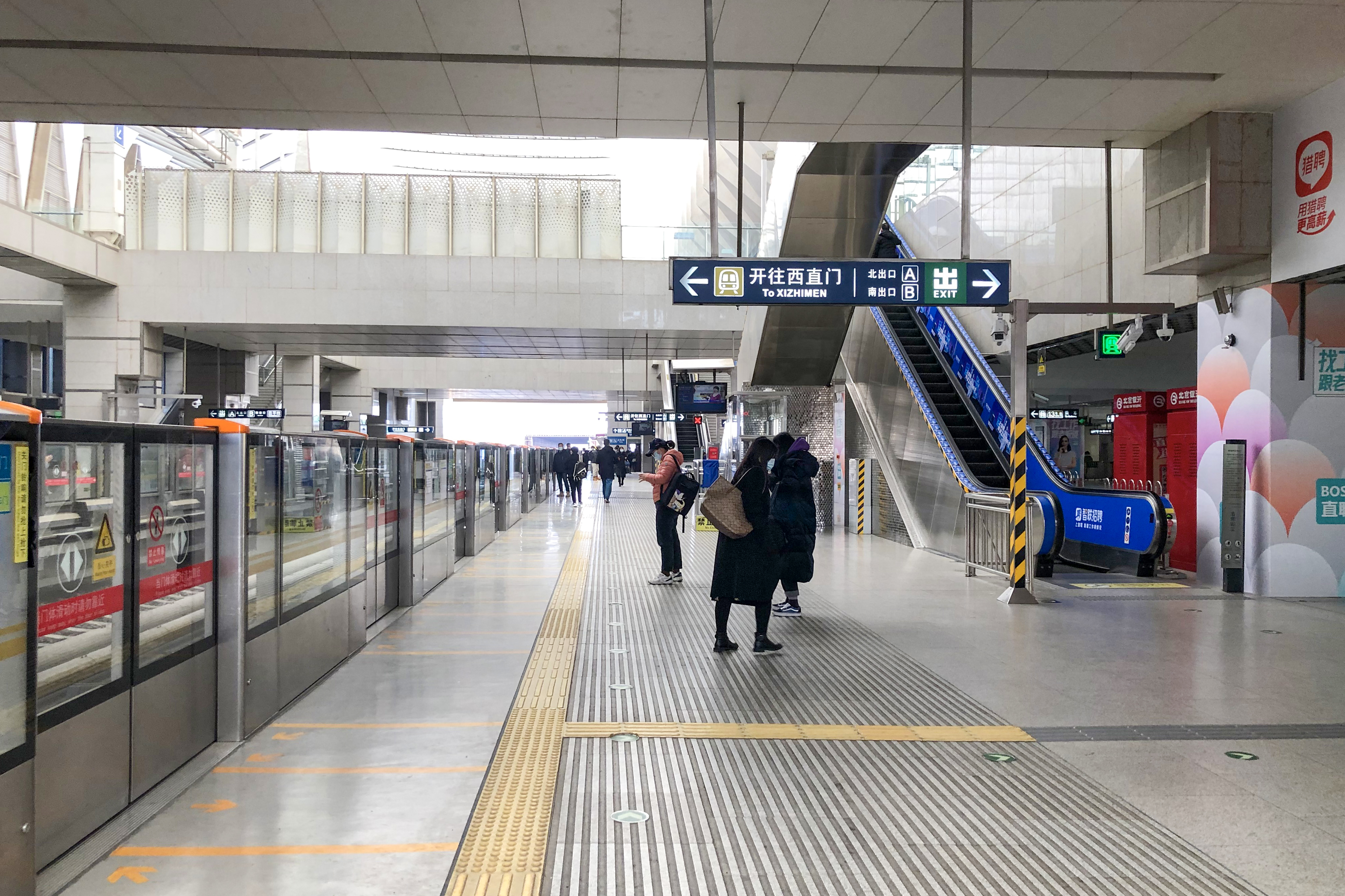
Line 13 southbound platform

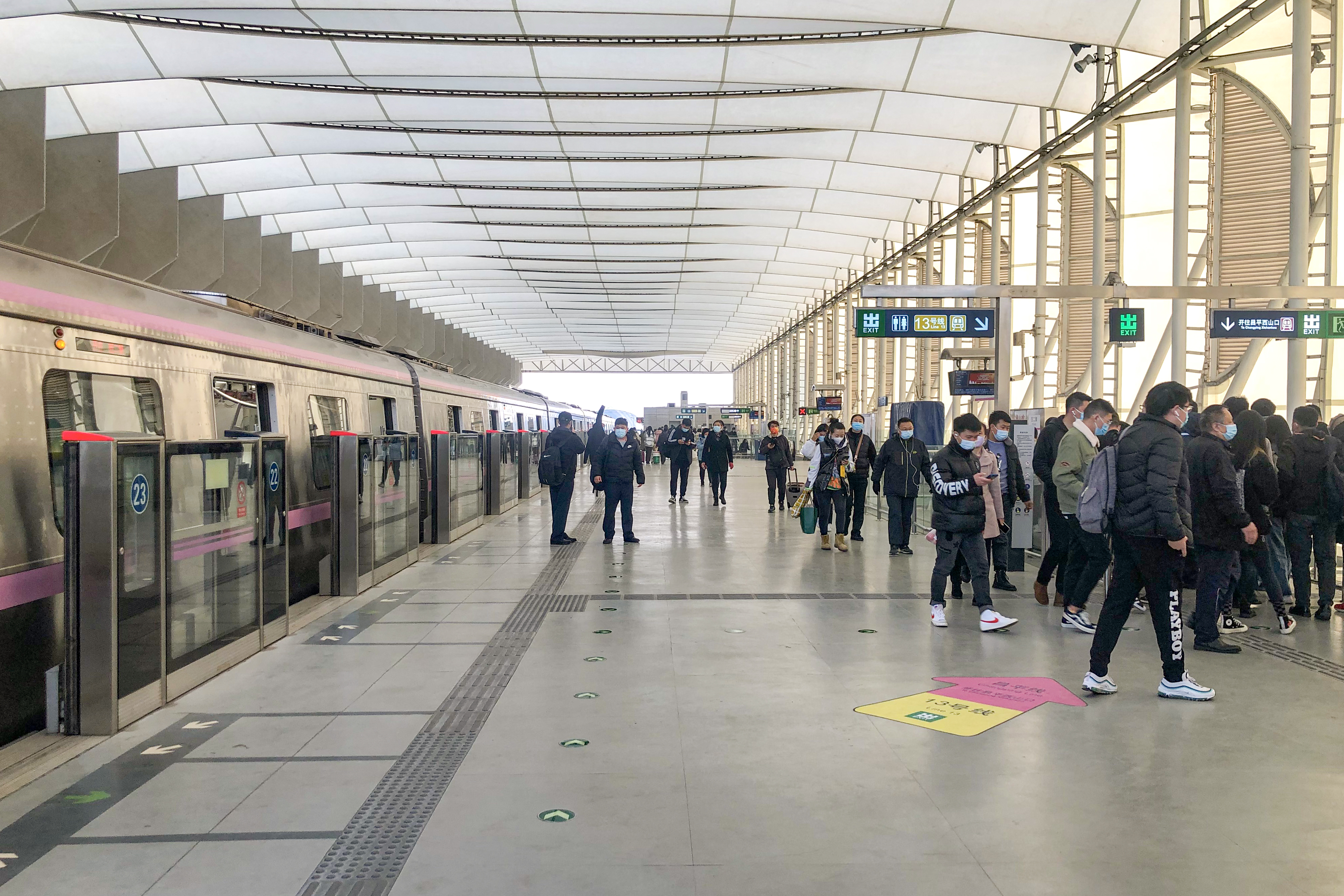
Changping line southbound platform (November 2021)

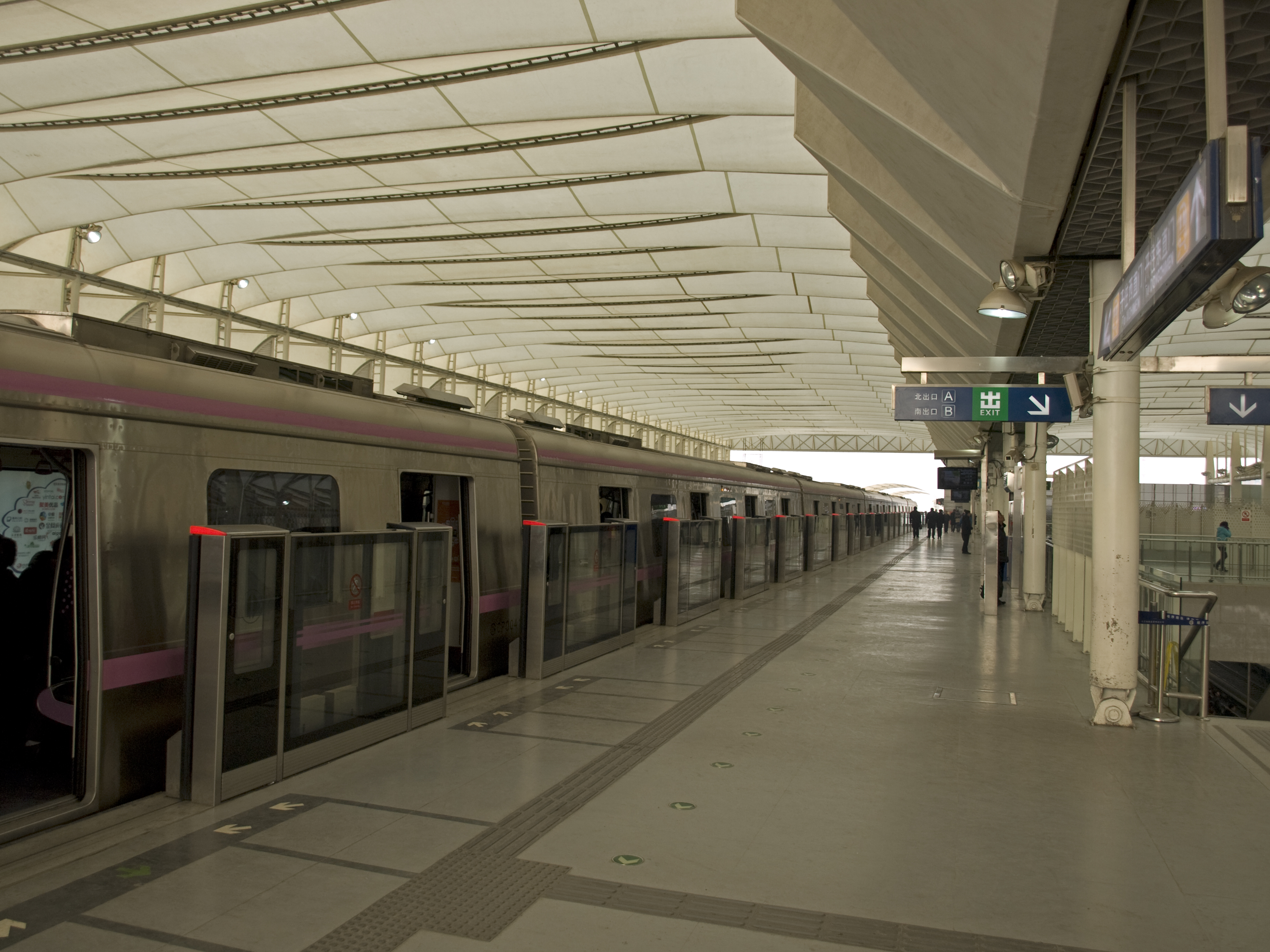
Changping line platform

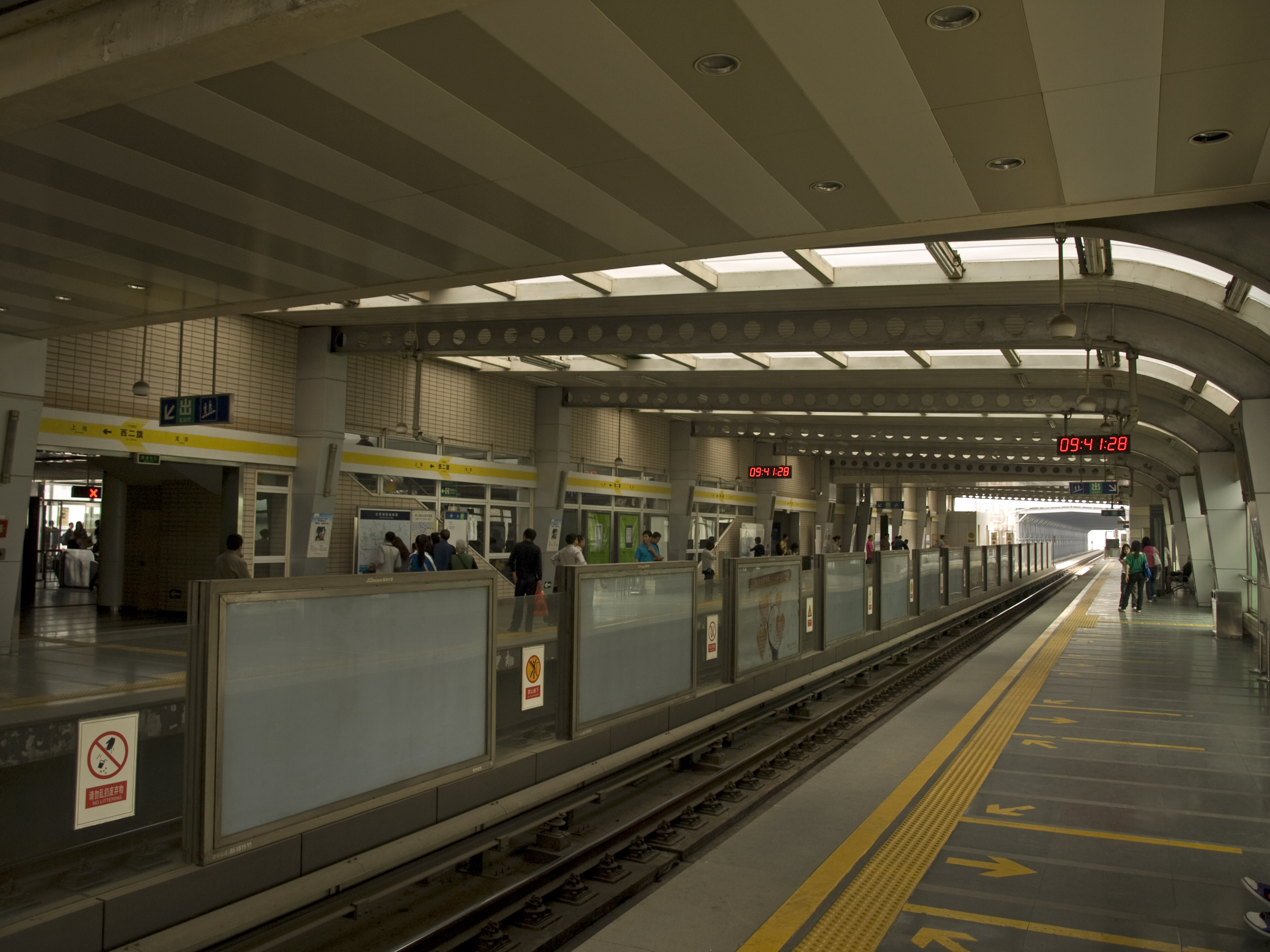
The old station

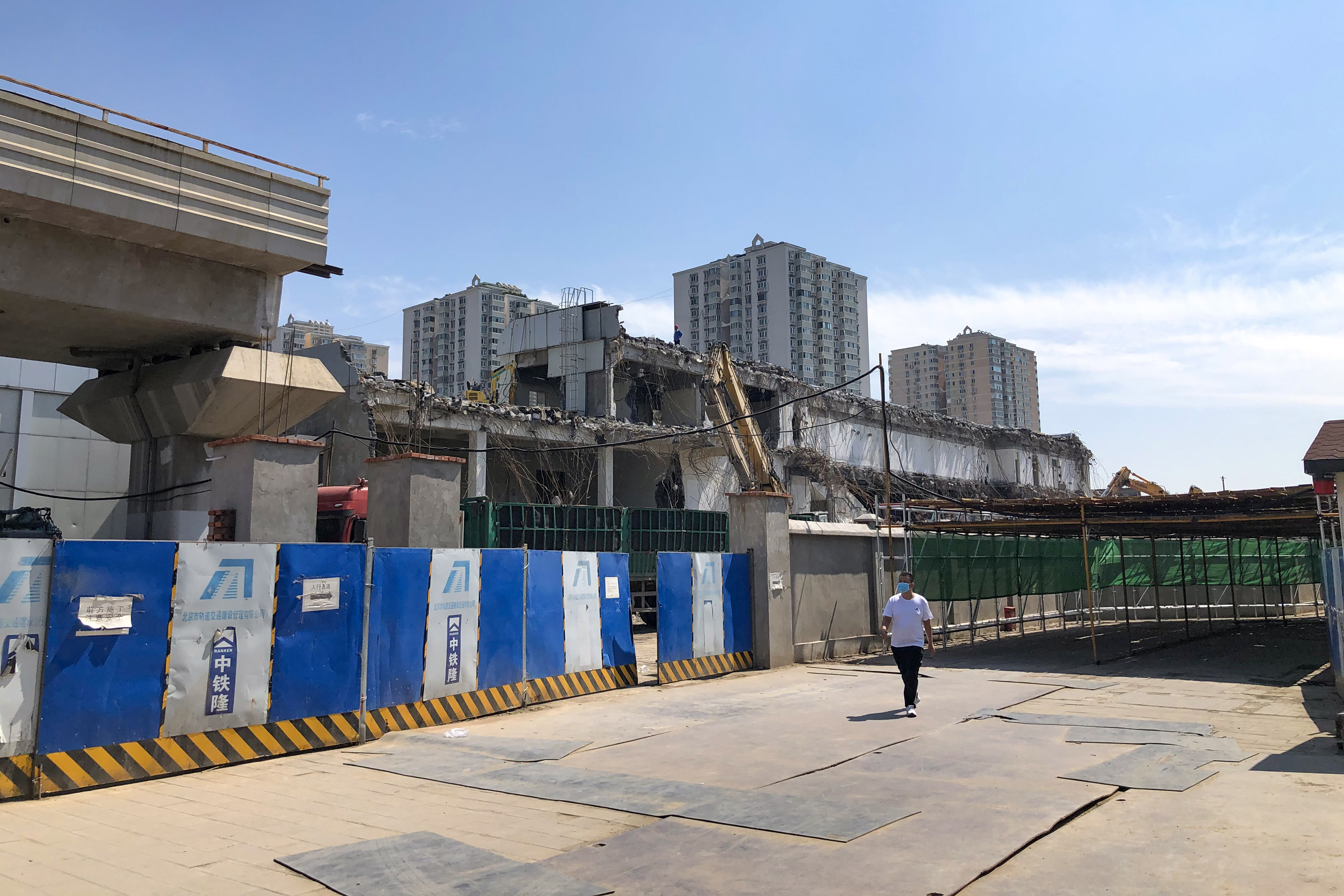
Demolition of the old station

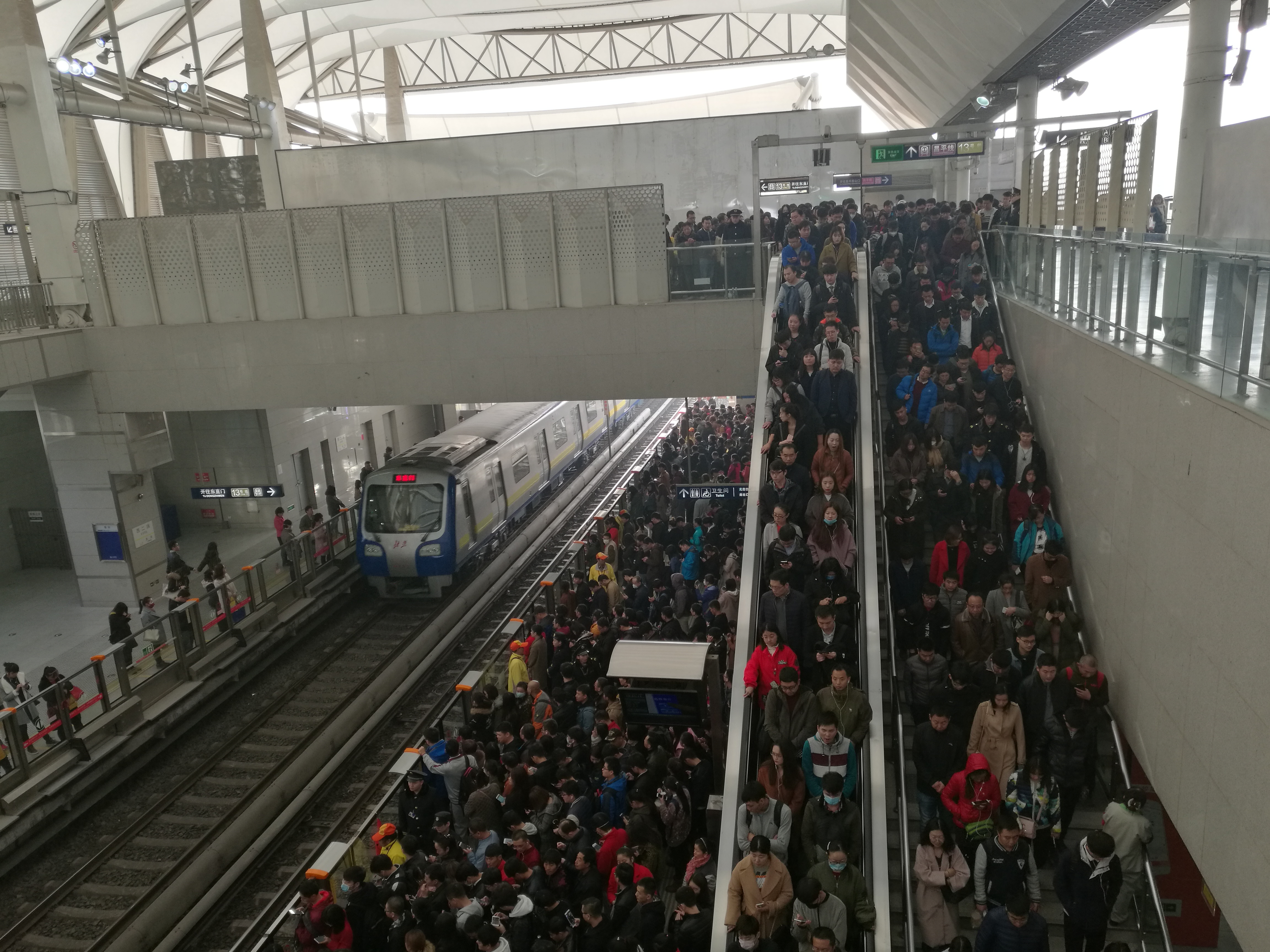
Southbound traffic of Line 13 during a Tuesday morning rush (November 2017)

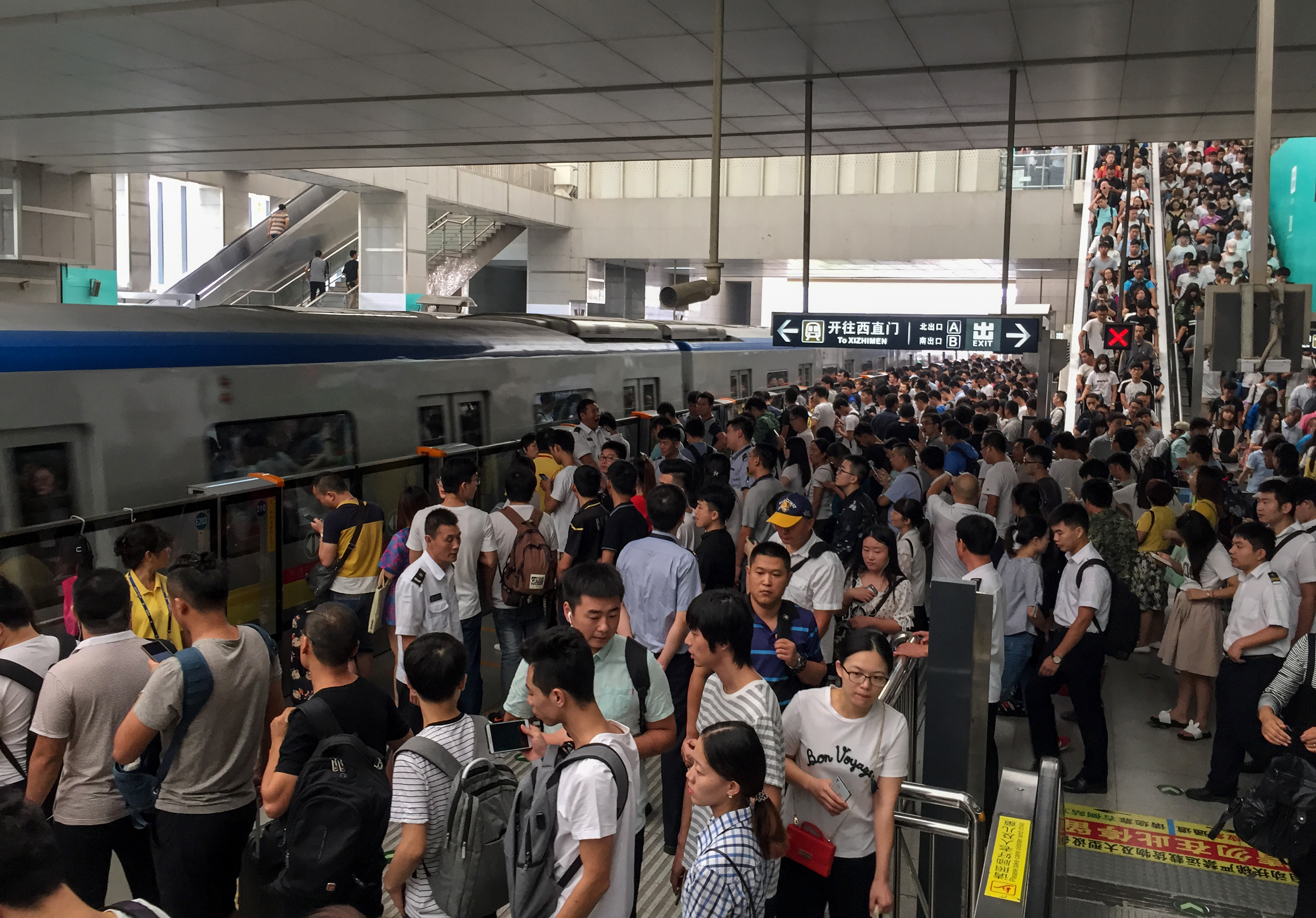
Southbound traffic of Line 13 during a Monday morning rush

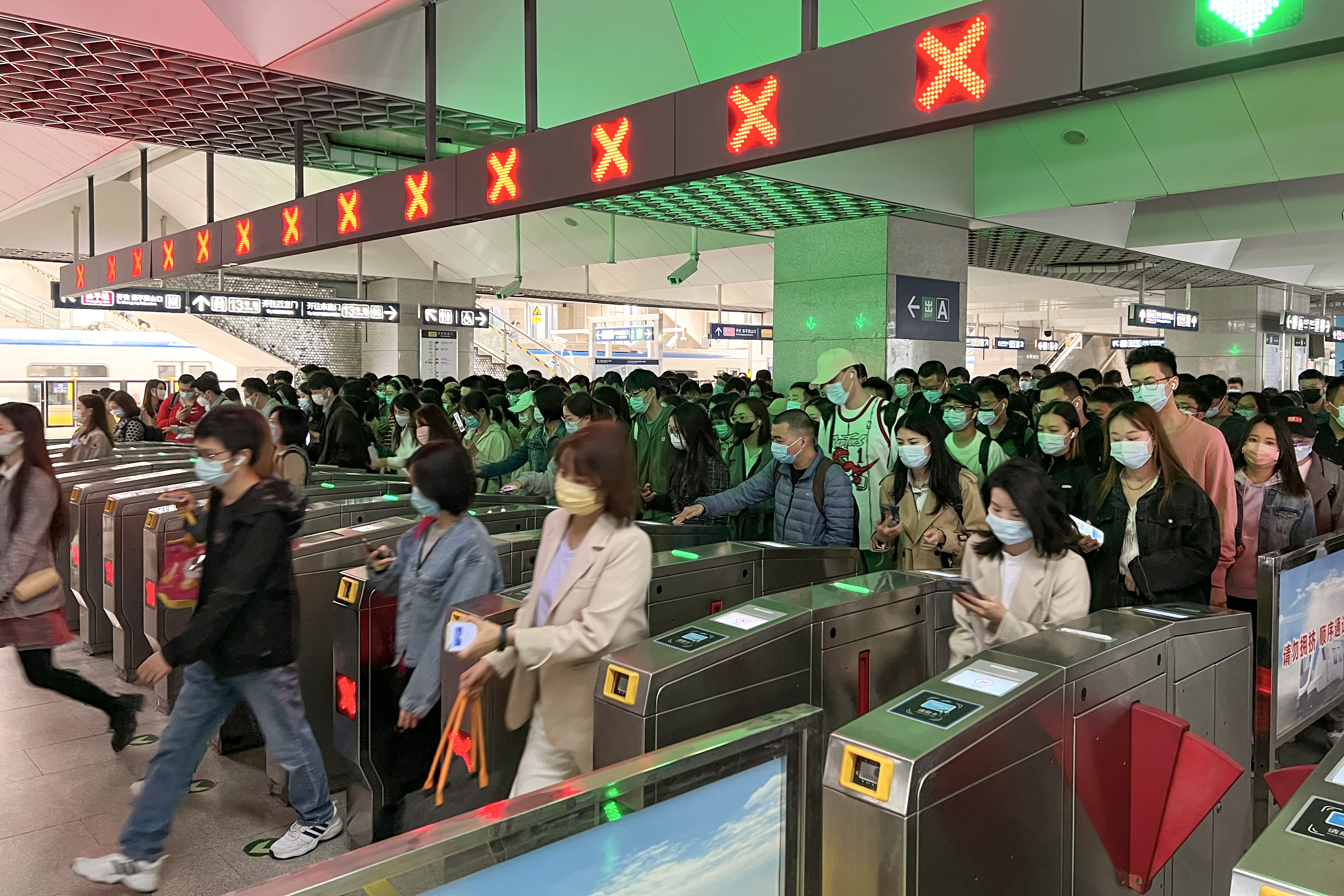
Mass commuting traffic tapping out during a morning rush
