= Qinghe Subdistrict, Beijing =

Qinghe Subdistrict 清河街道
- Subdistrict
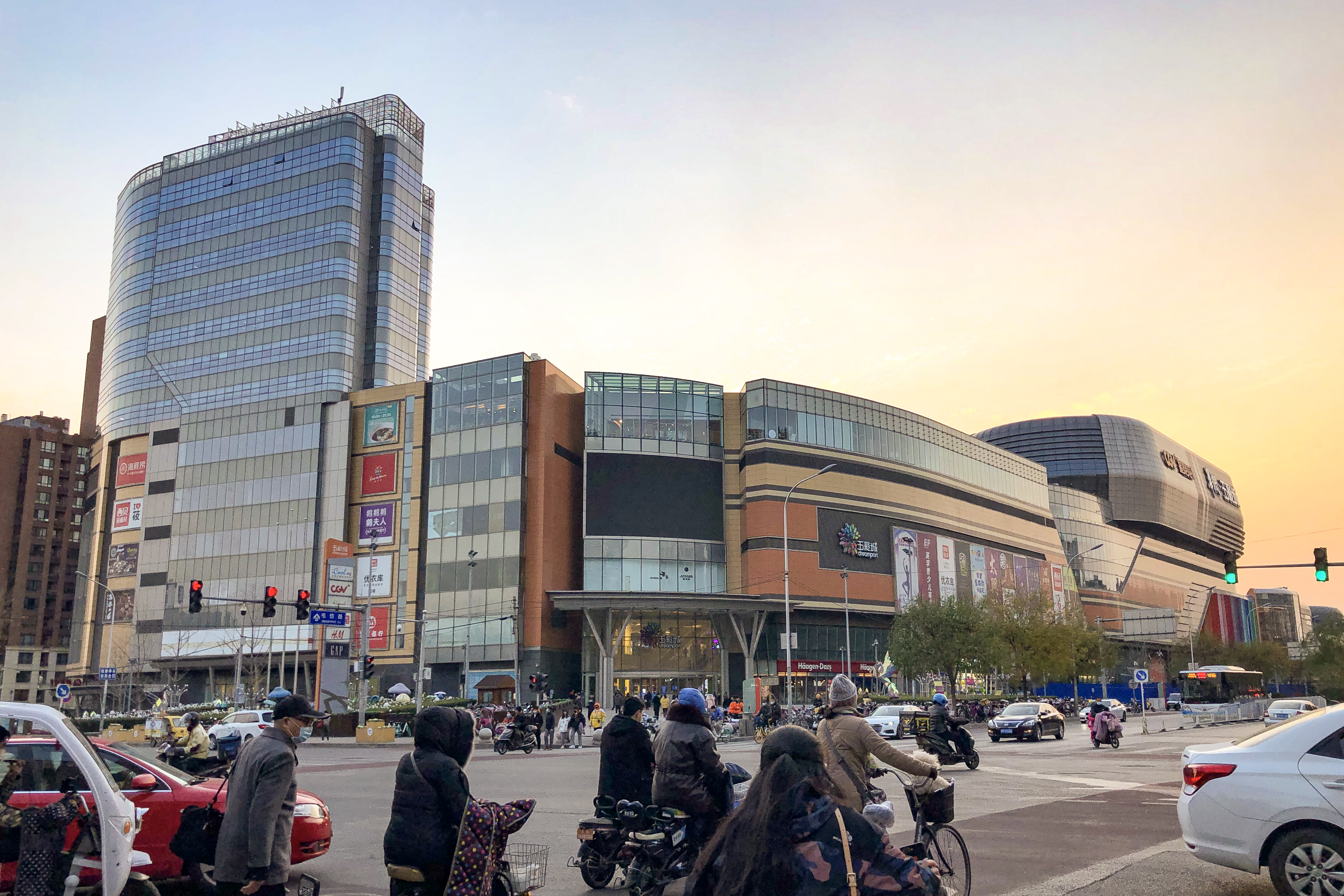
- China Resources Dreamport shopping mall in Qinghe, 2020

- Location within Beijing Location within China
- Coordinates: 40°01′39″N 116°20′22″E
- Country: China
- Municipality: Beijing
- District: Haidian
- Village-level Divisions: 29 communities

Area
  - Total: 9.36 km^{2} (3.61 sq mi)
- Elevation: 45 m (148 ft)

Population (2020)
  - Total: 147,395
  - Density: 15,700/km^{2} (40,800/sq mi)
- Time zone: UTC+8 (China Standard)
- Postal code: 100085
- Area code: 010

Qinghe Subdistrict (Chinese: 清河街道; pinyin: Qīnghé Jiēdào; lit. 'clear river') is a subdistrict of northeastern Haidian District, Beijing, located just outside the 5th Ring Road near that highway's interchange with G6 Beijing–Lhasa Expressway. As of 2020, it had a population of 147,395 under its administration. The People's Liberation Army Rocket Force is headquartered in Qinghe Subdistrict.

The name Qinghe (Chinese: 清河; lit. 'Clear River') came from a town that was located within the subdistrict.

== History ==
History of Qinghe Subdistrict
Year	Status
1908	A wool textile mill was constructed in Qinghe Town to manufacture uniforms for New Army
1948	Transferred from Changping County into Beijing City
1959	Established as Qinghe Subdistrict

== Administrative Divisions ==
As of 2021, there were 29 communities within the subdistrict:

Administrative division code	Subdivision names	Name transliteration
110108017001	清河嘉园	Qinghe Jiayuan
110108017003	四街	Sijie
110108017007	朱房	Zhufang
110108017008	安宁里	Anningli
110108017009	火箭军	Huojianjun
110108017010	长城润滑油	Changcheng Runhuayou
110108017012	空军装备研究院	Kongjun Zhuangbei Yanjiusuo
110108017013	安宁庄东路28号	Anningzhuang Donglu 28 Hao
110108017014	美和园	Meiheyuan
110108017016	花园楼	Huayuanlou
110108017017	毛纺南小区	Maofangnan Xiaoqu
110108017018	毛纺北小区	Maofangbei Xiaoqu
110108017019	北毛	Beimao
110108017020	安宁东路	Anning Donglu
110108017021	阳光	Yangguang
110108017022	安宁北路	Anning Beilu
110108017023	西二旗一里	Xi'erqi Yili
110108017024	安宁庄	Anningzhuang
110108017025	怡美家园	Yimei Jiayuan
110108017026	海清园	Haiqing Yuan
110108017027	当代城市家园	Dangdai Chengshi Jiayuan
110108017029	清上园	Qingshangyuan
110108017030	力度家园	Lidu Jiayuan
110108017031	小营西路32号院	Xiaoying Xilu 32 Haoyuan
110108017032	领秀硅谷	Lingxiu Guigu
110108017033	学府树家园第一	Xuefushu Jiayuan Diyi
110108017034	智学苑	Zhixueyuan
110108017035	领秀新硅谷	Lingxiu Xinguigu
110108017036	学府树家园第二	Xuefushu Jiayuan Di'er

== See also ==
- List of township-level divisions of Beijing
