= Huoyingdong station =

Beijing Subway Line 18 station

Huoyingdong 霍营东
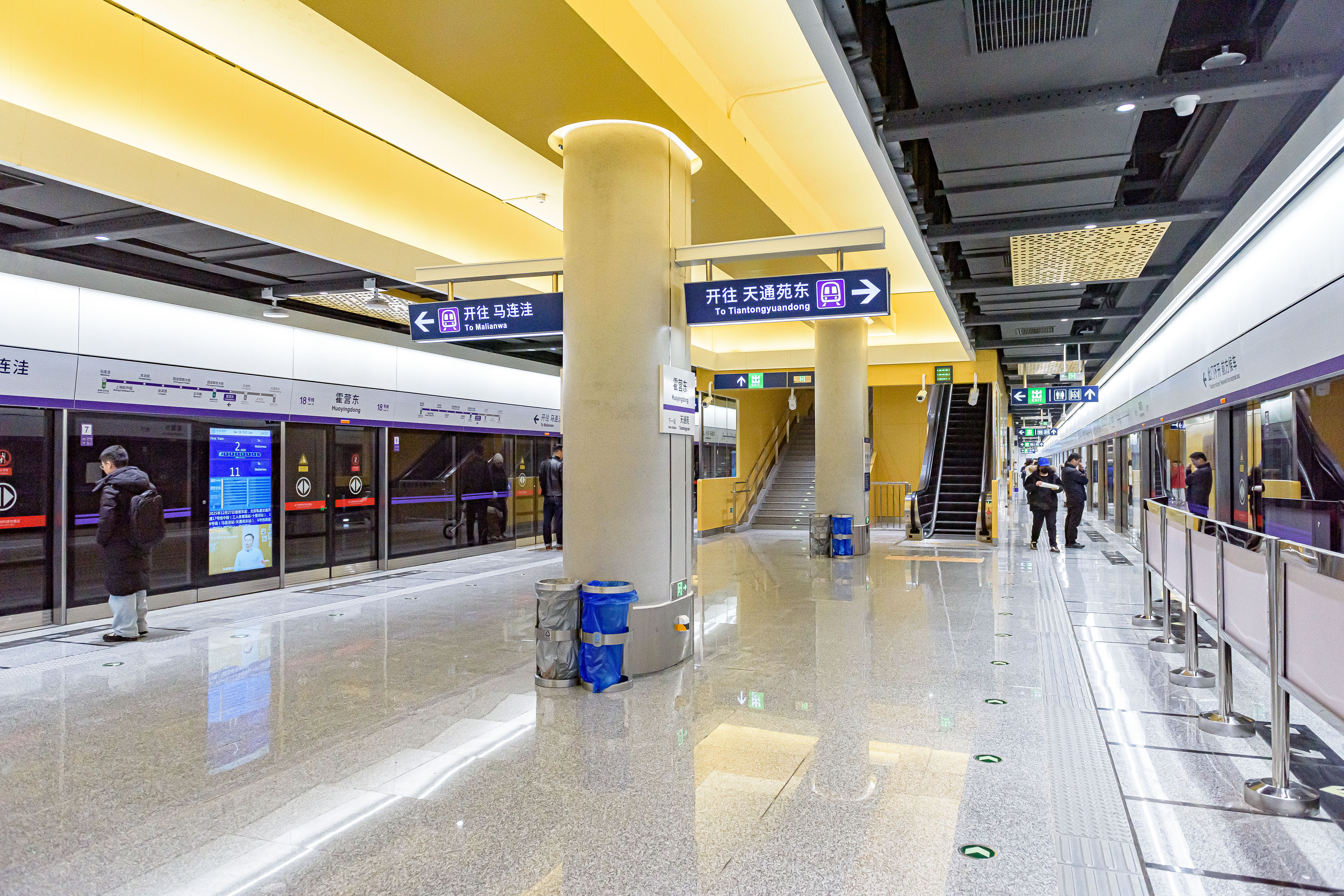
- Platform in December 2025

Chinese name
- Simplified Chinese: 霍营东站
- Traditional Chinese: 霍營东站
Transcriptions
Standard Mandarin
- Hanyu Pinyin: Huòyíngdōng zhàn

General information
- Location: Intersection of Huilongguan East Street (回龙观东大街) and Huoying East Road (霍营东路), Huoying Subdistrict and Dongxiaokou Town; Changping District, Beijing; China
- Coordinates: 40°04′50″N 116°22′10″E
- System: Beijing Subway station
- Operator: Beijing Mass Transit Railway Operation Corporation Limited
- Line: Line 18
- Platforms: 2 (1 island platform)
- Tracks: 2

Construction
- Structure type: Underground
- Accessible: Yes

History
- Opened: December 27, 2025; 7 months ago
- Former names: Huilongguandong (回龙观东)

Services
Preceding station	Beijing Subway	Following station
Huilongguan Dongdajie towards Malianwa	Line 18	Tiantongyuan towards Tiantongyuandong
Location
- Location within Beijing

Huoyingdong station (simplified Chinese: 霍营东站; traditional Chinese: 霍營东站; pinyin: Huòyíngdōng zhàn) is a station on Line 18 of the Beijing Subway. It opened on December 27, 2025.

== Location ==
The station is located under the intersection of Huilongguan East Street and Huoying East Road in Huoying Subdistrict and Dongxiaokou Town in Changping District.

== Station features ==
The station has an underground island platform.

=== Exits ===
The station has 6 exits, lettered A1, A2, B, C, D1 and D2. Exits A2 and C are accessible via elevators. Exits A2 and D2 do not feature escalators.

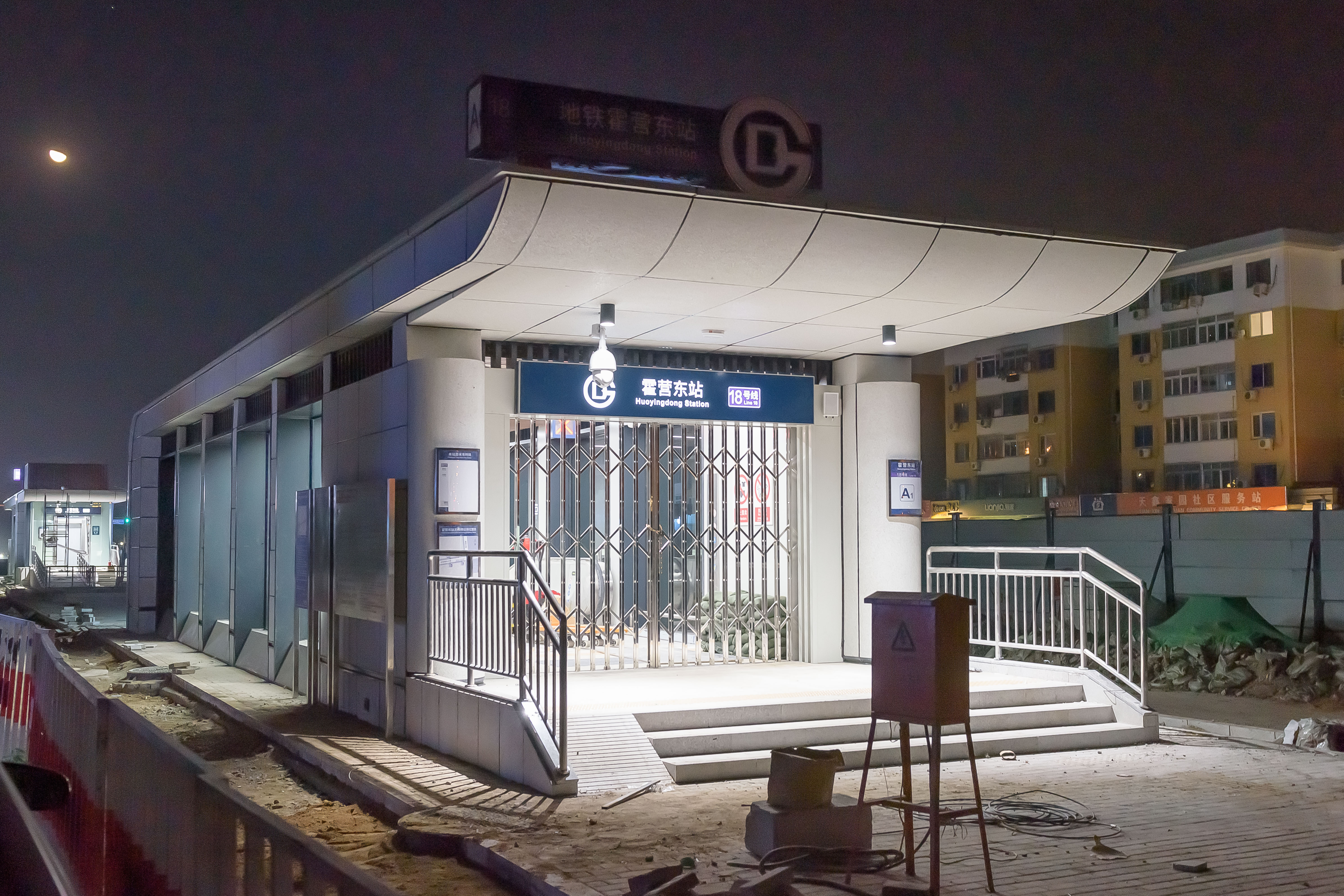
Exit A1

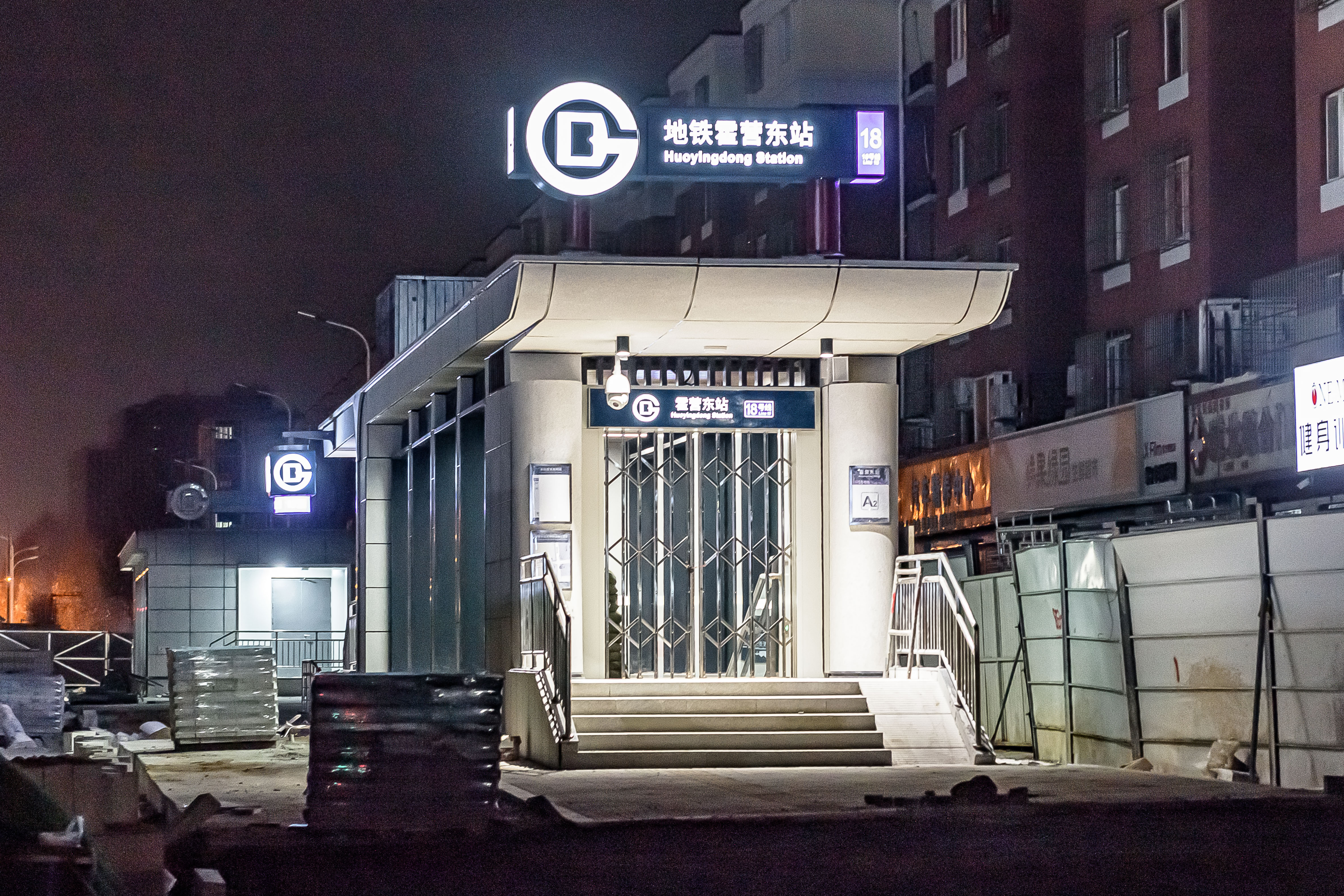
Exit A2

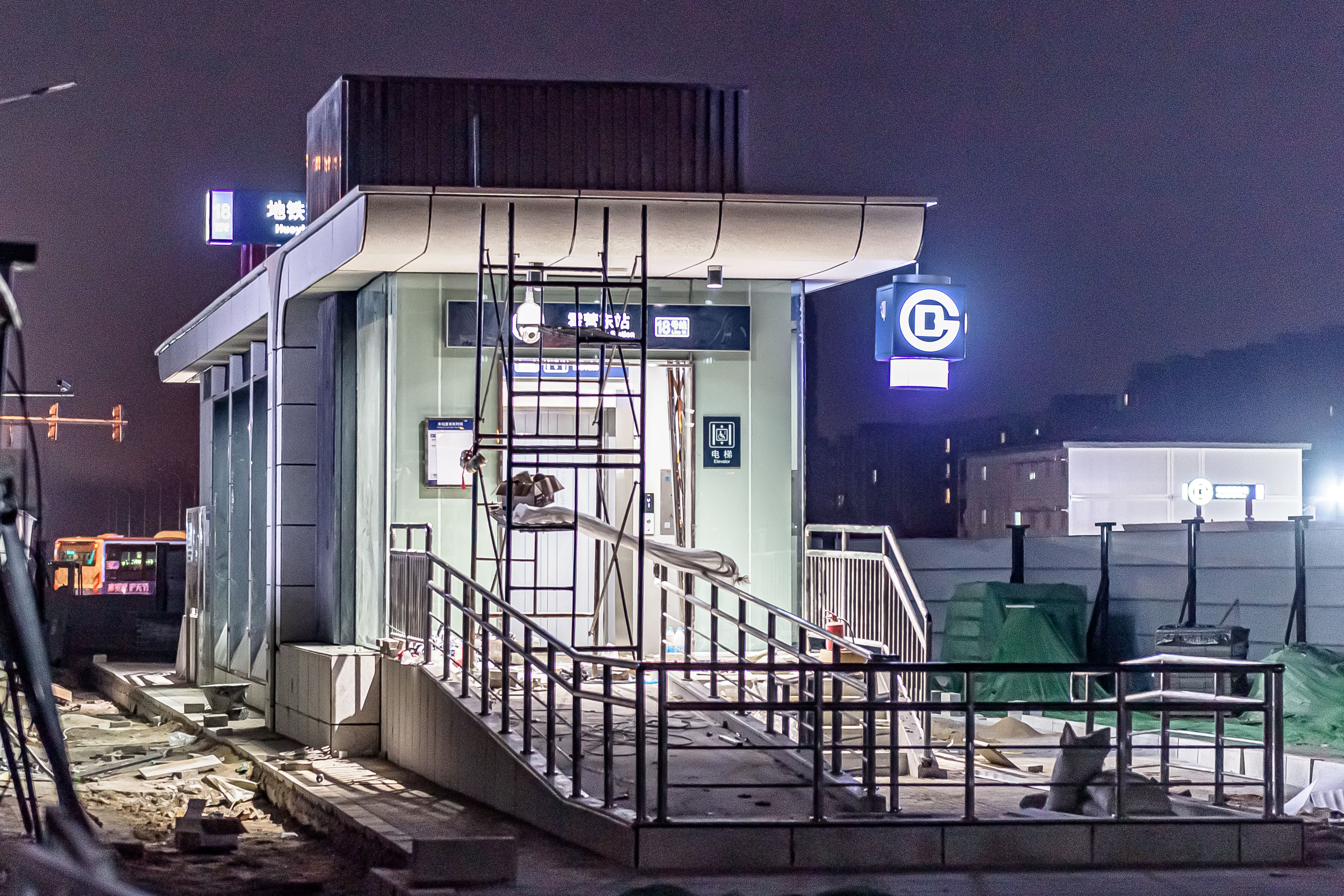
Exit A2 (elevator exit)

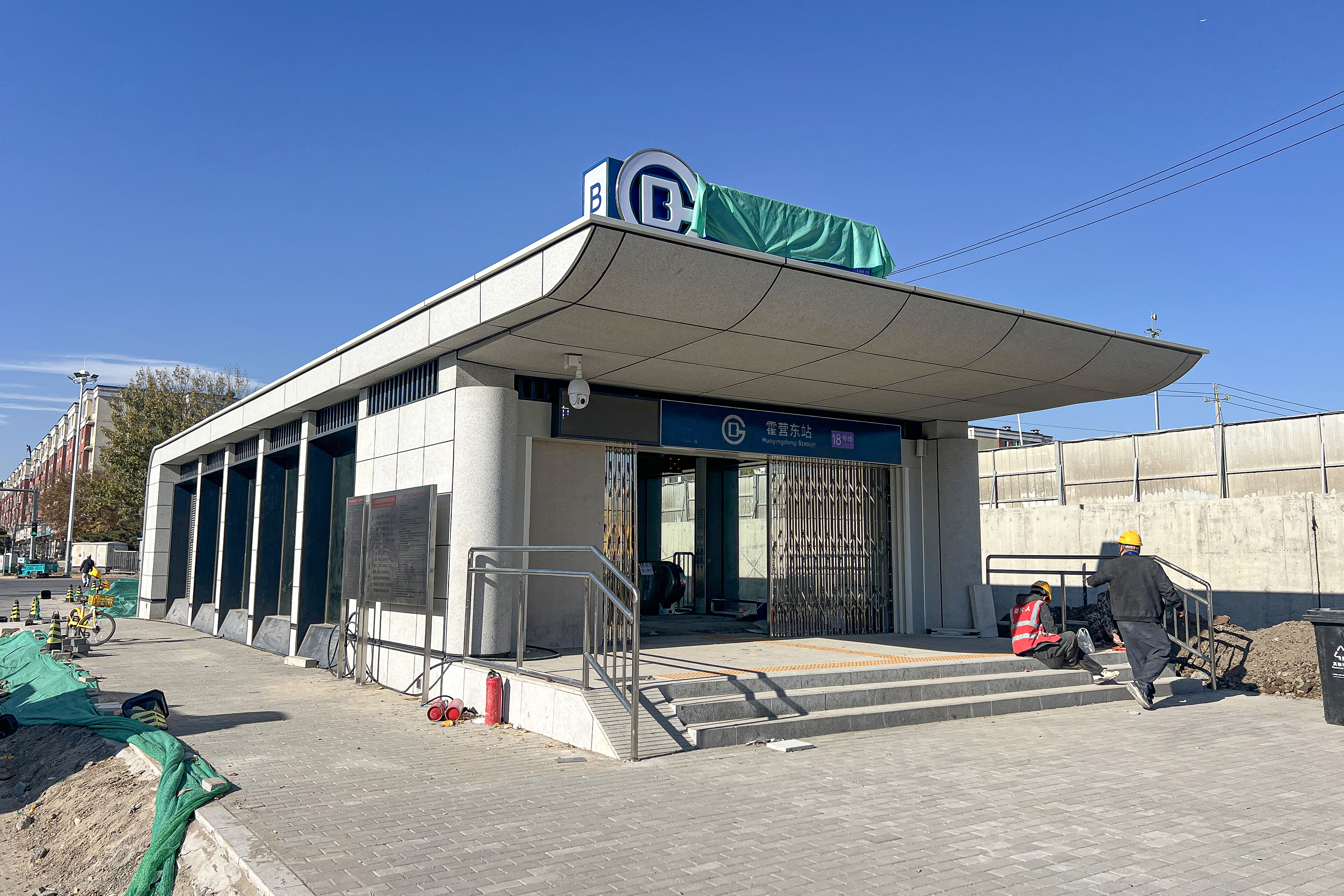
Exit B

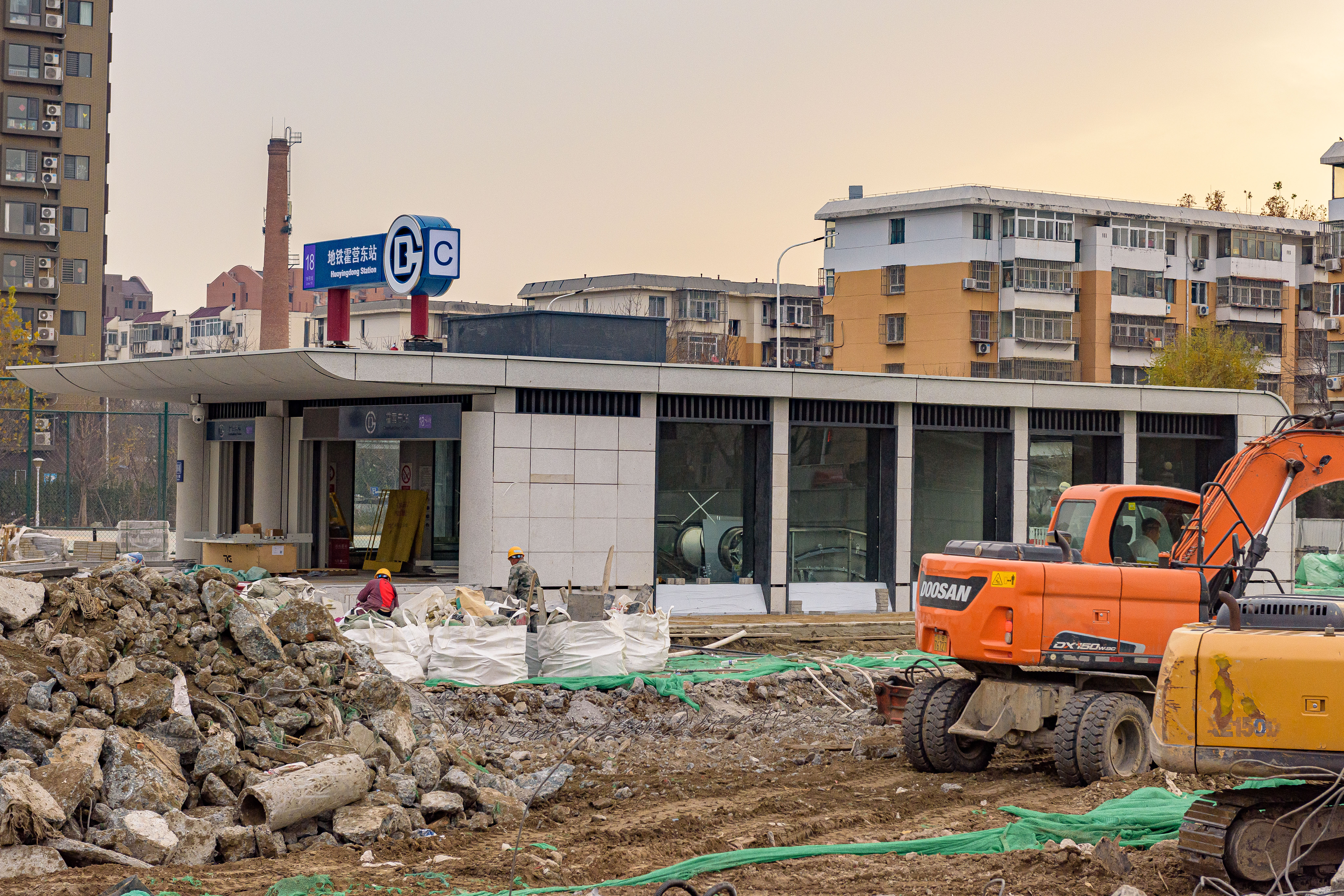
Exit C

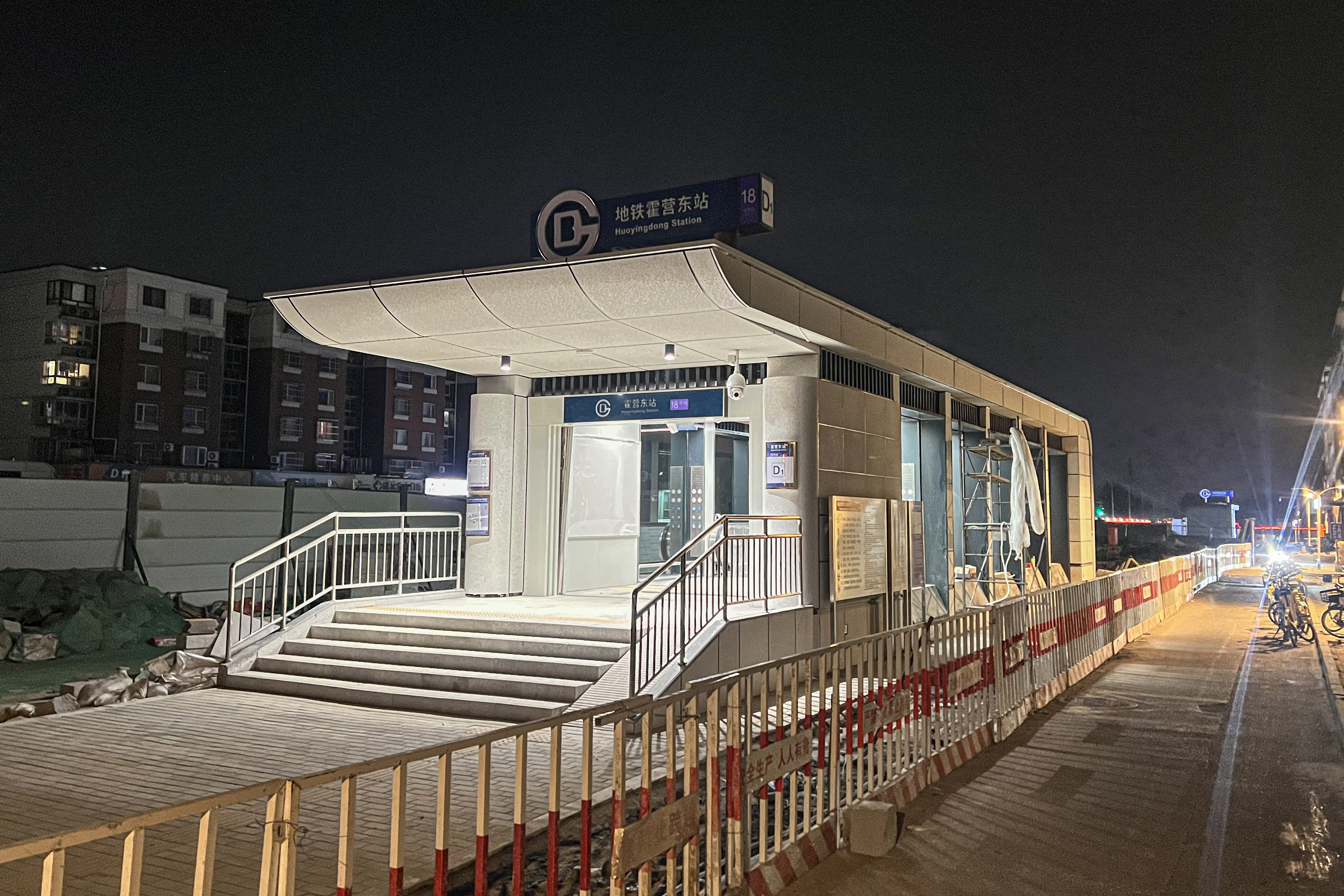
Exit D1

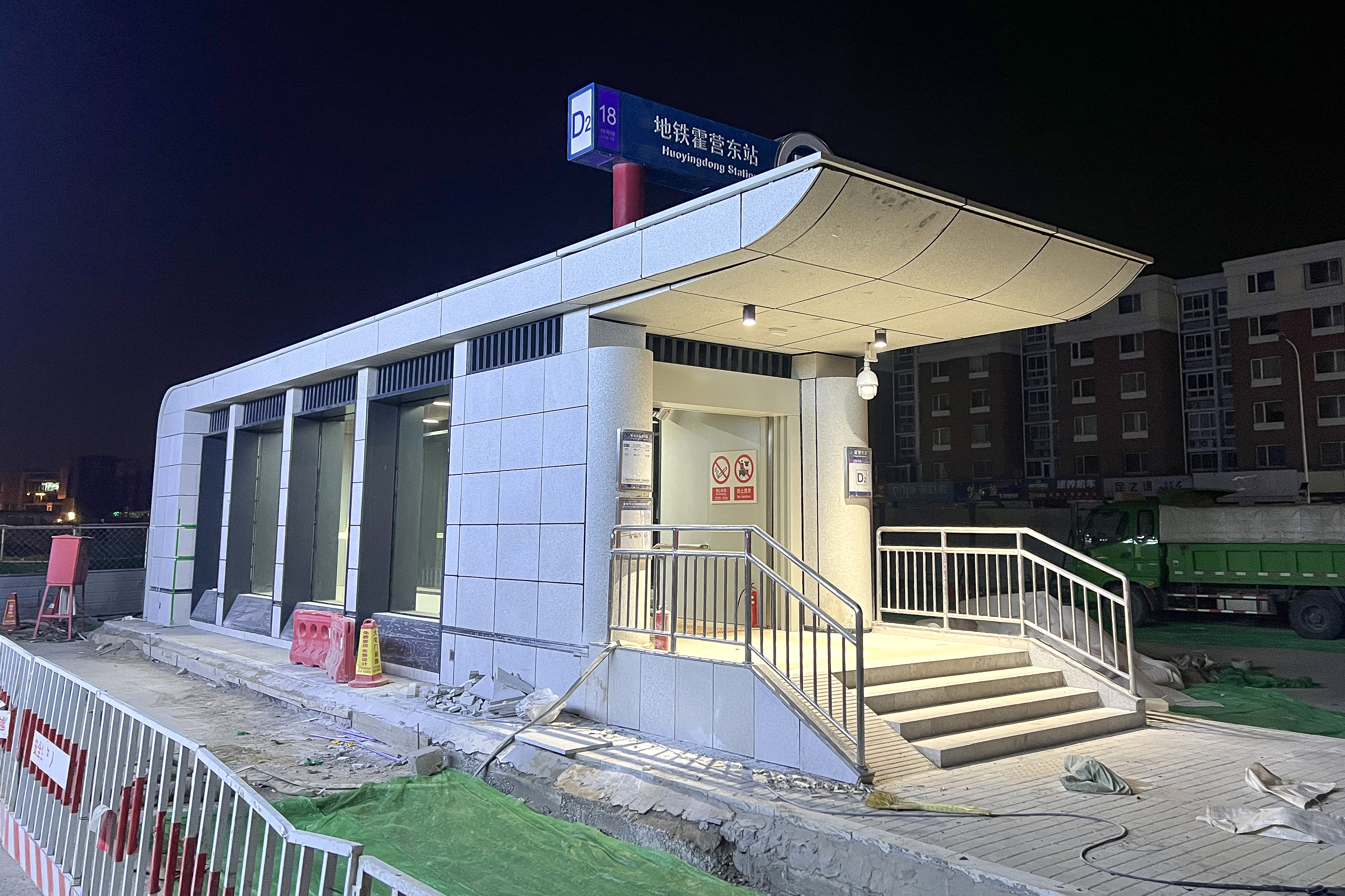
Exit D2

== History ==
On November 25, 2024, the main structure of the station was topped out.

On March 20, 2025, the Beijing Municipal Commission of Planning and Natural Resources announced the naming plan for the expansion and upgrading project of Line 13, and planned to name the station as Huoyingdong.
