= Tiantongyuan station =

Beijing Subway Line 5 and Line 18 station

Tiantongyuan 天通苑
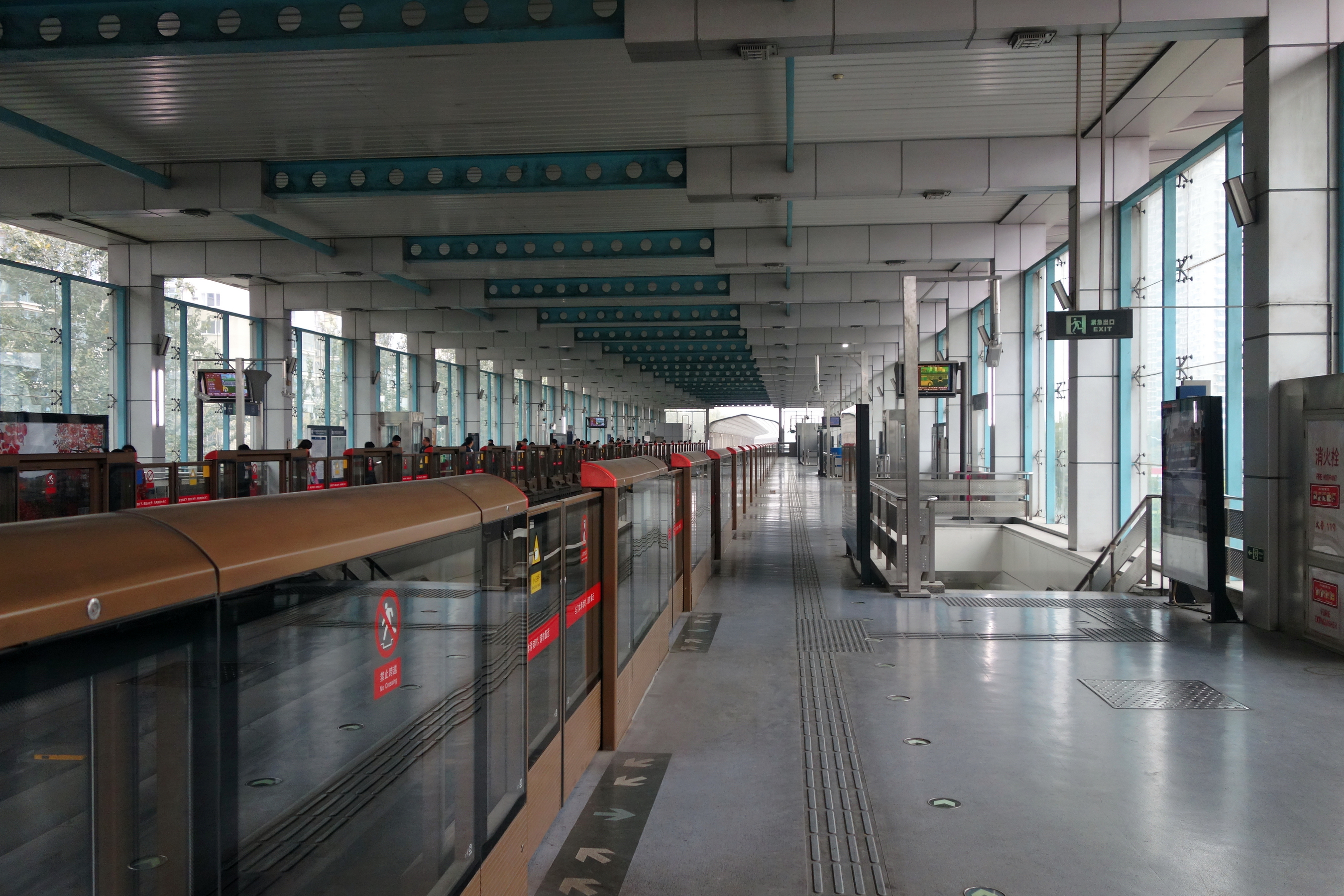
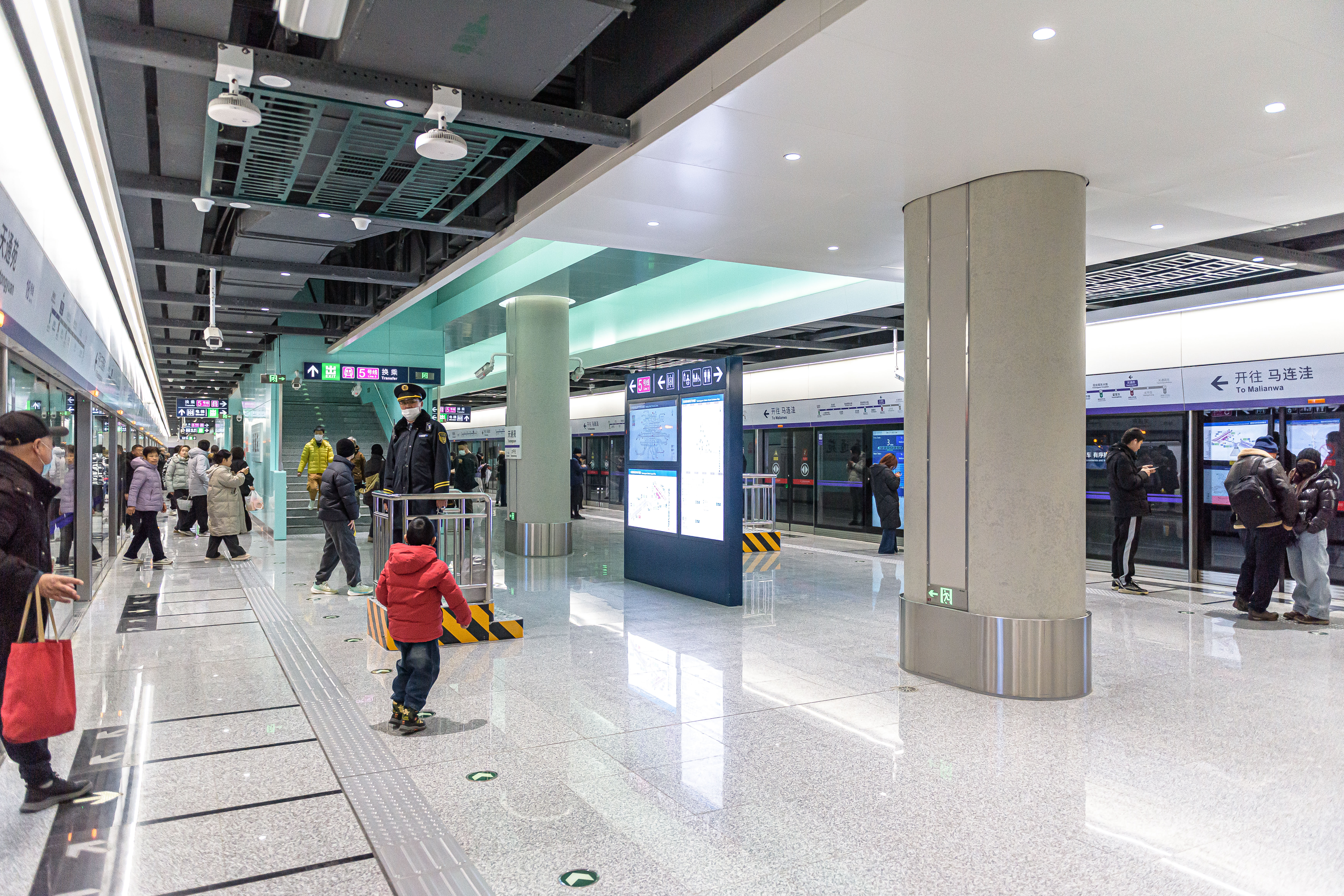
- Line 5 platform Line 18 platform

General information
- Location: Litang Road (立汤路); Tiantongyuanbei Subdistrict, Changping District, Beijing; China
- Coordinates: 40°04′31″N 116°24′46″E
- Operator: Beijing Mass Transit Railway Operation Corporation Limited
- Lines: Line 5; Line 18
- Platforms: 4 (2 side platforms and 1 island platform)
- Tracks: 4

Construction
- Structure type: Elevated (Line 5); Underground (Line 18)
- Accessible: Yes

History
- Opened: Line 5: October 7, 2007; 18 years ago; Line 18: December 27, 2025; 7 months ago

Services
Preceding station	Beijing Subway	Following station
Tiantongyuanbei Terminus	Line 5	Tiantongyuannan towards Songjiazhuang
Huoyingdong towards Malianwa	Line 18	Taipingzhuang towards Tiantongyuandong
Location
- Location within Beijing

Tiantongyuan station (Chinese: 天通苑站; pinyin: Tiāntōngyuàn Zhàn) is an interchange station between Line 5 and Line 18 of the Beijing Subway. The Line 5 station opened on October 7, 2007, and the Line 18 station opened on December 27, 2025.

== History ==
=== Line 5 ===
It is known as Tiantongyuanxi station during construction. It was suggested to renamed to Tiantongyuan station or Taipingzhuang station in October 2005, and officially named as Tiantongyuan station.

=== Line 18 ===
Construction started on 14 November 2022. It opened on December 27, 2025.

== Station features ==
The station has 2 elevated side platforms for Line 5 and an underground island platform for Line 18.

=== Exits ===
There are 6 exits, lettered A, B, C, D, E1 and E2. Exit A is accessible via a ramp and Exits C and E2 are accessible via elevators.

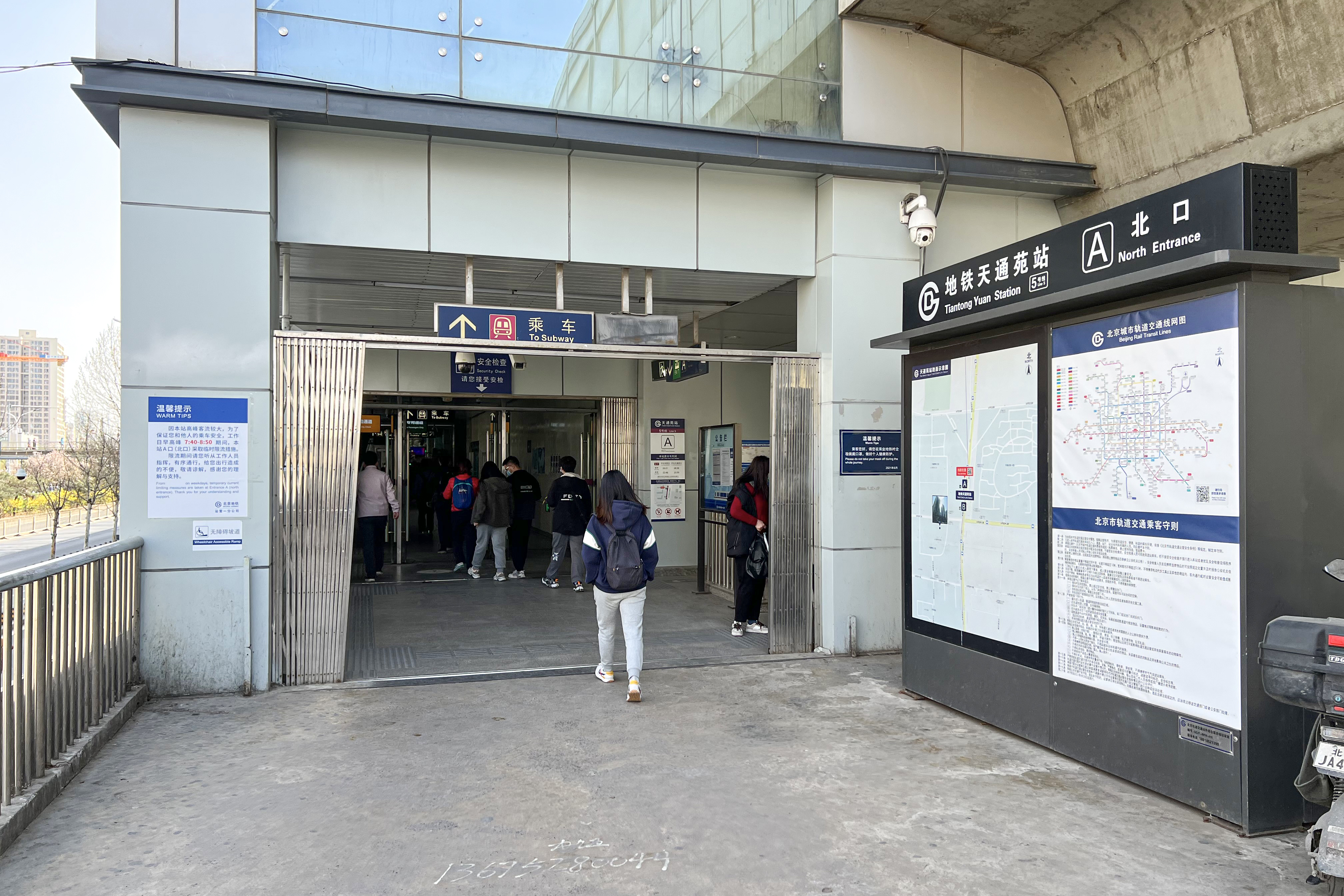
Exit A

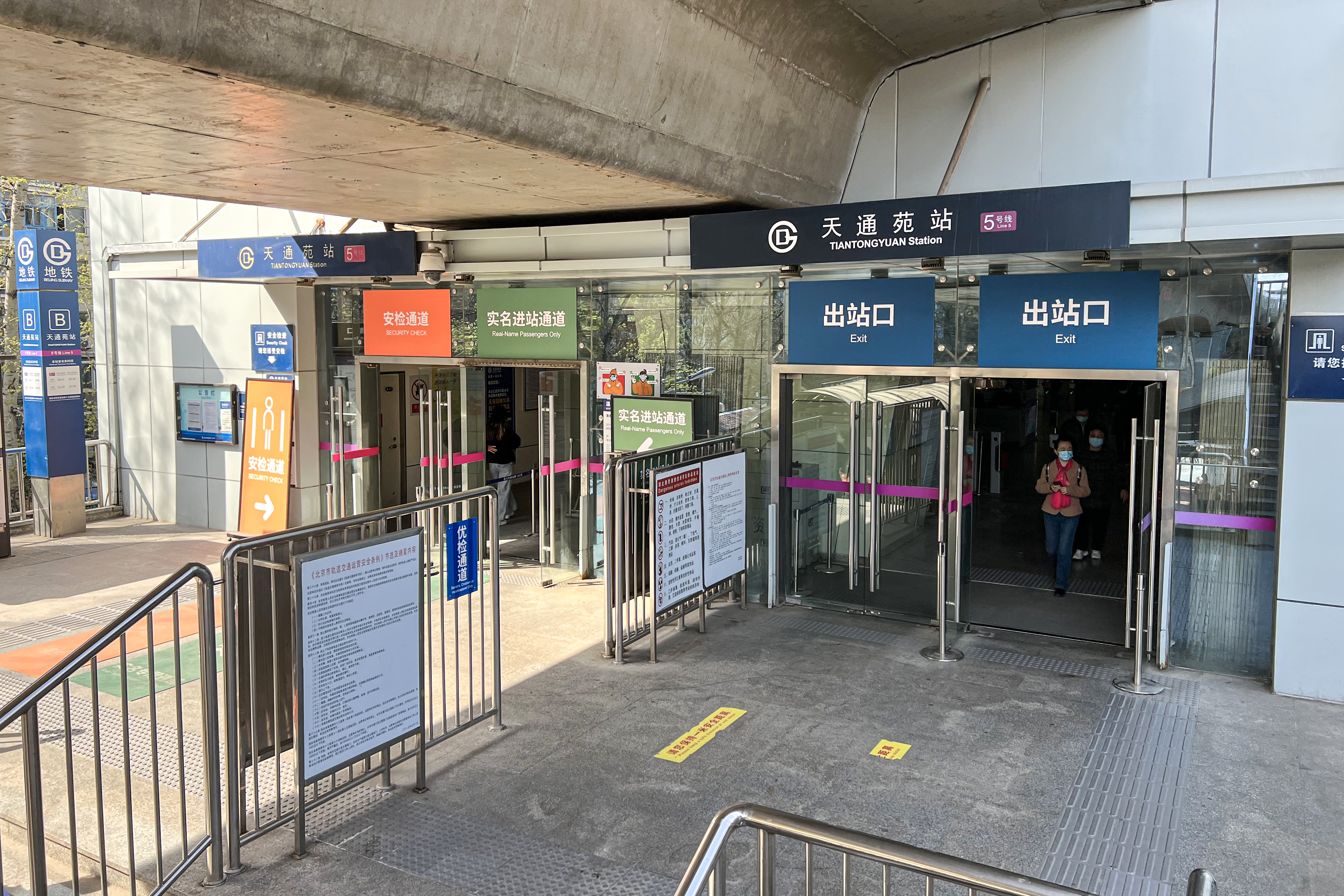
Exit B

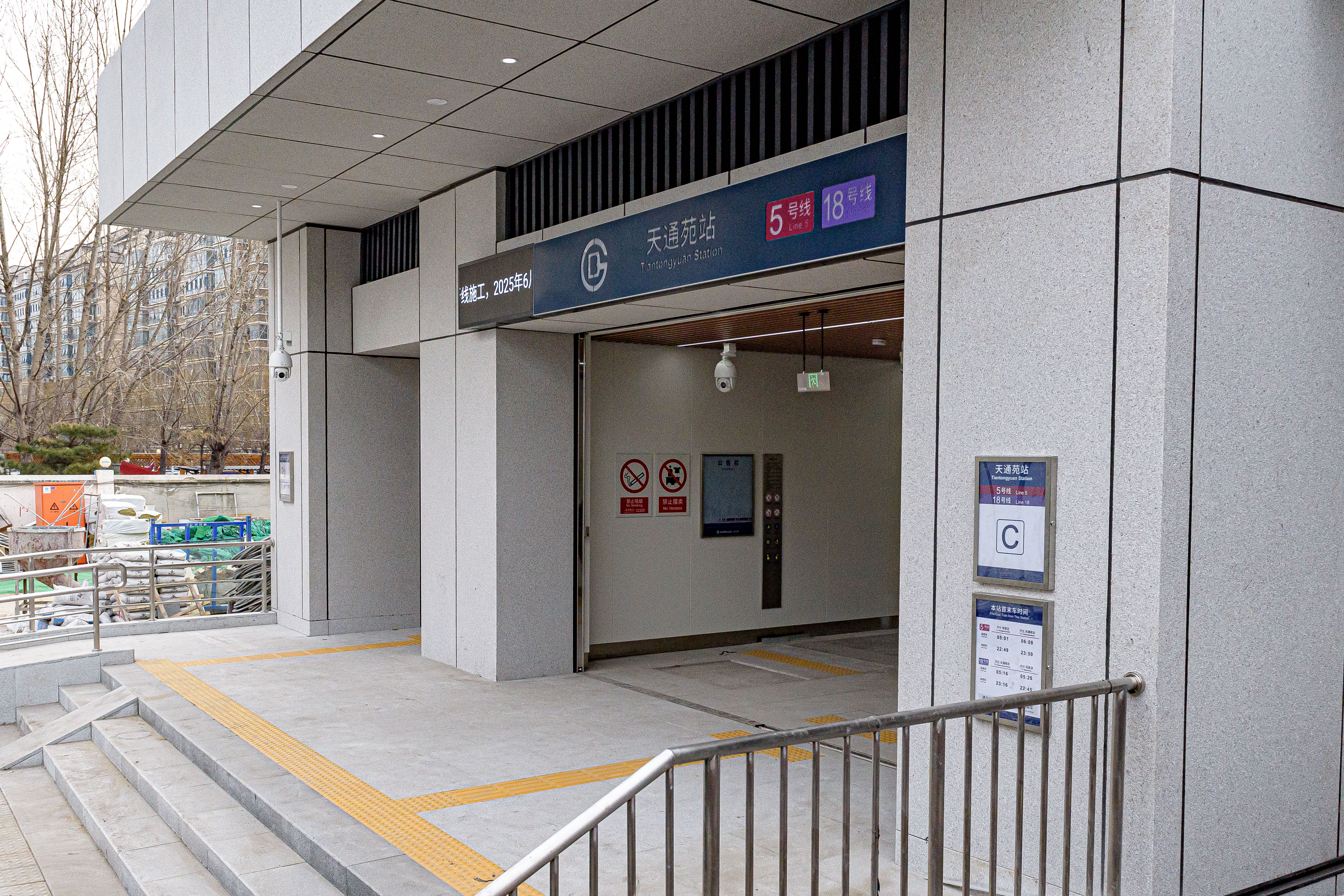
Exit C

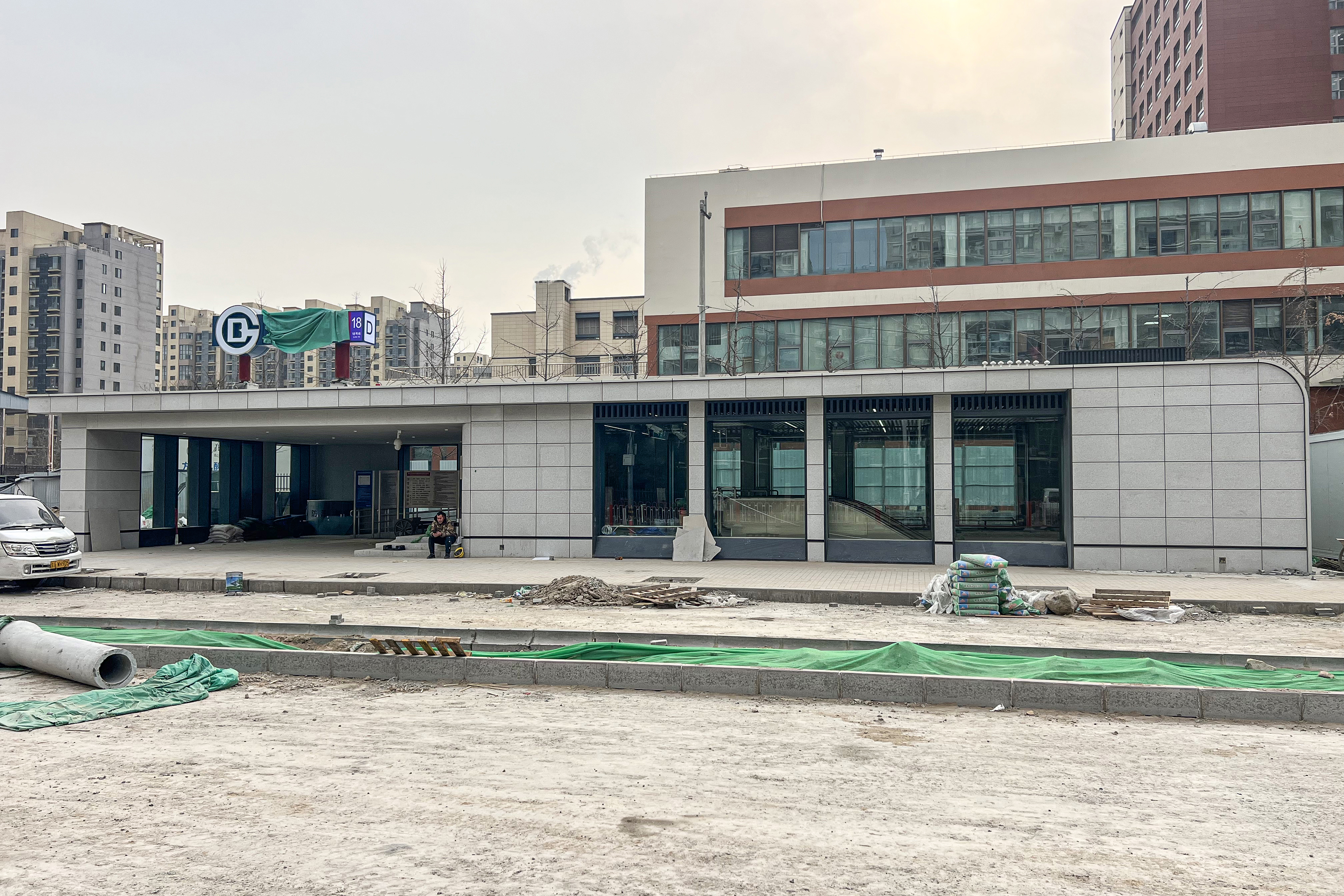
Exit D

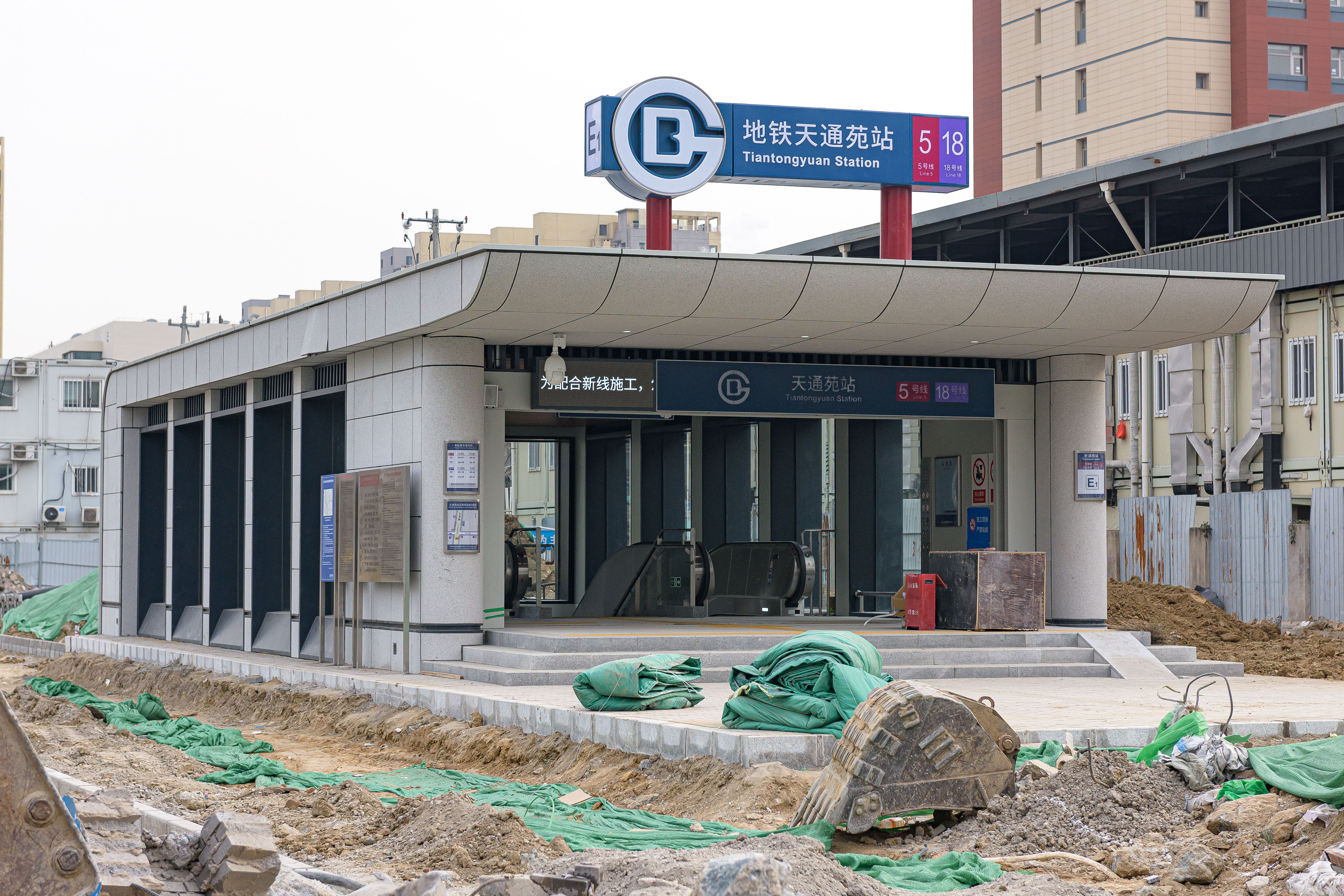
Exit E1

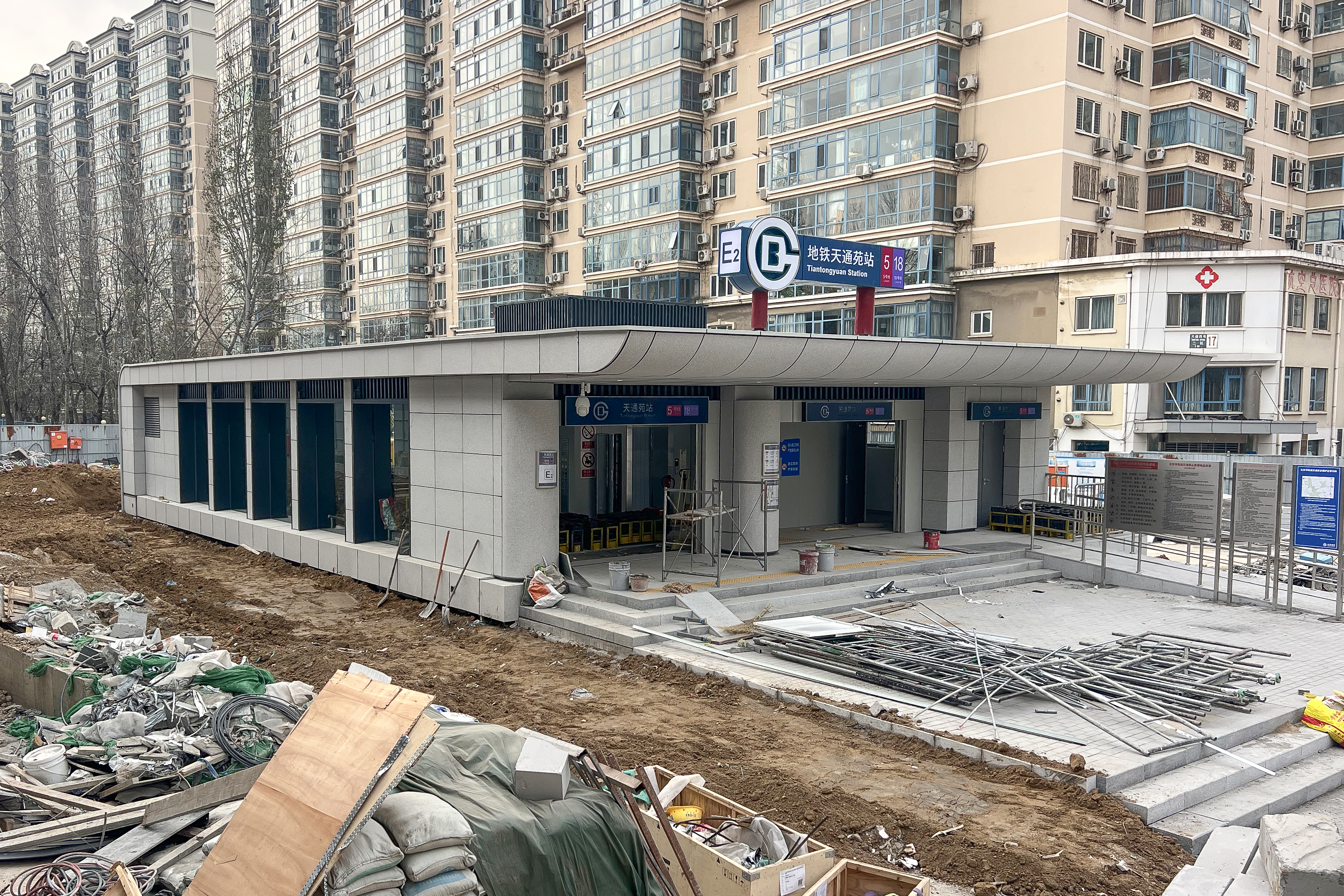
Exit E2

== Gallery ==
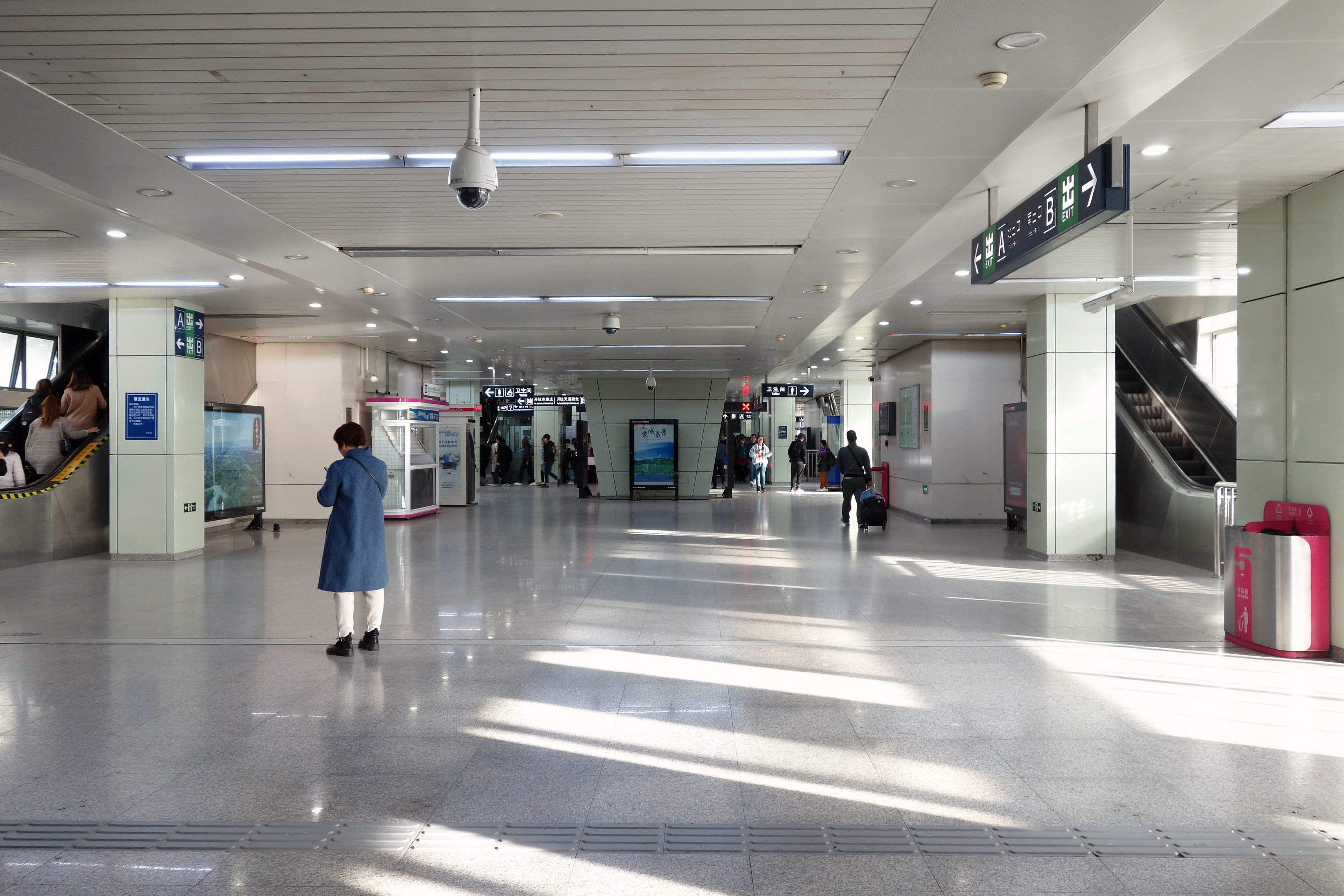
Concourse

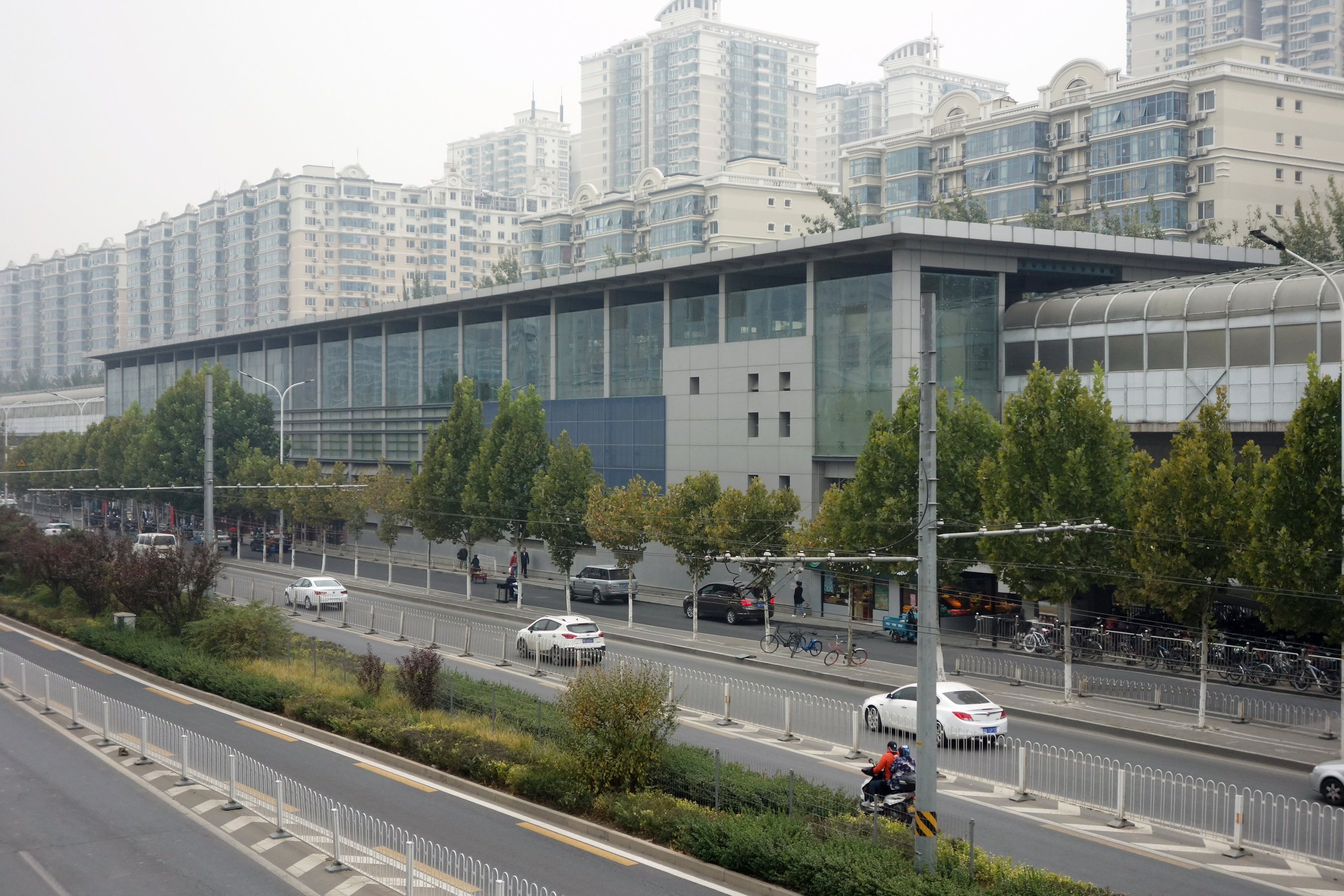
Station exterior

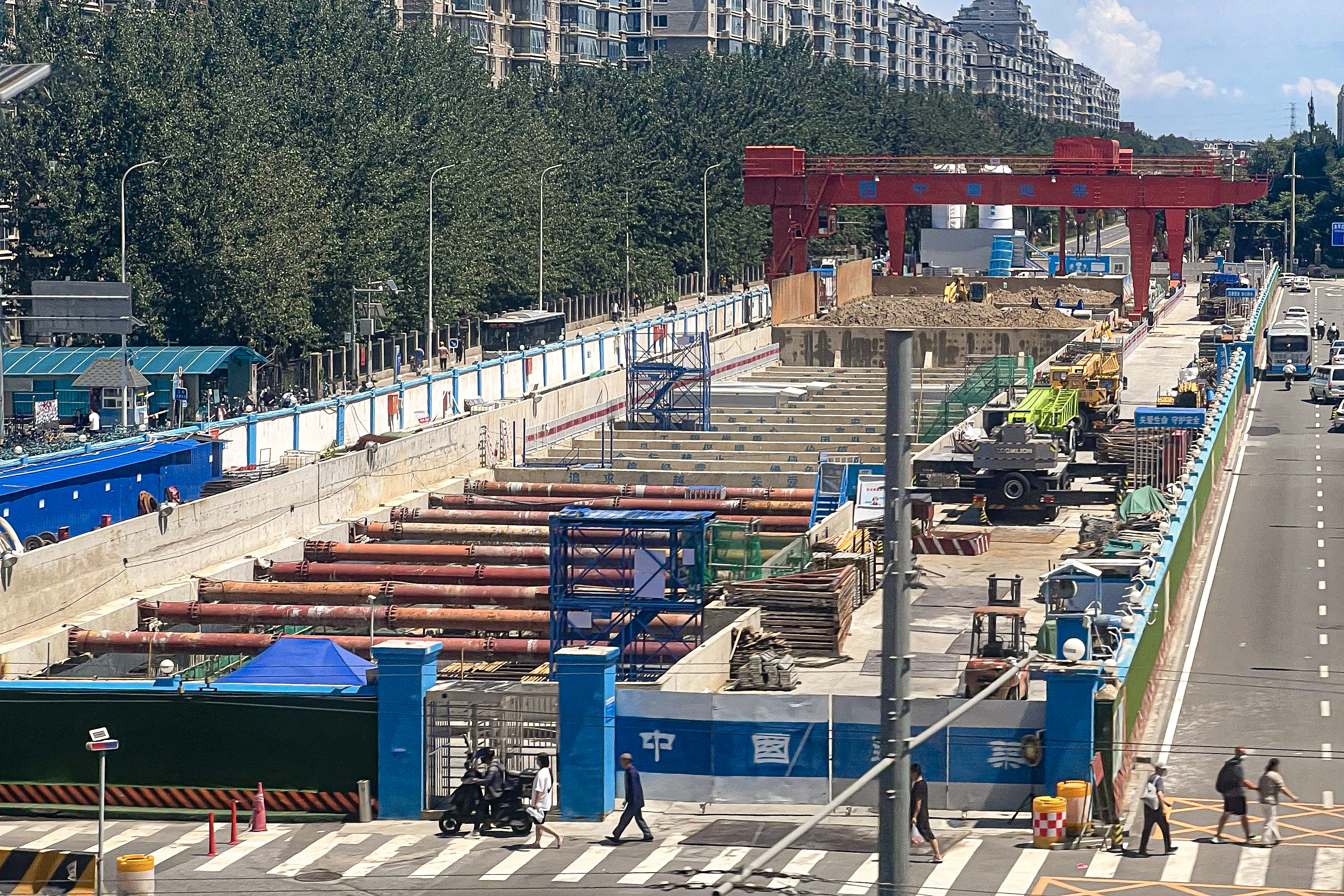
Line 18 construction site
