= List of Beijing Subway stations =

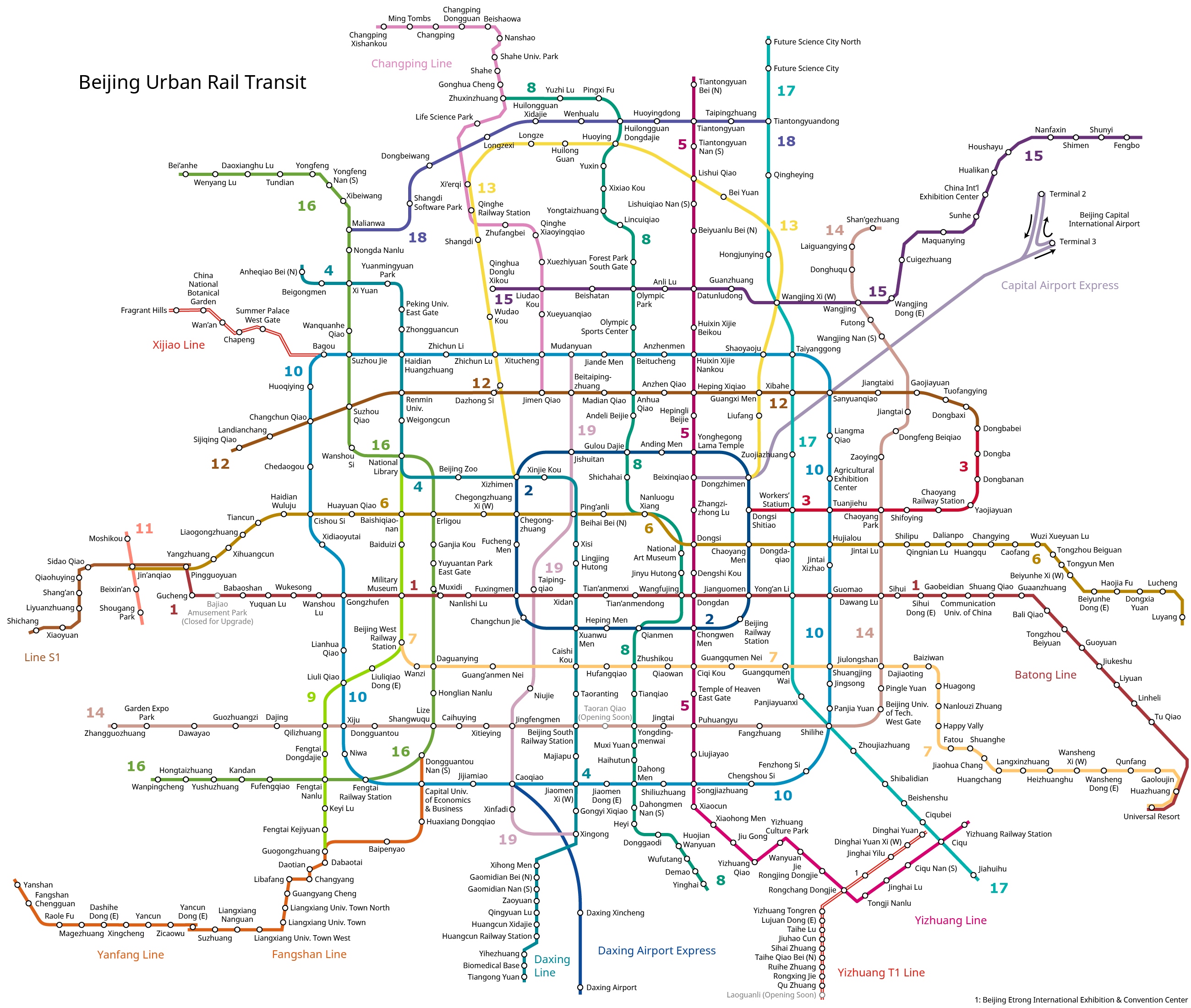
Map of Beijing Subway

The following is a list of stations found within the Beijing Subway.

Stations opened after 2007 have no official station codes.

== Line 1 and Batong Line ==
Since 29 August 2021, through services have operated between Line 1 and Batong Line, so the lines are effectively operated as a single line.

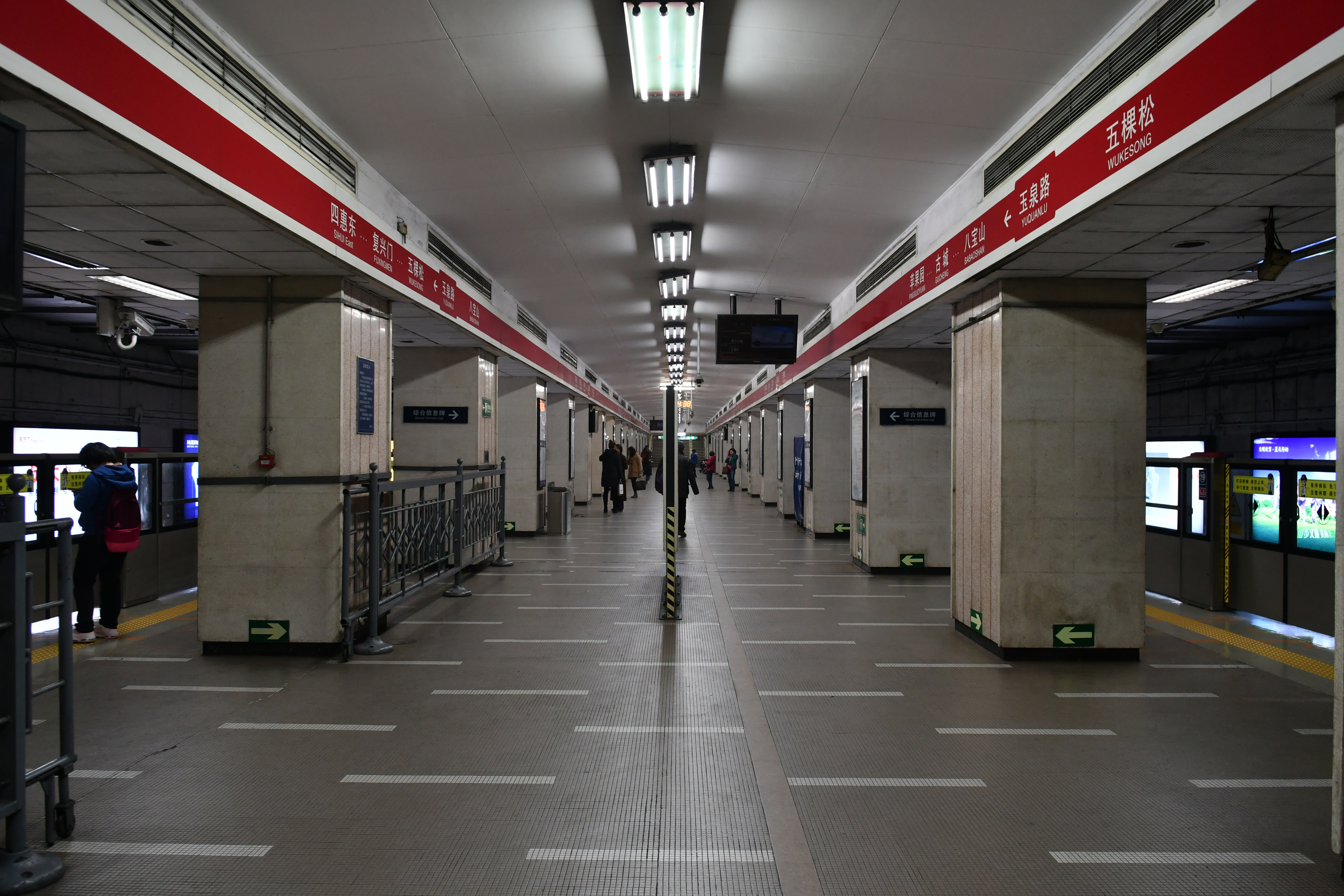
Yuquan Lu station platform

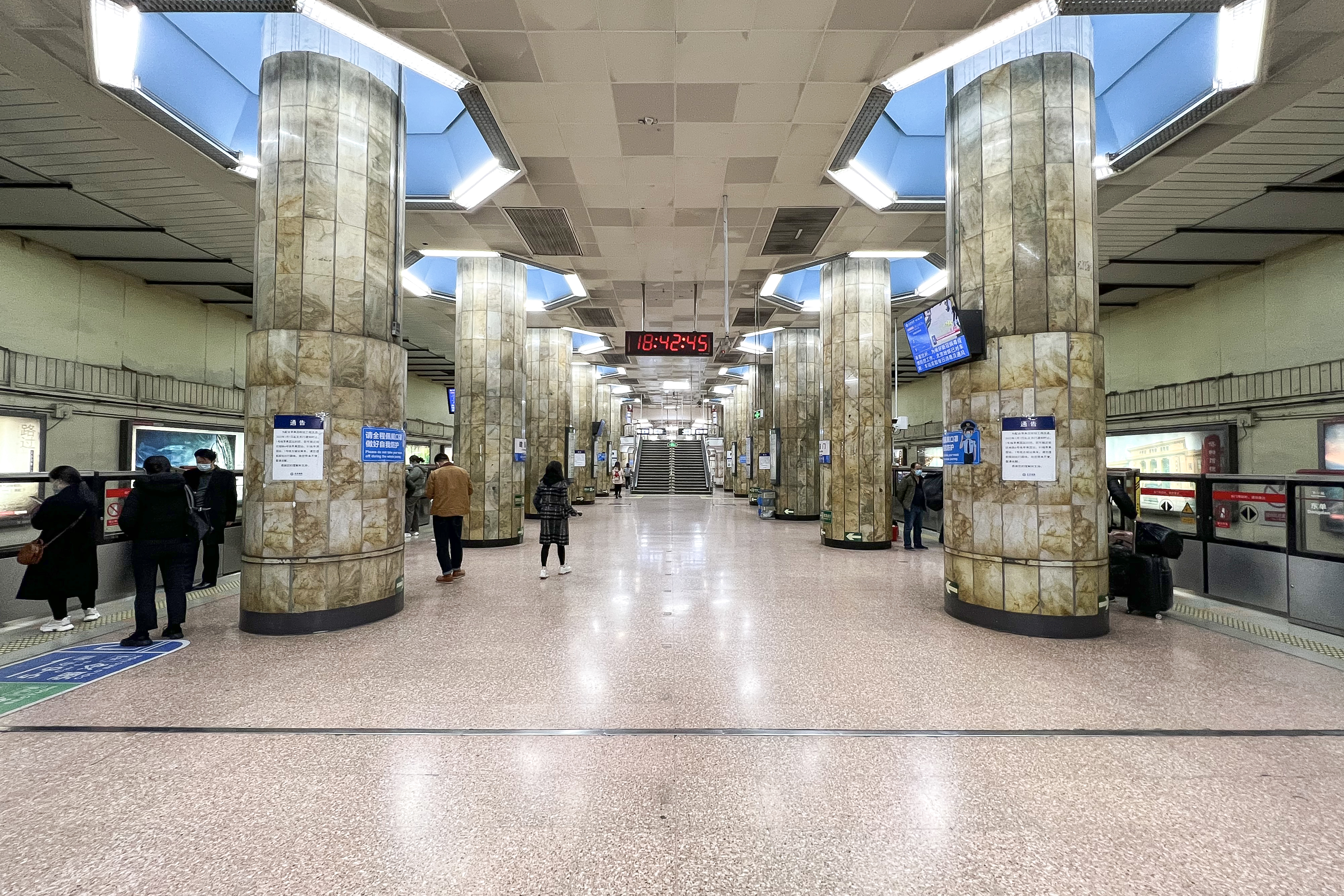
Jianguomen station platform

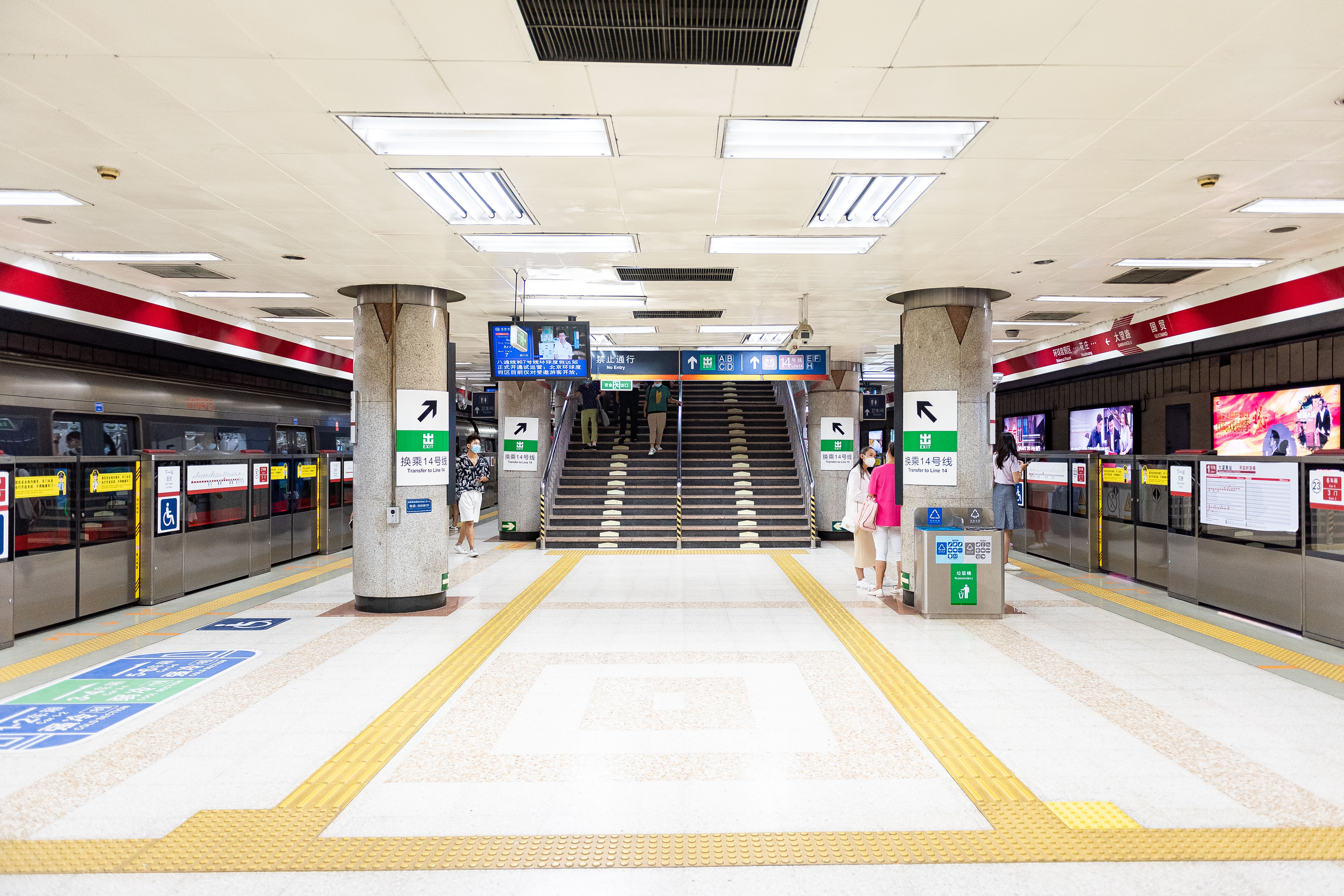
Dawang Lu station platform

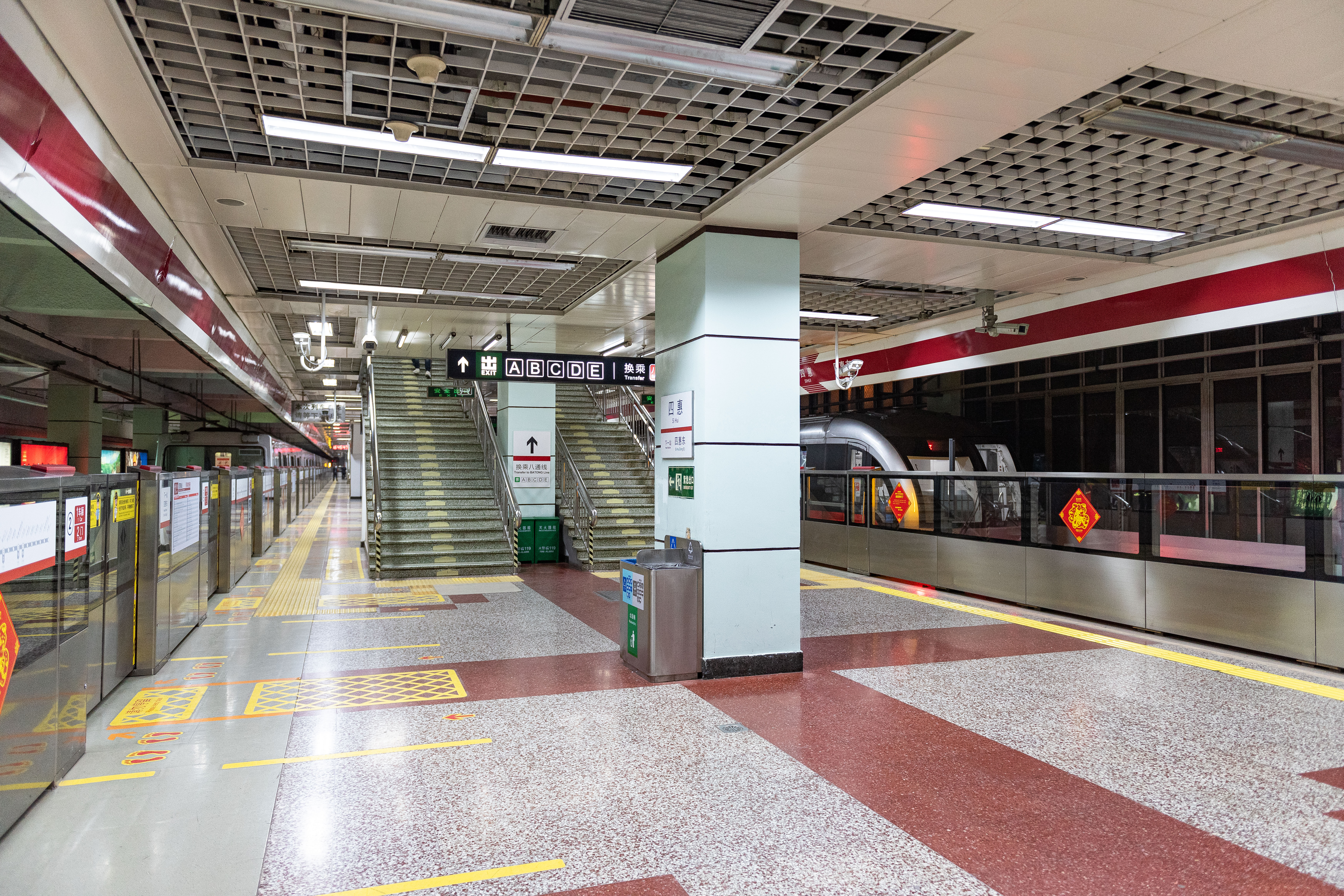
Sihui station platform

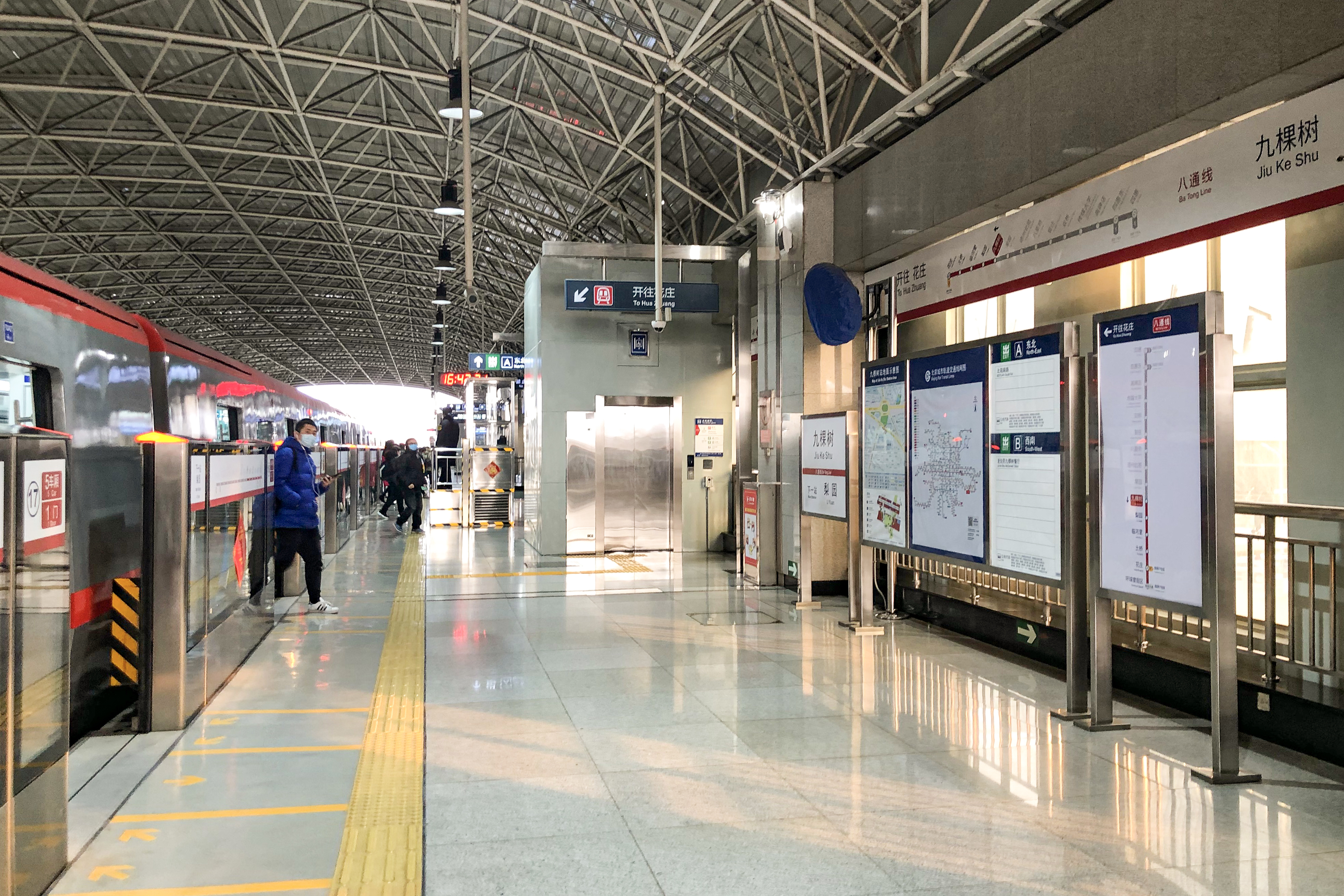
Jiukeshu station eastbound platform

Stations of Line 1 and Batong Line
Code	Station	Chinese name	Location	Transfers	Platform type	Grade	Opened
101	53# (Restricted)	53号	Shijingshan		Split	Underground	Not operational
102	Fushouling (Restricted)	福寿岭	Shijingshan		Side	Underground	Not operational
103	Pingguoyuan	苹果园	Shijingshan	6 S1	Side	Underground	23 April 1973
104	Gucheng	古城	Shijingshan		Side	Underground	7 November 1971
105	Bajiao Amusement Park	八角游乐园	Shijingshan		Side	Underground	7 November 1971
106	Babaoshan	八宝山	Shijingshan		Island	Underground	7 November 1971
107	Yuquan Lu	玉泉路	Shijingshan		Island	Underground	5 August 1971
108	Wukesong	五棵松	Haidian		Island	Underground	5 August 1971
109	Wanshou Lu	万寿路	Haidian		Island	Underground	5 August 1971
110	Gongzhufen	公主坟	Haidian	10	Island	Underground	15 January 1971
111	Military Museum	军事博物馆	Haidian	9	Island	Underground	15 January 1971
112	Muxidi	木樨地	Xicheng	16 (out-of-system interchange)	Island	Underground	15 January 1971
113	Nanlishi Lu	南礼士路	Xicheng		Island	Underground	15 January 1971
114	Fuxingmen	复兴门	Xicheng	2; 19 (Out-of-system interchange via Taipingqiao)	Island	Underground	28 December 1987
115	Xidan	西单	Xicheng	4	Island	Underground	12 December 1992
116	Tian'anmenxi	天安门西	Xicheng		Island	Underground	28 September 1999
117	Tian'anmendong	天安门东	Dongcheng		Island	Underground	28 September 1999
118	Wangfujing	王府井	Dongcheng	8	Island	Underground	28 September 1999
119	Dongdan	东单	Dongcheng	5	Island	Underground	28 September 1999
120	Jianguomen	建国门	Dongcheng	2	Island	Underground	28 September 1999
121	Yong'an Li	永安里	Chaoyang		Island	Underground	28 September 1999
122	Guomao	国贸	Chaoyang	10	Island	Underground	28 September 1999
123	Dawang Lu	大望路	Chaoyang	14	Island	Underground	28 September 1999
124/BT01	Sihui	四惠	Chaoyang		Island	At-grade	28 September 1999
125/BT02	Sihuidong	四惠东	Chaoyang		Side	At-grade	28 September 1999
BT03	Gaobeidian	高碑店	Chaoyang		Side	Elevated	27 December 2003
BT04	Communication Univ. of China	传媒大学	Chaoyang		Side	At-grade	27 December 2003
BT05	Shuangqiao	双桥	Chaoyang		Side	Elevated	27 December 2003
BT06	Guaanzhuang	管庄	Chaoyang		Side	Elevated	27 December 2003
BT07	Baliqiao	八里桥	Chaoyang		Side	Elevated	27 December 2003
BT08	Tongzhou Beiyuan	通州北苑	Tongzhou		Side	Elevated	27 December 2003
BT09	Guoyuan	果园	Tongzhou		Side	Elevated	27 December 2003
BT10	Jiukeshu	九棵树	Tongzhou		Side	Elevated	27 December 2003
BT11	Liyuan	梨园	Tongzhou		Side	Elevated	27 December 2003
BT12	Linheli	临河里	Tongzhou		Side	Elevated	27 December 2003
BT13	Tuqiao	土桥	Tongzhou		Side	Elevated	27 December 2003
— (Note: No official station codes are given after 2007.)	Huazhuang	花庄	Tongzhou	7	Dual-island	Underground	28 December 2019
—	Universal Resort	环球度假区	Tongzhou	7	Dual-island	Underground	26 August 2021

== Line 2 ==
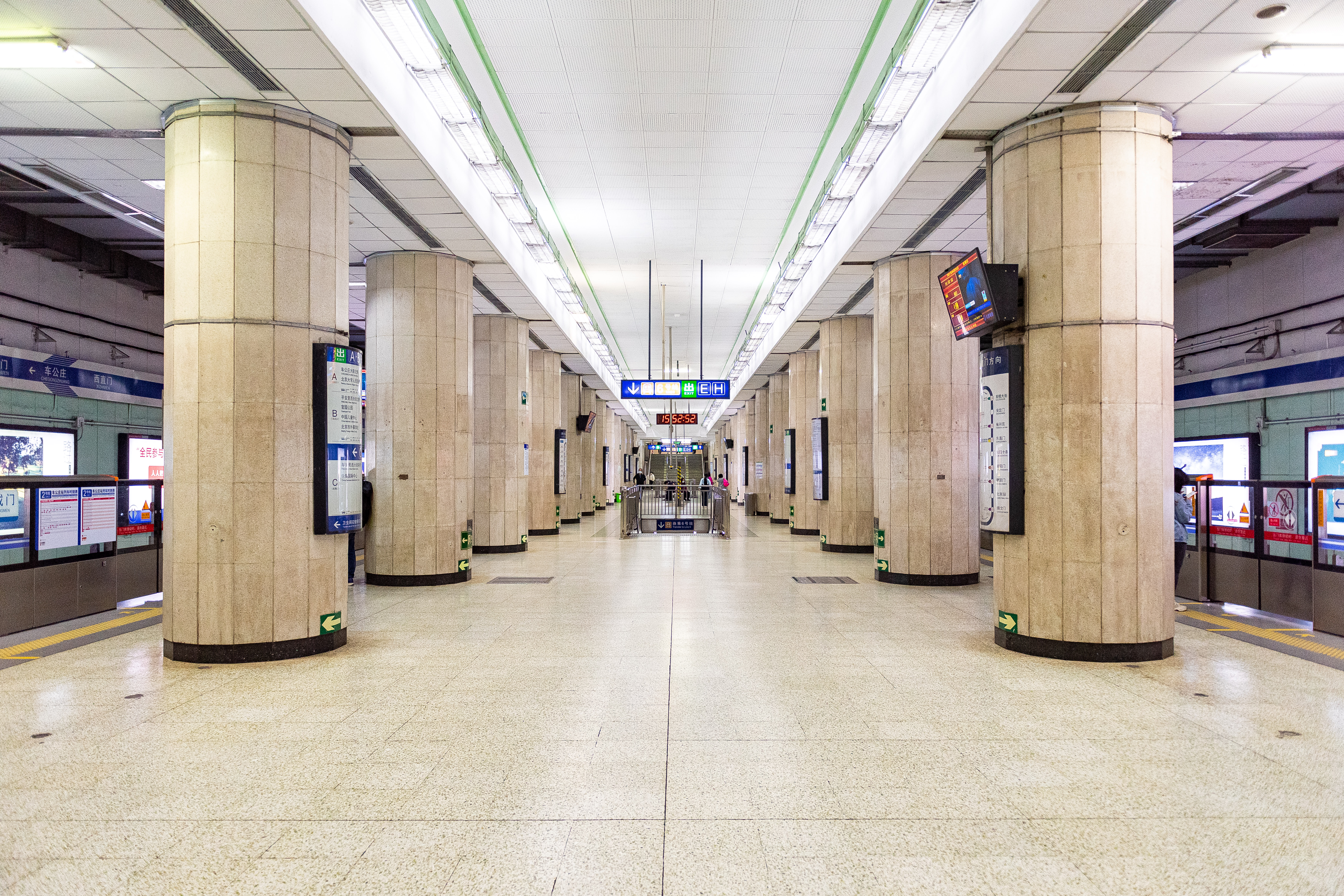
Chegongzhuang station platform

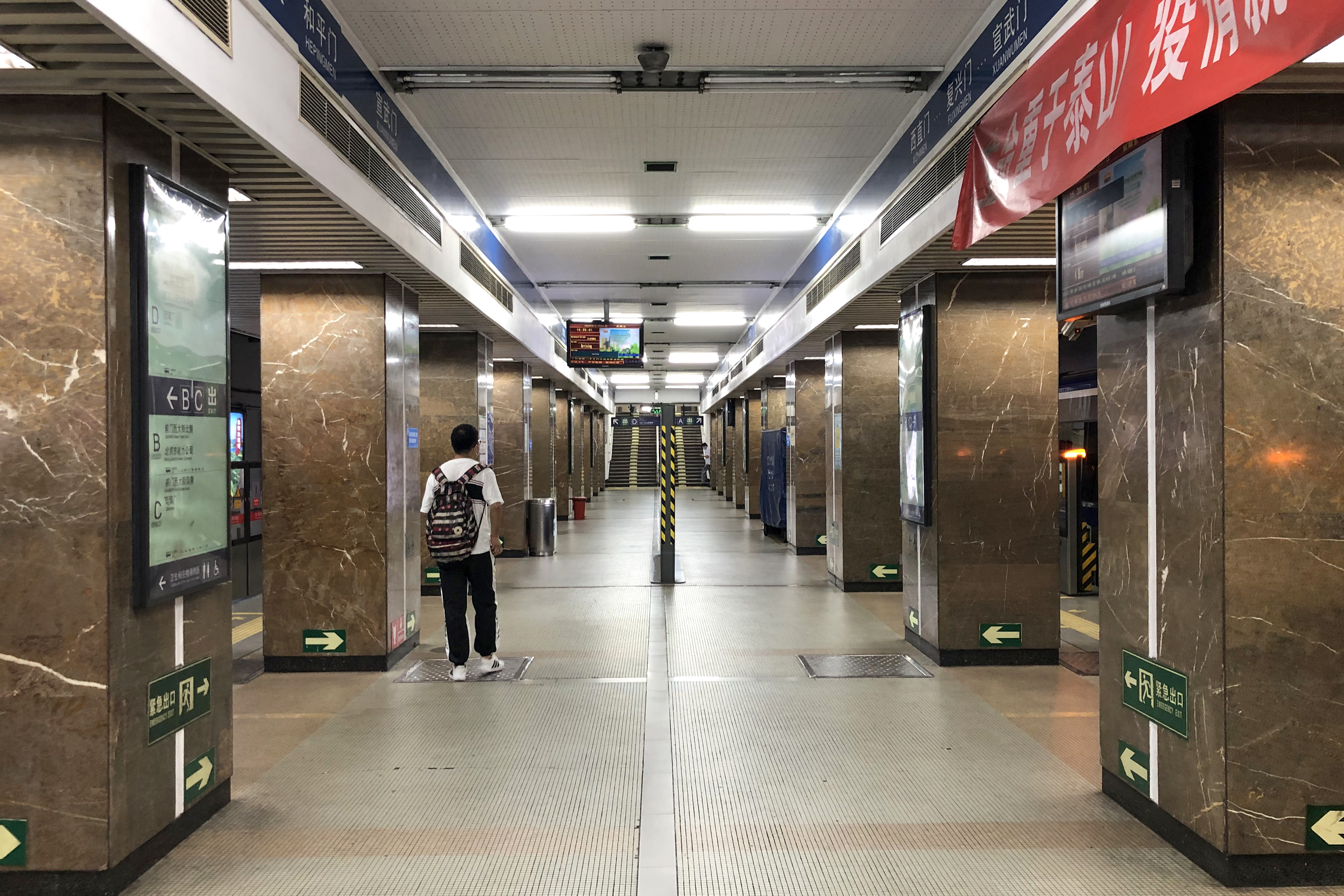
Hepingmen station platform

Stations of Line 2
Code	Station	Chinese name	Location	Transfers	Platform type	Grade	Opened
— ↑ towards Jishuitan ↑ —
201	Xizhimen	西直门	Xicheng	4 13 Huairou–Miyun; Beijing North	Island	Underground	20 September 1984
202	Chegongzhuang	车公庄	Xicheng	6	Island	Underground	20 September 1984
203	Fuchengmen	阜成门	Xicheng		Island	Underground	20 September 1984
204	Fuxingmen	复兴门	Xicheng	1; 19 (Out-of-system interchange via Taipingqiao)	Island	Underground	20 September 1984
205	Changchun Jie	长椿街	Xicheng		Island	Underground	15 January 1971
206	Xuanwumen	宣武门	Xicheng	4	Island	Underground	15 January 1971
207	Hepingmen	和平门	Xicheng		Island	Underground	15 January 1971
208	Qianmen	前门	Dongcheng	8	Island	Underground	15 January 1971
209	Chongwenmen	崇文门	Dongcheng	5	Island	Underground	15 January 1971
210	Beijing railway station	北京站	Dongcheng	Sub-Central; Beijing	Island	Underground	15 January 1971
211	Jianguomen	建国门	Dongcheng/Chaoyang	1	Island	Underground	20 September 1984
212	Chaoyangmen	朝阳门	Dongcheng/Chaoyang	6	Island	Underground	20 September 1984
213	Dongsi Shitiao	东四十条	Dongcheng		Island	Underground	20 September 1984
214	Dongzhimen	东直门	Dongcheng	13 Capital Airport	Island	Underground	20 September 1984
215	Yonghegong Lama Temple	雍和宫	Dongcheng	5	Island	Underground	20 September 1984
216	Andingmen	安定门	Dongcheng		Island	Underground	20 September 1984
217	Gulou Dajie	鼓楼大街	Dongcheng/Xicheng	8	Island	Underground	20 September 1984
218	Jishuitan	积水潭	Xicheng	19	Island	Underground	20 September 1984
— ↓ towards Xizhimen ↓ —

== Line 3 ==
Stations of Line 3
Station	Chinese name	Location	Transfers	Platform type	Grade	Opened
Dongsi Shitiao	东四十条	Dongcheng	2		Underground	15 December 2024
Workers' Stadium	工人体育场	Chaoyang	17		Underground	15 December 2024
Tuanjiehu	团结湖	Chaoyang	10		Underground	15 December 2024
Chaoyang Park	朝阳公园	Chaoyang	14		Underground	15 December 2024
Shifoying	石佛营	Chaoyang			Underground	15 December 2024
Chaoyang railway station	朝阳站	Chaoyang	IFP		Underground	15 December 2024
Yaojiayuan	姚家园	Chaoyang			Underground	15 December 2024
Dongbanan	东坝南	Chaoyang			Underground	15 December 2024
Dongba	东坝	Chaoyang			Underground	15 December 2024
Dongbabei	东坝北	Chaoyang	12		Underground	15 December 2024

== Line 4 and Daxing Line ==
Through services operate on Line 4 and Daxing Line.

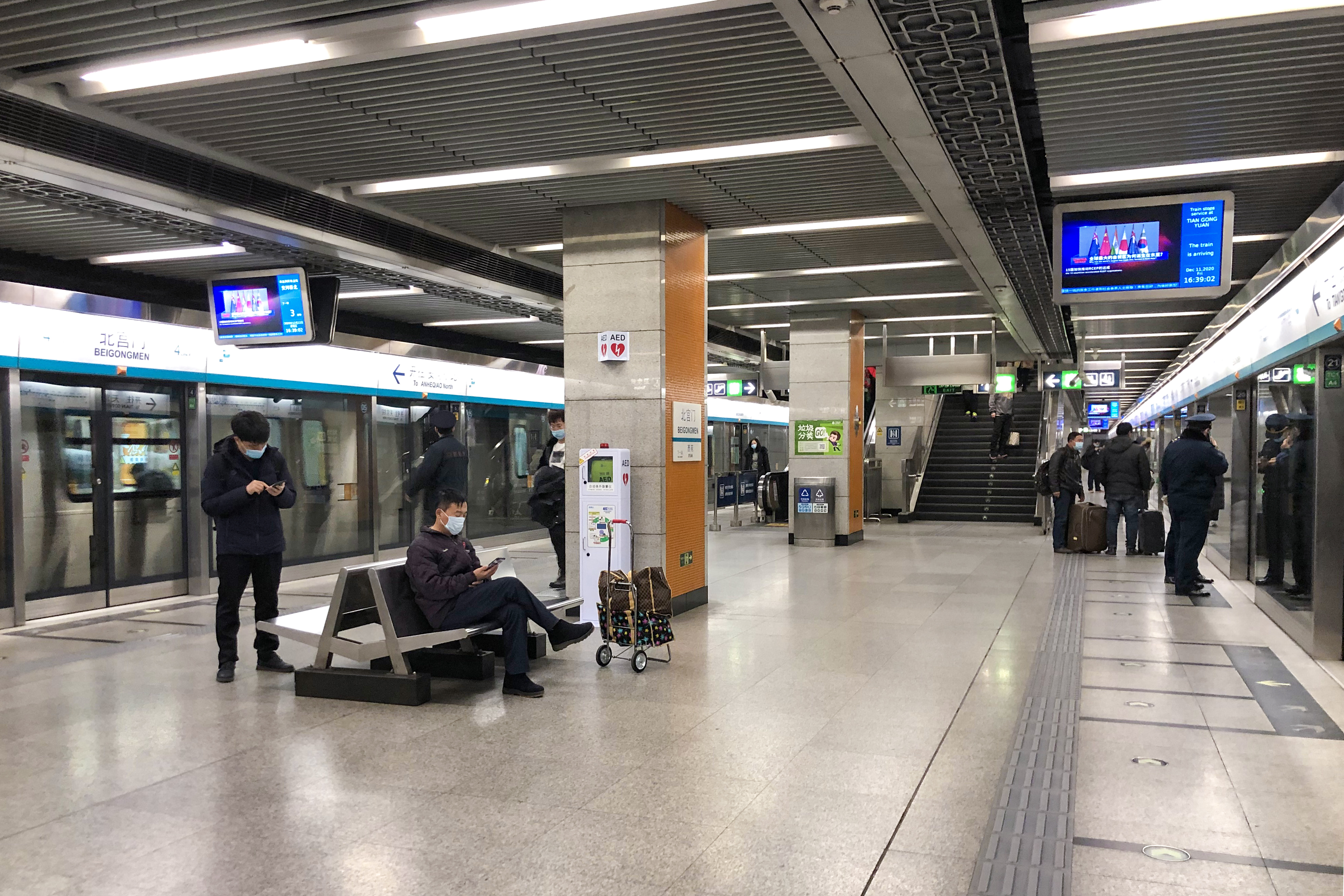
Beigongmen station platform

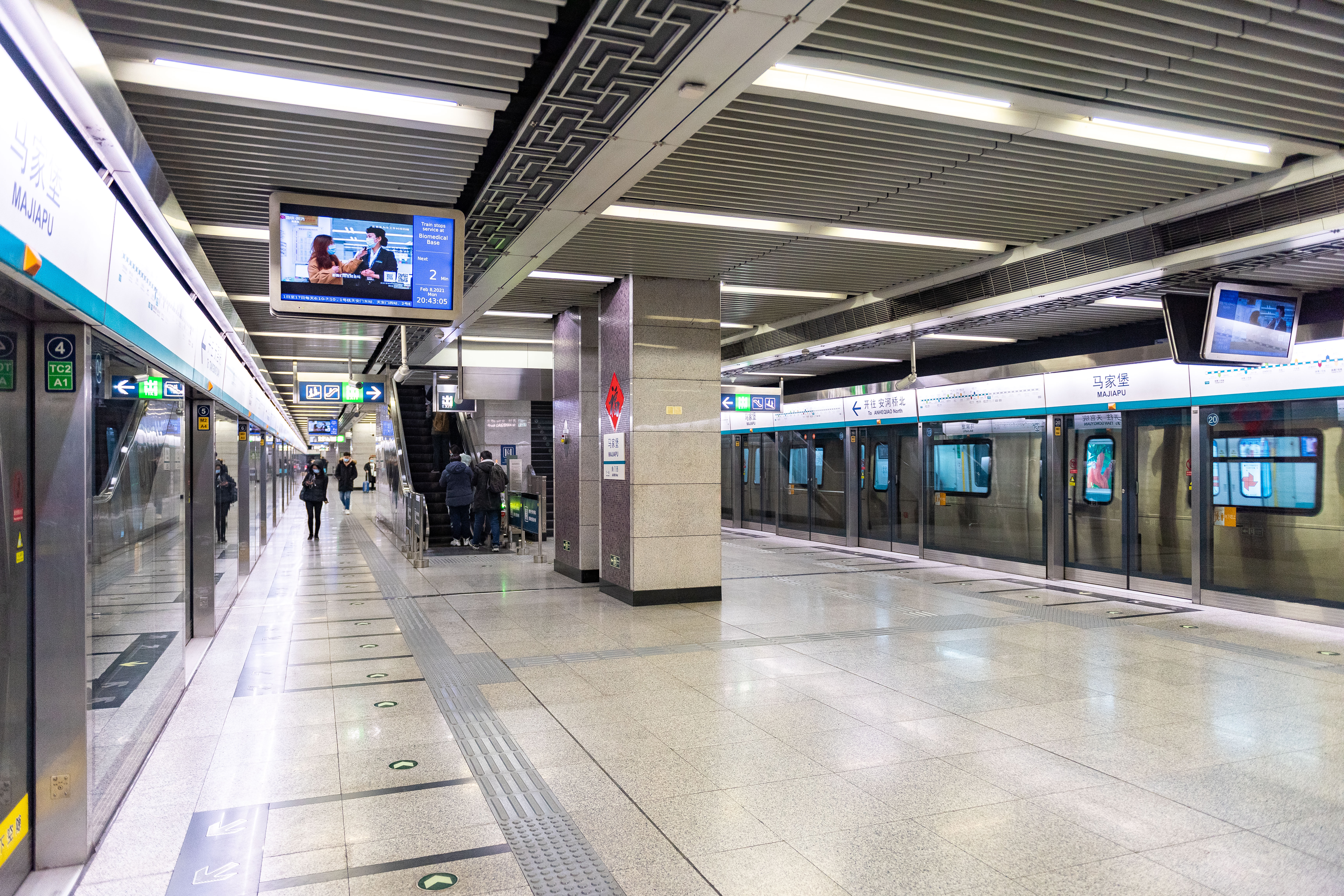
Majiapu station platform

Stations of Line 4
Station	Chinese name	Location	Transfers	Platform type	Grade	Opened
Anheqiaobei	安河桥北	Haidian		Side/island hybrid	At-grade	28 September 2009
Beigongmen	北宫门	Haidian		Island	Underground	28 September 2009
Xiyuan	西苑	Haidian	16	Island	Underground	28 September 2009
Yuanmingyuan Park	圆明园	Haidian		Island	Underground	28 September 2009
Peking Univ. East Gate	北京大学东门	Haidian		Island	Underground	28 September 2009
Zhongguancun	中关村	Haidian		Island	Underground	28 September 2009
Haidian Huangzhuang	海淀黄庄	Haidian	10	Island	Underground	28 September 2009
Renmin Univ.	人民大学	Haidian	12	Island	Underground	28 September 2009
Weigongcun	魏公村	Haidian		Island	Underground	28 September 2009
National Library	国家图书馆	Haidian	9 16	Dual-island	Underground	28 September 2009
Beijing Zoo	动物园	Haidian		Island	Underground	28 September 2009
Xizhimen	西直门	Xicheng	2 13 Huairou–Miyun; Beijing North	Island	Underground	28 September 2009
Xinjiekou	新街口	Xicheng		Island	Underground	28 September 2009
Ping'anli	平安里	Xicheng	6 19	Island	Underground	28 September 2009
Xisi	西四	Xicheng		Island	Underground	28 September 2009
Lingjing Hutong	灵境胡同	Xicheng		Island	Underground	28 September 2009
Xidan	西单	Xicheng	1	Island	Underground	28 September 2009
Xuanwumen	宣武门	Xicheng	2	Island	Underground	28 September 2009
Caishikou	菜市口	Xicheng	7	Island	Underground	28 September 2009
Taoranting	陶然亭	Xicheng		Island	Underground	28 September 2009
Beijing South railway station	北京南站	Fengtai	14; Beijing South	Island	Underground	28 September 2009
Majiapu	马家堡	Fengtai		Island	Underground	28 September 2009
Jiaomenxi	角门西	Fengtai	10	Island	Underground	28 September 2009
Gongyi Xiqiao	公益西桥	Fengtai		Dual-island	Underground	28 September 2009
Xingong	新宫	Fengtai	19	Dual-island	Underground	30 December 2010
Xihongmen	西红门	Daxing		Side	Elevated	30 December 2010
Gaomidianbei	高米店北	Daxing		Island	Underground	30 December 2010
Gaomidiannan	高米店南	Daxing		Island	Underground	30 December 2010
Zaoyuan	枣园	Daxing		Island	Underground	30 December 2010
Qingyuan Lu	清源路	Daxing		Island	Underground	30 December 2010
Huangcun Xidajie	黄村西大街	Daxing		Island	Underground	30 December 2010
Huangcun railway station	黄村火车站	Daxing	Huangcun; Beijing Daxing	Island	Underground	30 December 2010
Yihezhuang	义和庄	Daxing		Island	Underground	30 December 2010
Biomedical Base	生物医药基地	Daxing		Island	Underground	30 December 2010
Tiangongyuan	天宫院	Daxing		Island	Underground	30 December 2010

== Line 5 ==
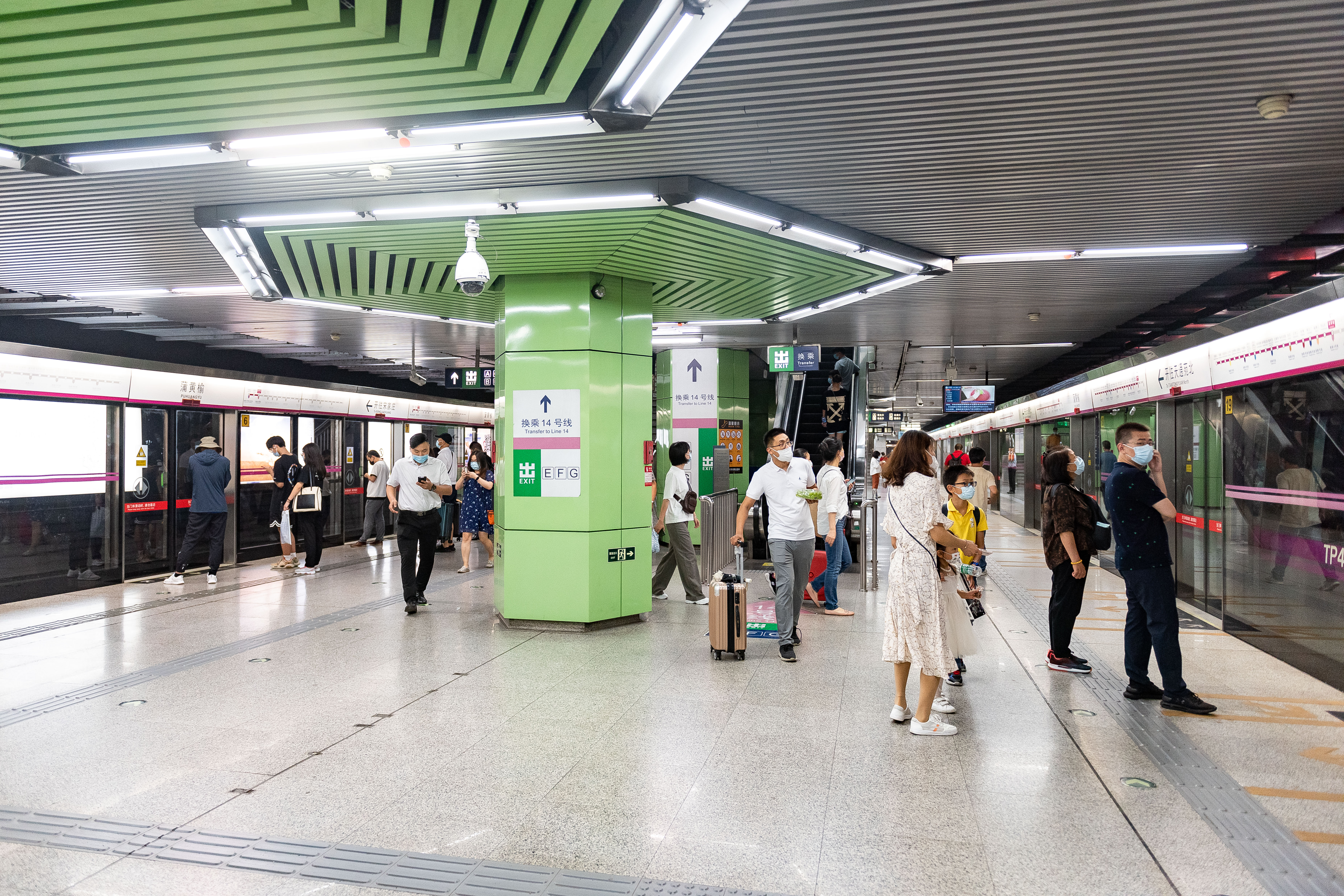
Puhuangyu station platform

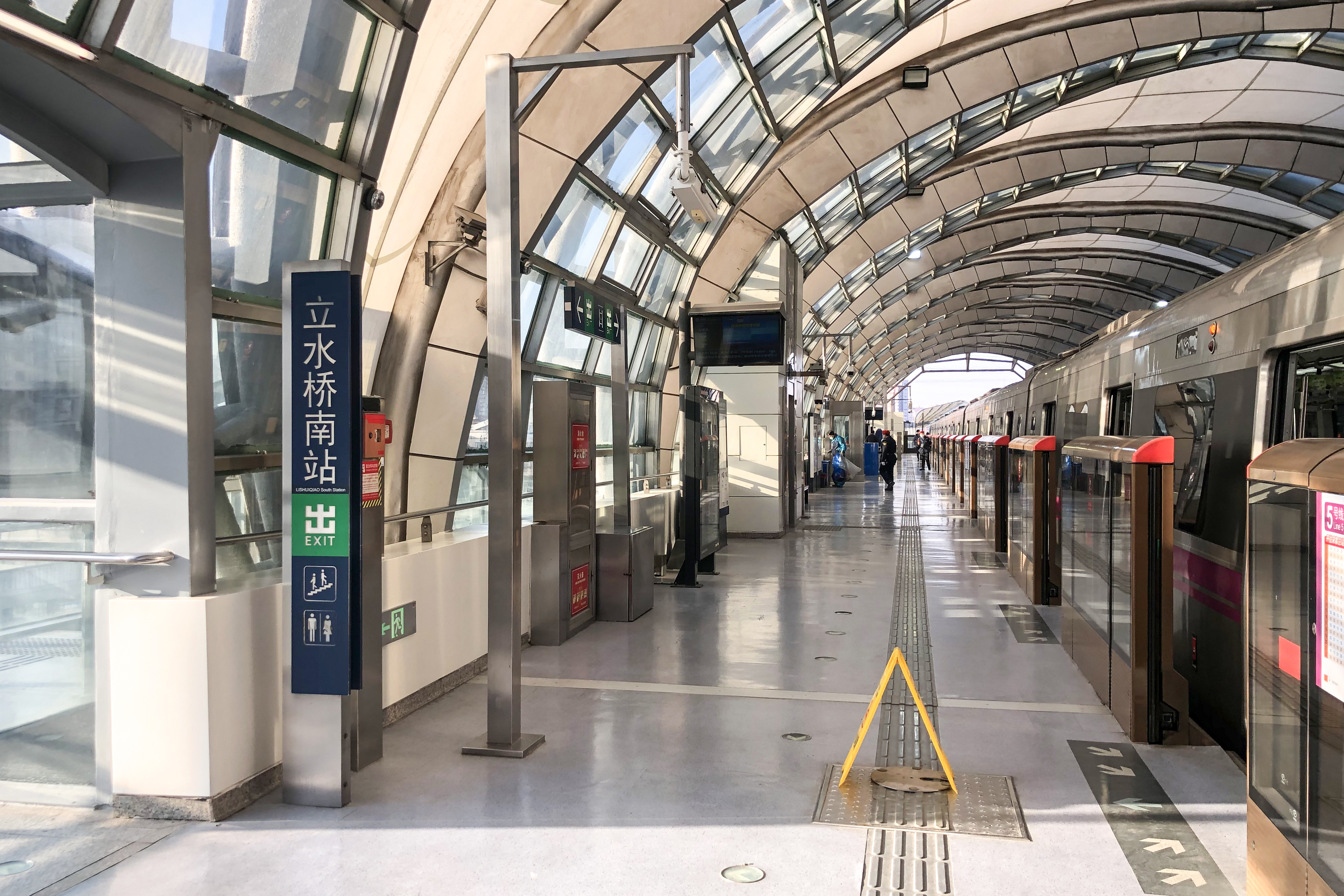
Liushuiqiaonan station southbound platform

Stations of Line 5
Station	Chinese name	Location	Transfers	Platform type	Grade	Opened
Songjiazhuang	宋家庄	Fengtai	Yizhuang 10	Side	Underground	7 October 2007
Liujiayao	刘家窑	Fengtai		Island	Underground	7 October 2007
Puhuangyu	蒲黄榆	Fengtai	14	Island	Underground	7 October 2007
Temple of Heaven East Gate	天坛东门	Dongcheng		Island	Underground	7 October 2007
Ciqikou	磁器口	Dongcheng	7	Island	Underground	7 October 2007
Chongwenmen	崇文门	Dongcheng	2	Island	Underground	7 October 2007
Dongdan	东单	Dongcheng	1	Island	Underground	7 October 2007
Dengshikou	灯市口	Dongcheng		Island	Underground	7 October 2007
Dongsi	东四	Dongcheng	6	Island	Underground	7 October 2007
Zhangzizhong Lu	张自忠路	Dongcheng		Island	Underground	7 October 2007
Beixinqiao	北新桥	Dongcheng	Capital Airport	Island	Underground	7 October 2007
Yonghegong Lama Temple	雍和宫	Dongcheng	2	Island	Underground	7 October 2007
Hepingli Beijie	和平里北街	Dongcheng		Island	Underground	7 October 2007
Heping Xiqiao	和平西桥	Chaoyang	12	Island	Underground	7 October 2007
Huixin Xijie Nankou	惠新西街南口	Chaoyang	10	Island	Underground	7 October 2007
Huixin Xijie Beikou	惠新西街北口	Chaoyang		Side	Underground	7 October 2007
Datunludong	大屯路东	Chaoyang	15	Side	Elevated	7 October 2007
Beiyuanlubei	北苑路北	Chaoyang		Side	Elevated	7 October 2007
Lishuiqiaonan	立水桥南	Chaoyang		Side	Elevated	7 October 2007
Lishuiqiao	立水桥	Chaoyang	13	Side	At-grade	7 October 2007
Tiantongyuannan	天通苑南	Changping		Side	Elevated	7 October 2007
Tiantongyuan	天通苑	Changping		Side	Elevated	7 October 2007
Tiantongyuanbei	天通苑北	Changping		Side	Elevated	7 October 2007

== Line 6 ==
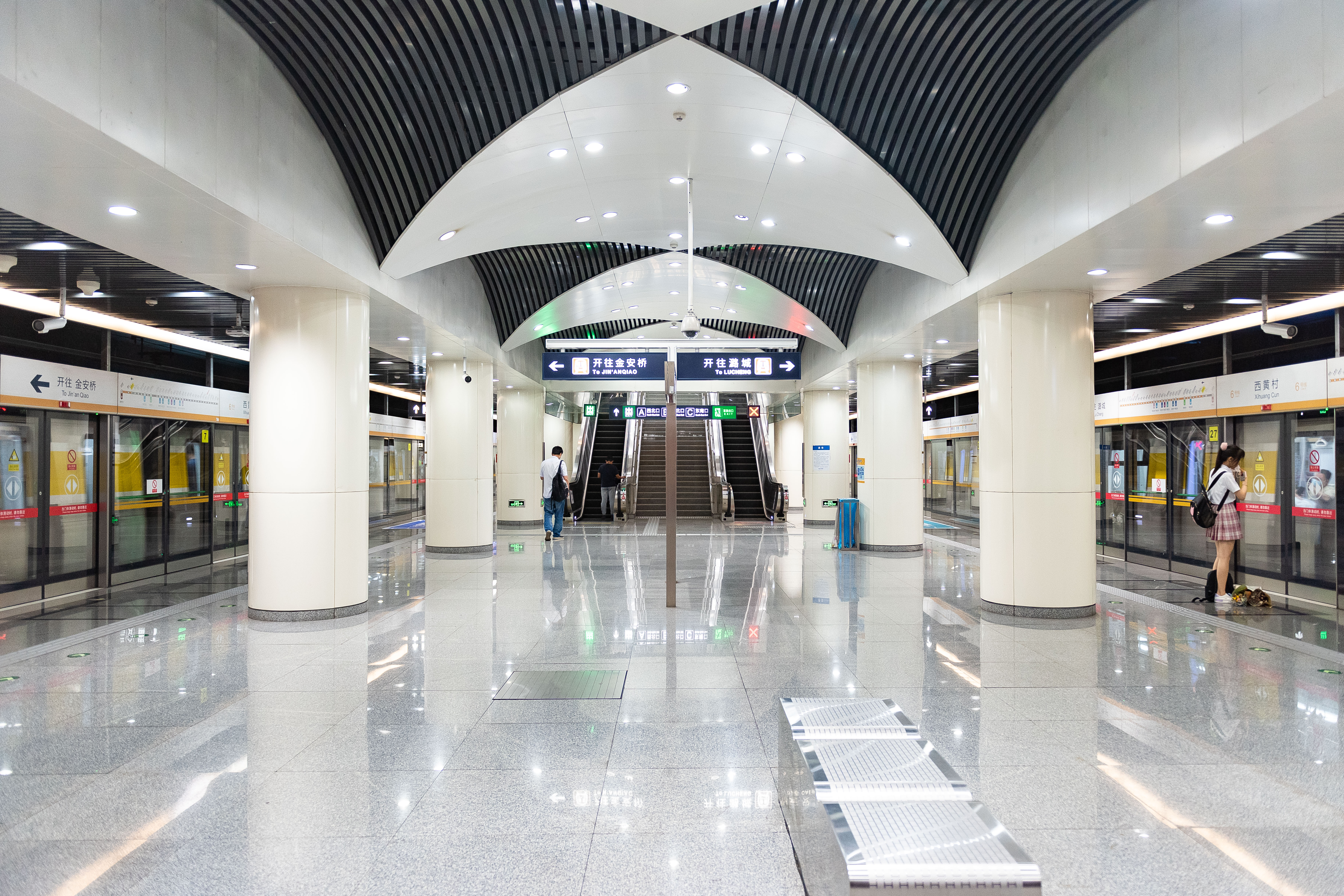
Xihuangcun station platform

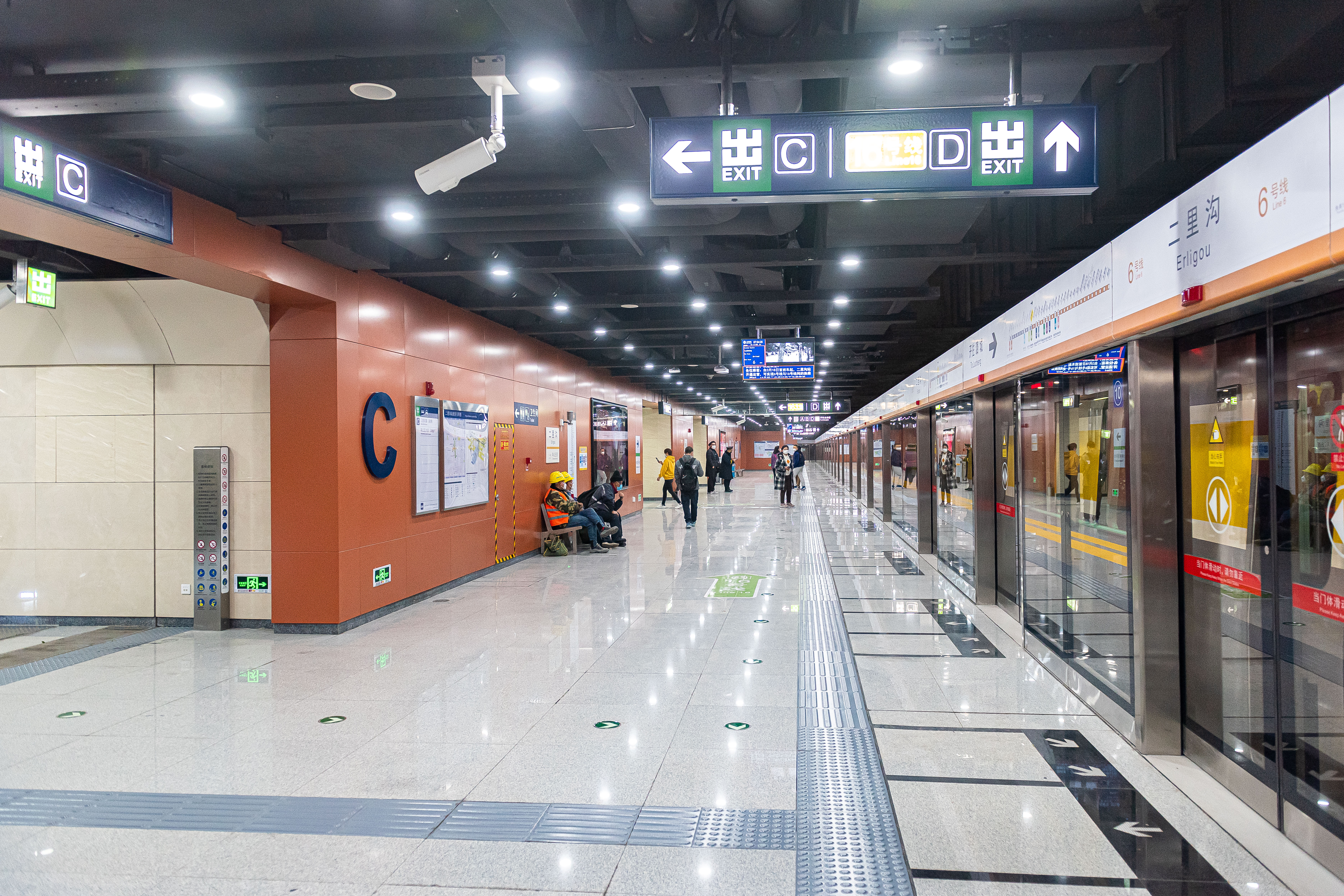
Erligou station eastbound platform

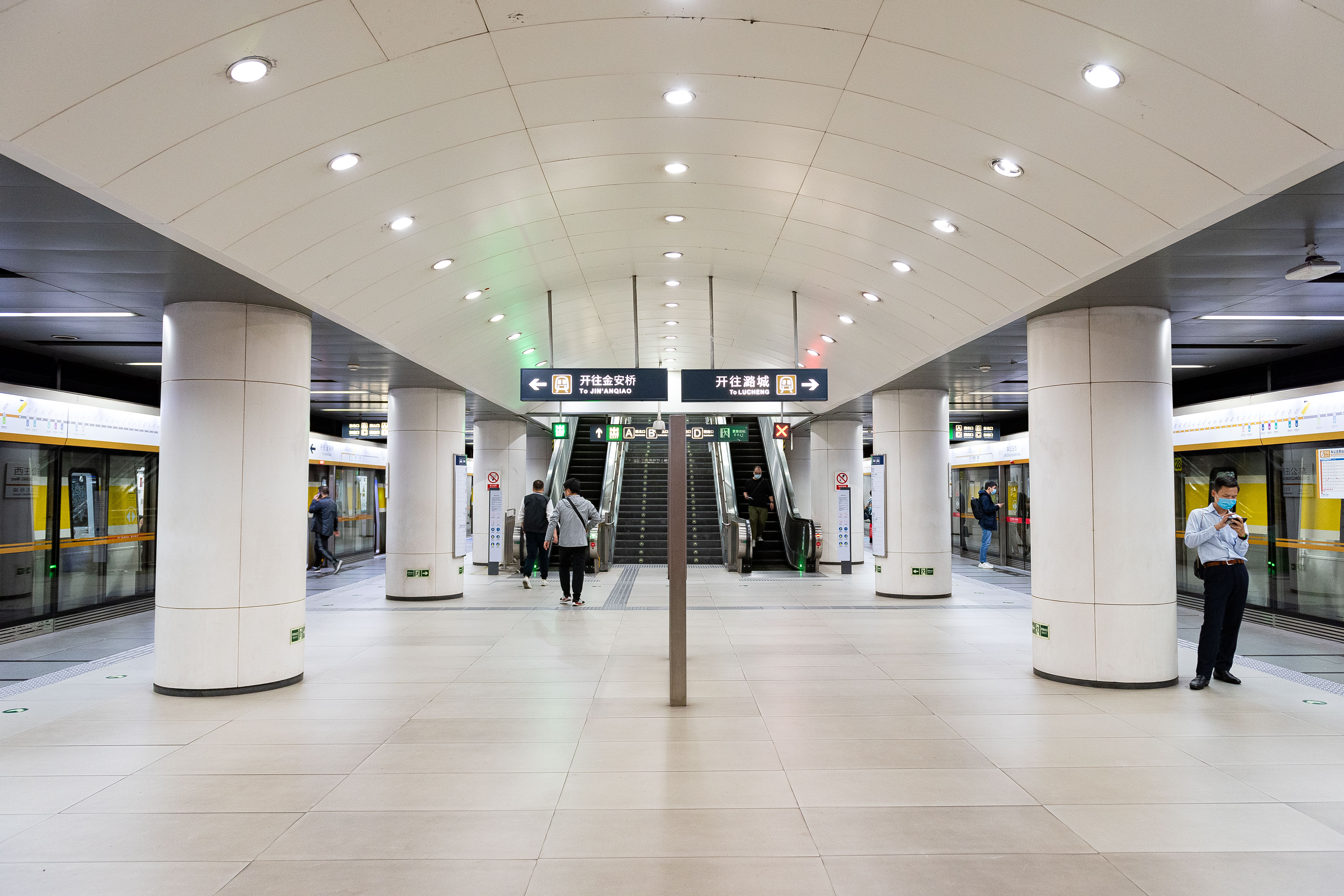
Chegongzhuangxi station platform

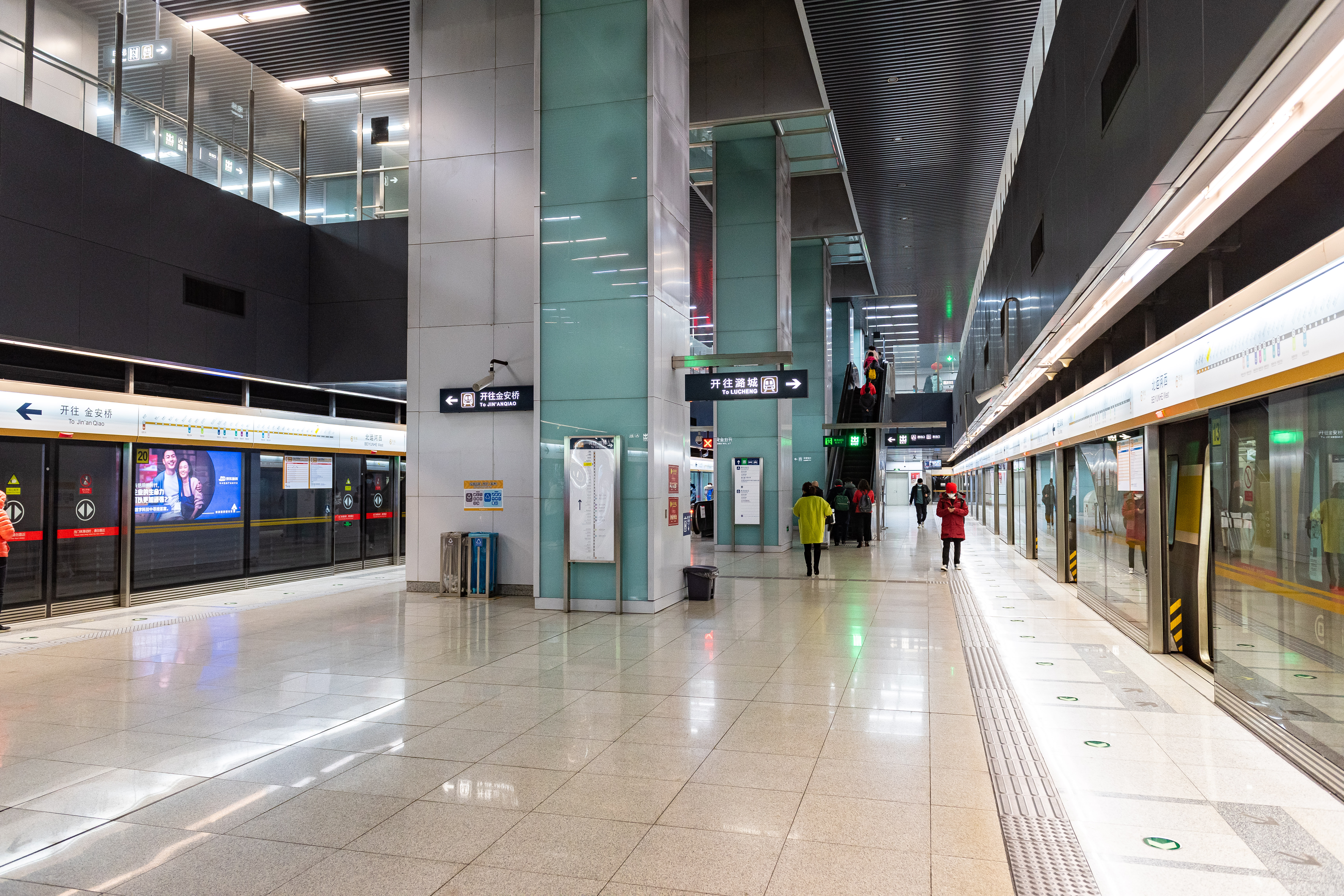
Beiyunhexi station platform

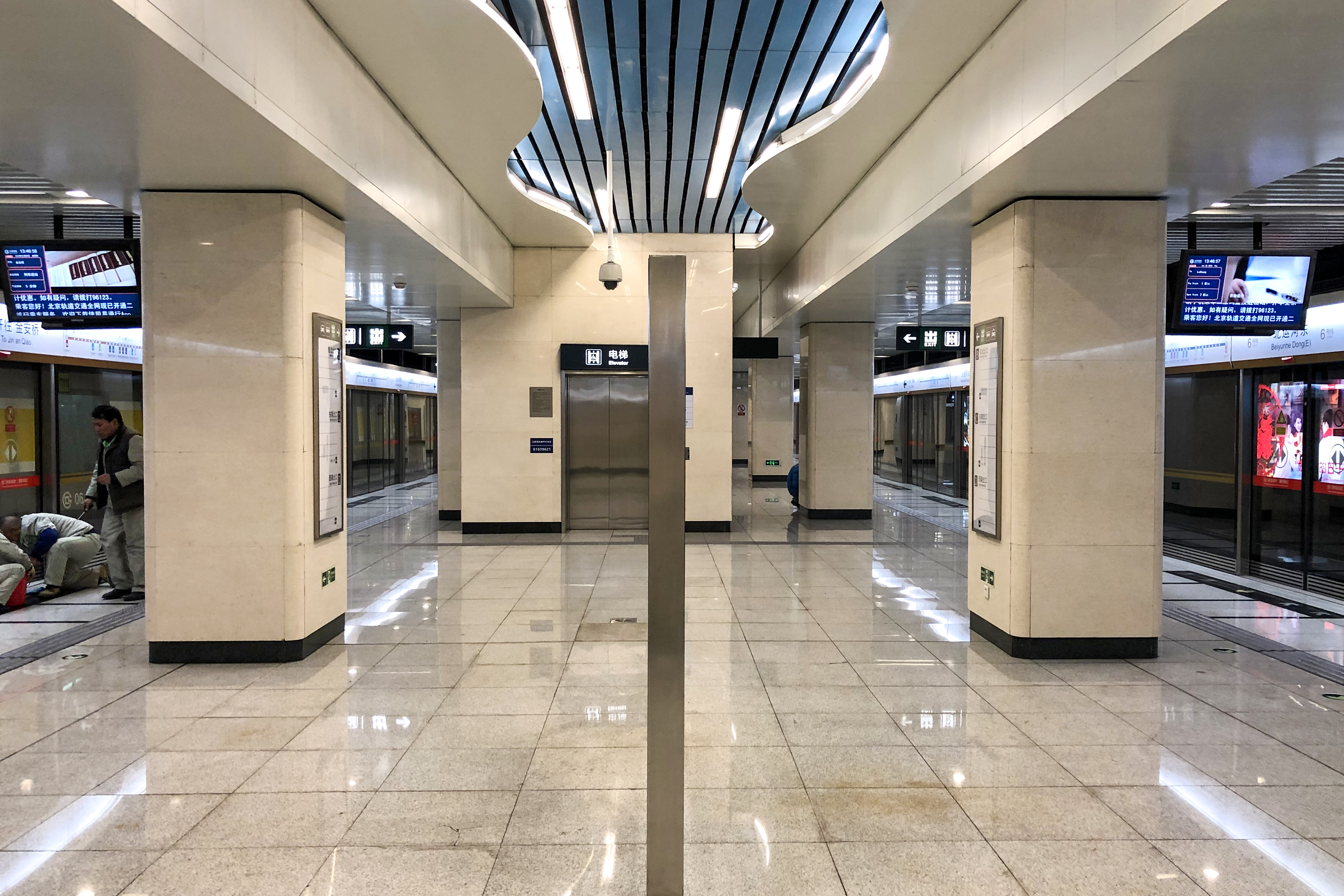
Beiyunhedong station platform

Stations of Line 6
Station	Chinese name	Location	Transfers	Platform type	Grade	Opened
Jin'anqiao	金安桥	Shijingshan	11 S1	Island	Underground	30 December 2018
Pingguoyuan	苹果园	Shijingshan	S1	Island	Underground	31 December 2021
Yangzhuang	杨庄	Shijingshan		Island	Underground	30 December 2018
Xihuangcun	西黄村	Shijingshan		Island	Underground	30 December 2018
Liaogongzhuang	廖公庄	Haidian		Island	Underground	30 December 2018
Tiancun	田村	Haidian		Island	Underground	30 December 2018
Haidian Wuluju	海淀五路居	Haidian		Island	Underground	30 December 2012
Cishousi	慈寿寺	Haidian	10	Island	Underground	30 December 2012
Huayuanqiao	花园桥	Haidian		Island	Underground	30 December 2012
Baishiqiaonan	白石桥南	Haidian	9	Island	Underground	30 December 2012
Erligou	二里沟	Haidian/Xicheng	16	Side	Underground	18 March 2023
Chegongzhuangxi	车公庄西	Xicheng		Split	Underground	30 December 2012
Chegongzhuang	车公庄	Xicheng	2	Split	Underground	30 December 2012
Ping'anli	平安里	Xicheng	4 19	Island	Underground	30 December 2012
Beihaibei	北海北	Xicheng		Island	Underground	30 December 2012
Nanluogu Xiang	南锣鼓巷	Dongcheng	8	Split	Underground	30 December 2012
Dongsi	东四	Dongcheng	5	Island	Underground	30 December 2012
Chaoyangmen	朝阳门	Dongcheng/Chaoyang	2	Island	Underground	30 December 2012
Dongdaqiao	东大桥	Chaoyang		Island	Underground	30 December 2012
Hujialou	呼家楼	Chaoyang	10	Side	Underground	30 December 2012
Jintai Lu	金台路	Chaoyang	14	Island	Underground	30 December 2012
Shilipu	十里堡	Chaoyang		Island	Underground	30 December 2012
Qingnian Lu	青年路	Chaoyang		Island	Underground	30 December 2012
Dalianpo	褡裢坡	Chaoyang		Island	Underground	30 December 2012
Huangqu	黄渠	Chaoyang		Island	Underground	30 December 2012
Changying	常营	Chaoyang		Dual-Island	Underground	30 December 2012
Caofang	草房	Chaoyang		Island	Underground	30 December 2012
Wuzi Xueyuan Lu	物资学院路	Tongzhou		Island	Underground	28 December 2014
Tongzhou Beiguan	通州北关	Tongzhou		Island	Underground	28 December 2014
Tongyunmen	通运门	Tongzhou		Dual-Island	Underground	30 July 2026
Beiyunhexi	北运河西	Tongzhou		Island	Underground	28 December 2014
Beiyunhedong	北运河东	Tongzhou		Island	Underground	30 December 2018
Haojiafu	郝家府	Tongzhou		Island	Underground	28 December 2014
Dongxiayuan	东夏园	Tongzhou		Island	Underground	28 December 2014
Lucheng	潞城	Tongzhou		Island	Underground	28 December 2014

== Line 7 ==
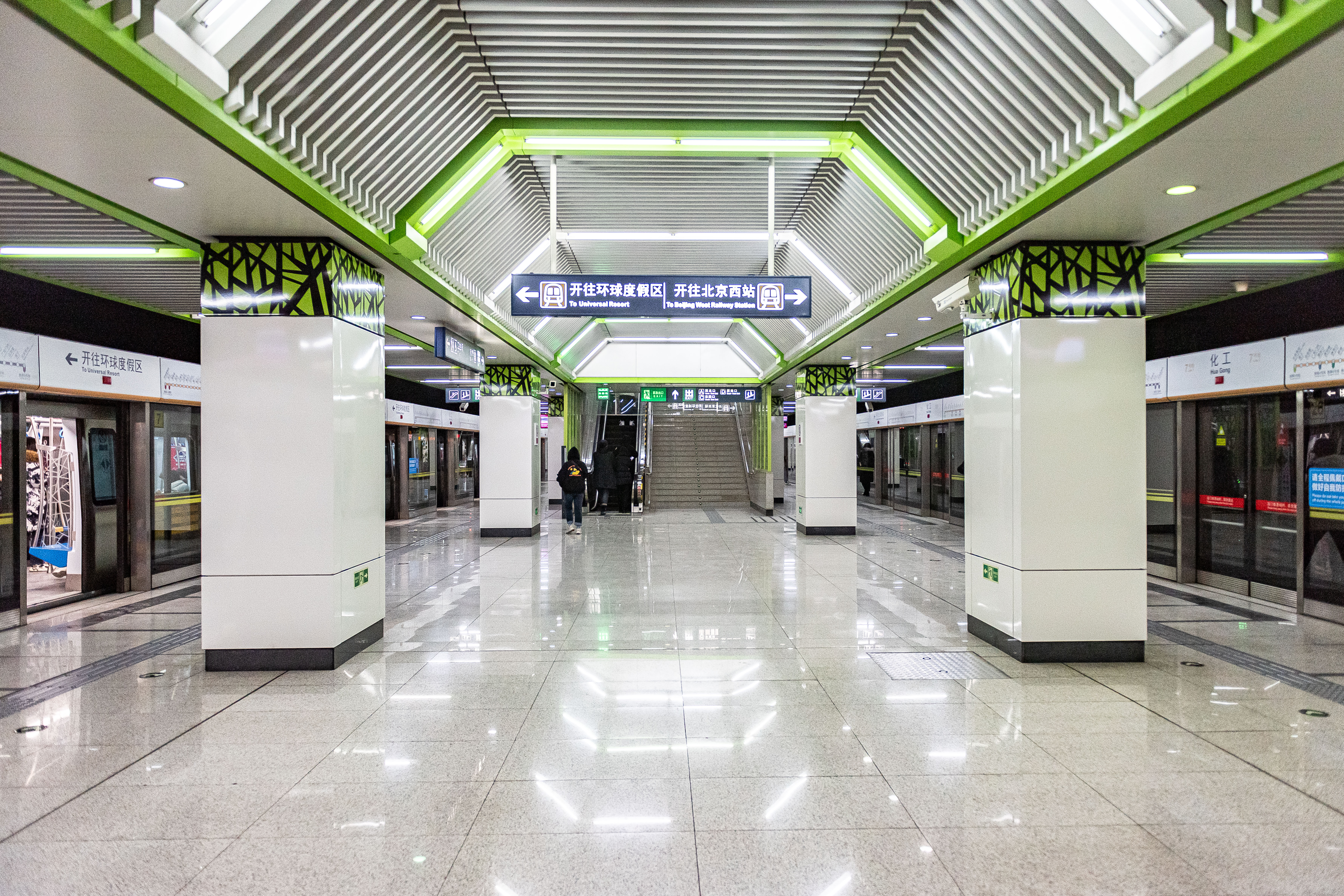
Huagong station platform

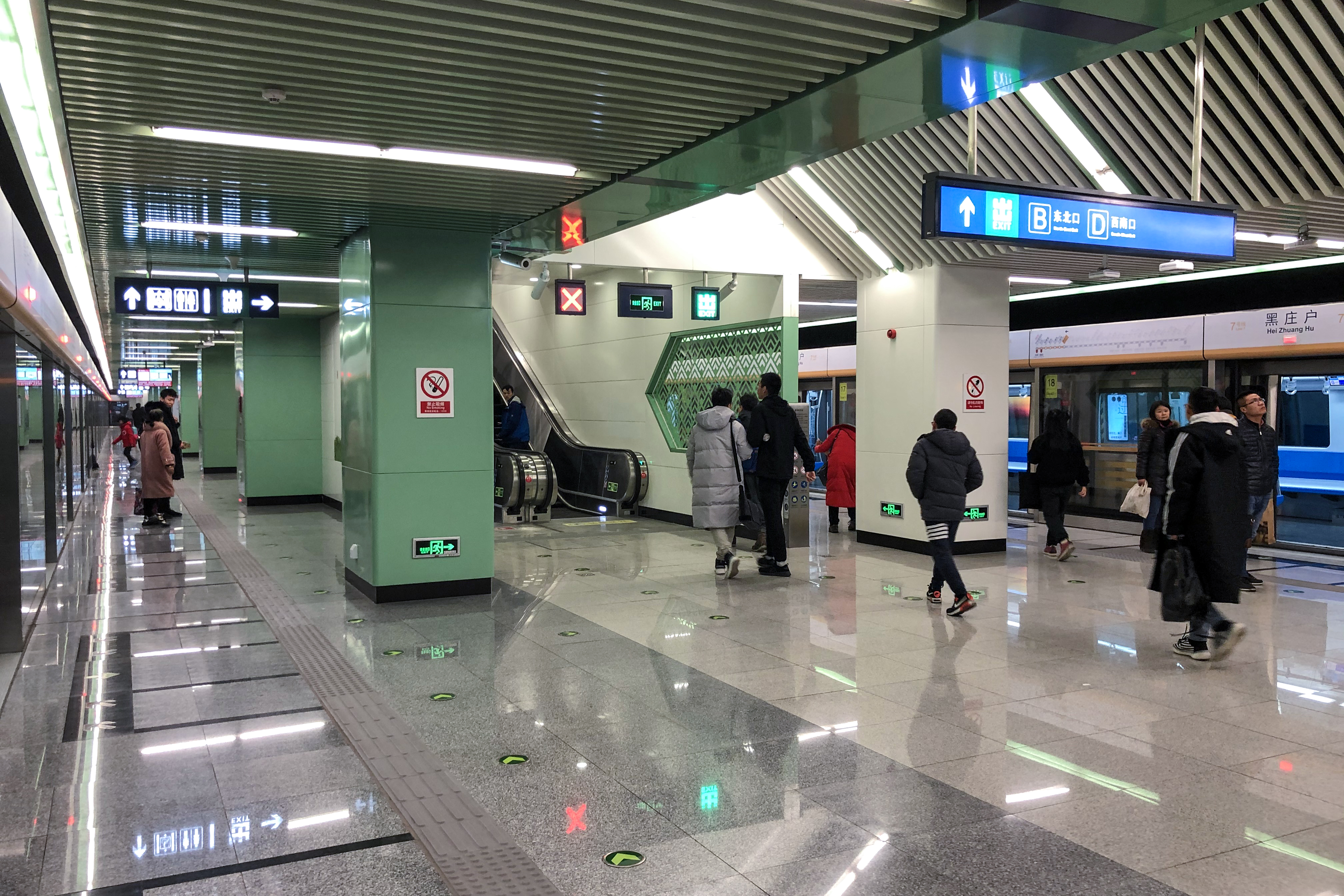
Heizhuanghu station platform

Stations of Line 7
Station	Chinese name	Location	Transfers	Platform type	Grade	Opened
Beijing West railway station	北京西站	Fengtai	9 Sub-Central Beijing West	Dual-Island	Underground	28 December 2014
Wanzi	湾子	Xicheng		Side	Underground	28 December 2014
Daguanying	达官营	Xicheng	16	Island	Underground	28 December 2014
Guang'anmennei	广安门内	Xicheng	19 (Out-of-system interchange via Niujie)	Island	Underground	28 December 2014
Caishikou	菜市口	Xicheng	4	Island	Underground	28 December 2014
Hufangqiao	虎坊桥	Xicheng		Island	Underground	28 December 2014
Zhushikou	珠市口	Dongcheng/Xicheng	8	Island	Underground	28 December 2014
Qiaowan	桥湾	Dongcheng		Island	Underground	28 December 2014
Ciqikou	磁器口	Dongcheng	5	Island	Underground	28 December 2014
Guangqumennei	广渠门内	Dongcheng		Island	Underground	28 December 2014
Guangqumenwai	广渠门外	Dongcheng/Chaoyang		Island	Underground	28 December 2014
Shuangjing	双井	Chaoyang	10	Island	Underground	28 December 2019
Jiulongshan	九龙山	Chaoyang	14	Island	Underground	28 December 2014
Dajiaoting	大郊亭	Chaoyang		Island	Underground	28 December 2014
Baiziwan	百子湾	Chaoyang		Island	Underground	28 December 2014
Huagong	化工	Chaoyang		Island	Underground	28 December 2014
Nanlouzizhuang	南楼梓庄	Chaoyang		Island	Underground	28 December 2014
Happy Valley	欢乐谷景区	Chaoyang		Island	Underground	28 December 2014
Fatou	垡头	Chaoyang		Island	Underground	30 December 2018
Shuanghe	双合	Chaoyang		Dual-Island	Underground	28 December 2014
Jiaohuachang	焦化厂	Chaoyang		Side	Underground	28 December 2014
Huangchang	黄厂	Chaoyang		Island	Underground	28 December 2019
Langxinzhuang	郎辛庄	Chaoyang		Island	Underground	28 December 2019
Heizhuanghu	黑庄户	Chaoyang		Island	Underground	28 December 2019
Wanshengxi	万盛西	Tongzhou		Island	Underground	28 December 2019
Wanshengdong	万盛东	Tongzhou		Island	Underground	28 December 2019
Qunfang	群芳	Tongzhou		Island	Underground	28 December 2019
Gaoloujin	高楼金	Tongzhou		Dual-Island	Underground	28 December 2019
Huazhuang	花庄	Tongzhou	Batong	Dual-Island	Underground	28 December 2019
Universal Resort	环球度假区	Tongzhou	Batong	Dual-Island	Underground	26 August 2021

== Line 8 ==
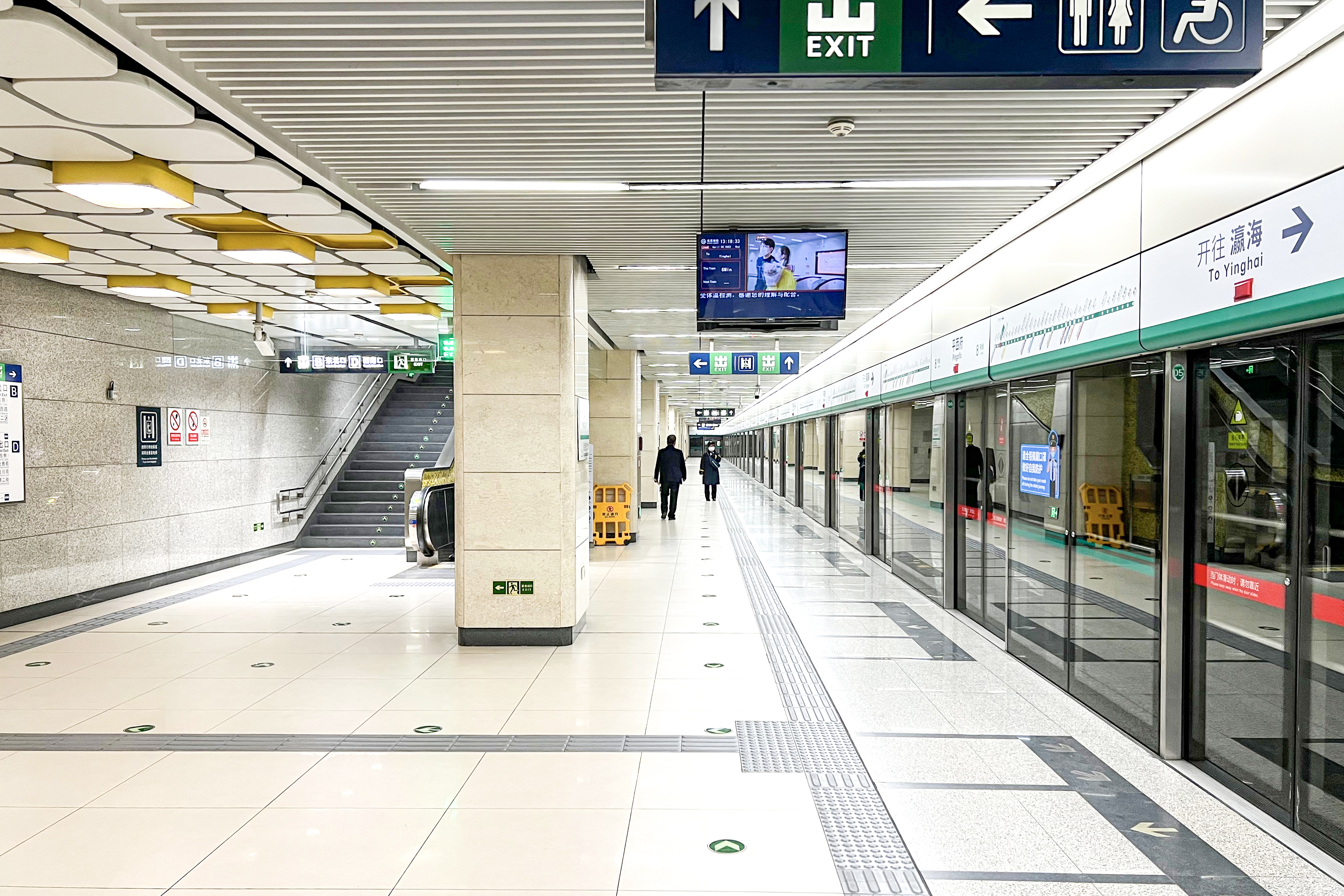
Pingxifu station southbound platform

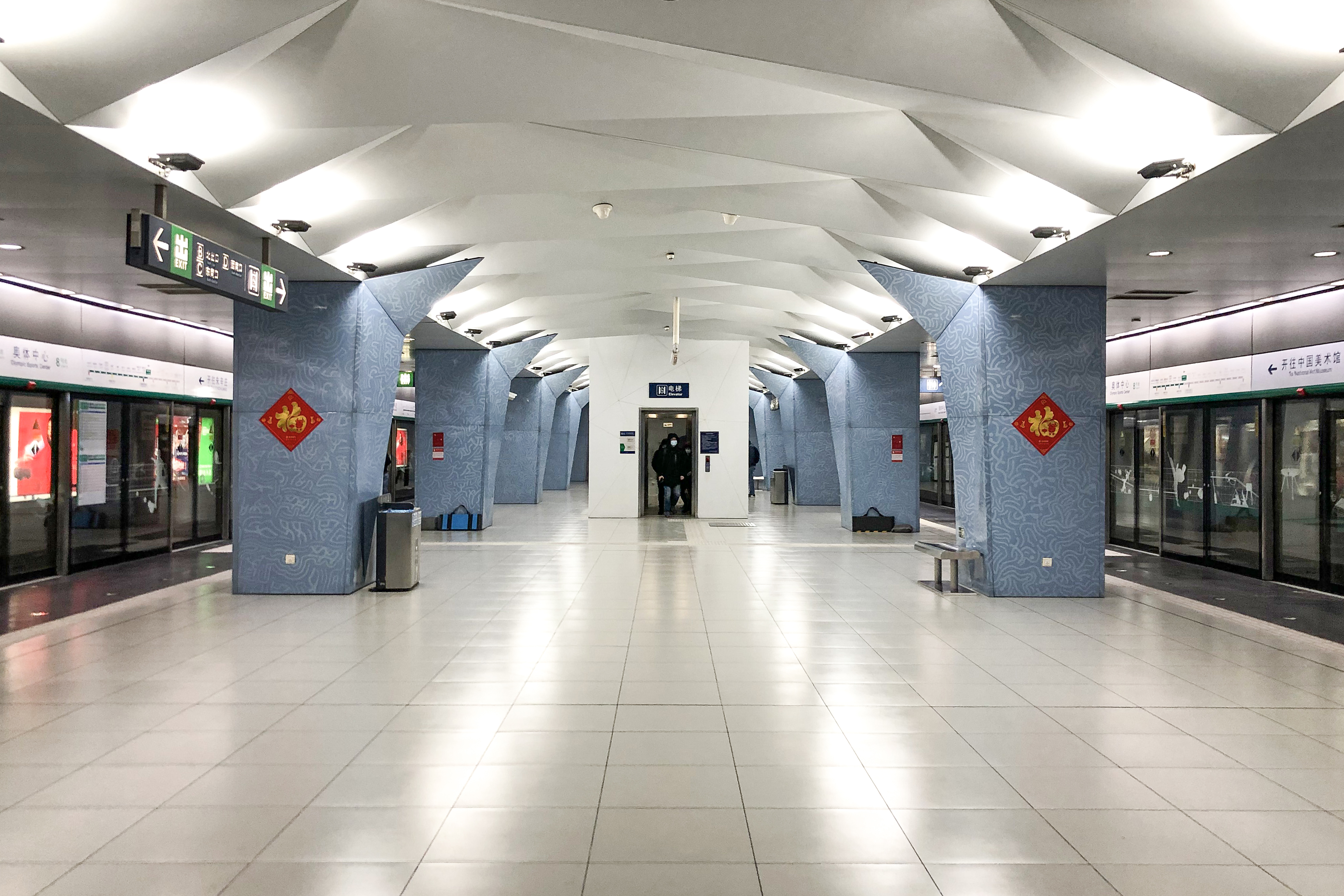
Olympic Sports Center station platform

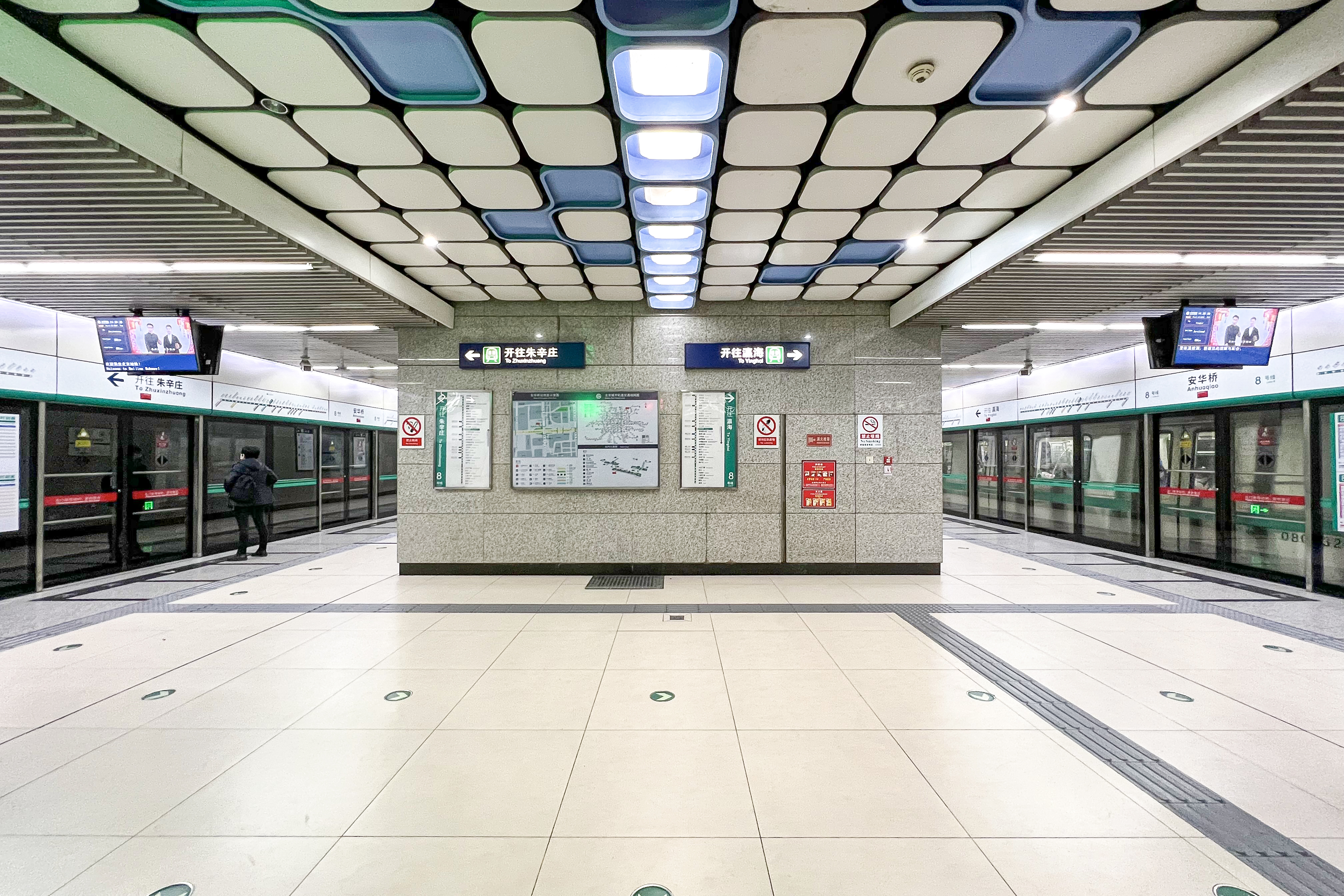
Anhuaqiao station platform

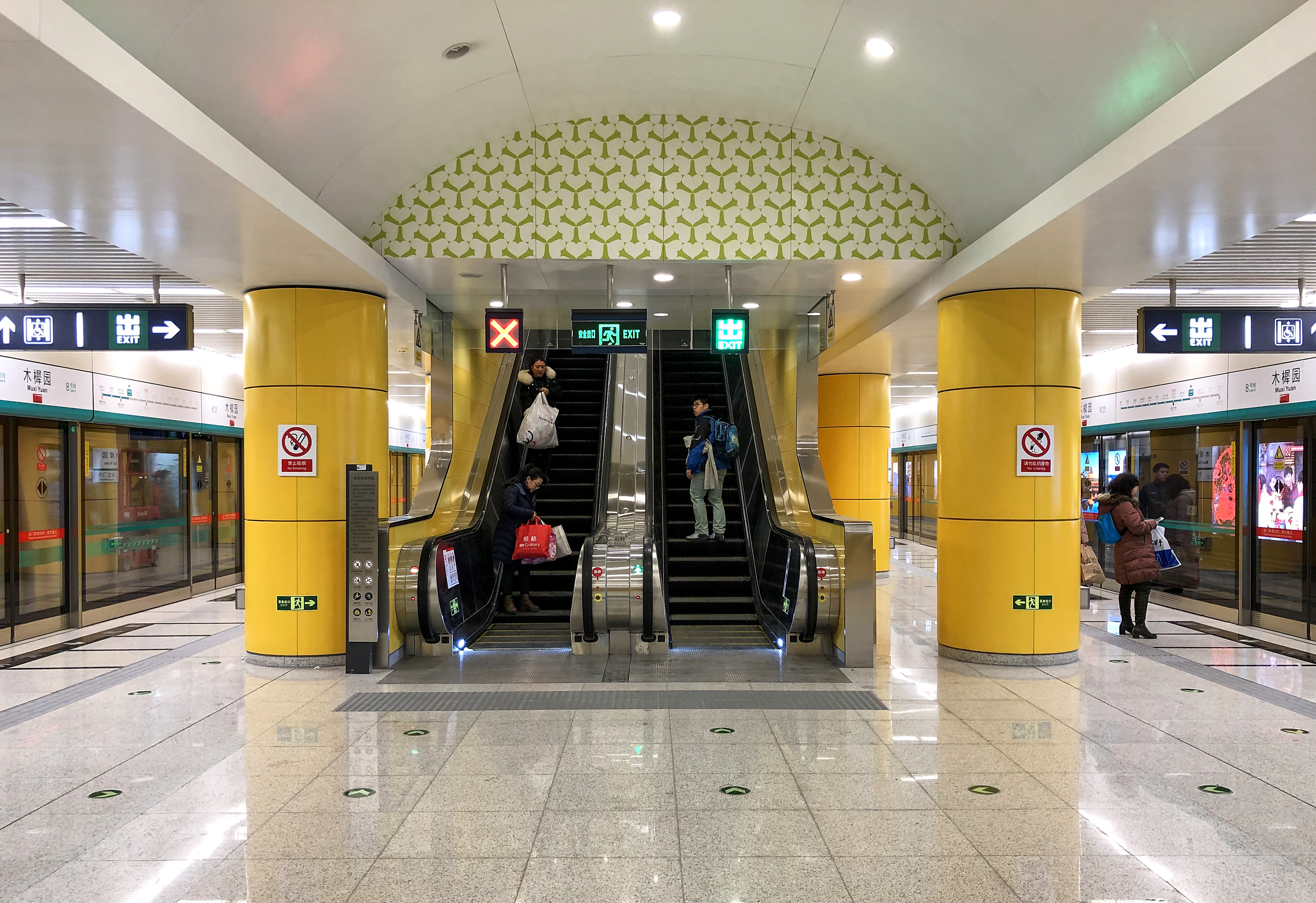
Muxiyuan station platform

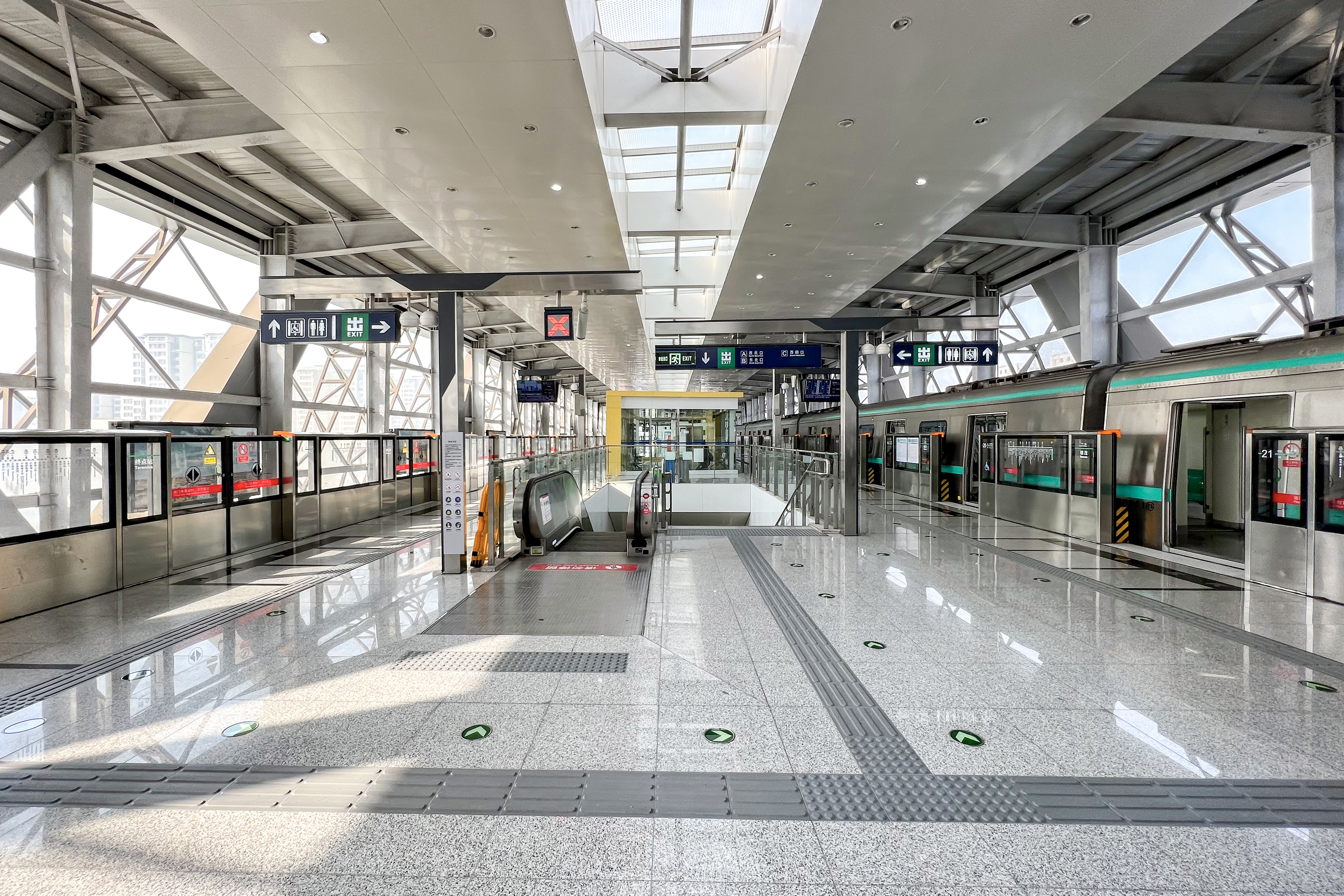
Yinghai station platform

Stations of Line 8
Station	Chinese name	Location	Transfers	Platform type	Grade	Opened
Zhuxinzhuang	朱辛庄	Changping	Changping	Cross-platform	Elevated	28 December 2013
Yuzhi Lu	育知路	Changping		Side	Underground	28 December 2013
Pingxifu	平西府	Changping		Side	Underground	28 December 2013
Huilongguan Dongdajie	回龙观东大街	Changping		Island	Underground	31 December 2011
Huoying	霍营	Changping	13 S2; Huangtudian	Island	Underground	31 December 2011
Yuxin	育新	Changping/Haidian		Island	Underground	31 December 2011
Xixiaokou	西小口	Haidian		Island	Underground	31 December 2011
Yongtaizhuang	永泰庄	Haidian		Island	Underground	31 December 2011
Lincuiqiao	林萃桥	Chaoyang		Island	Underground	31 December 2011
Forest Park South Gate	森林公园南门	Chaoyang		Island	Underground	19 July 2008
Olympic Park	奥林匹克公园	Chaoyang	15	Island	Underground	19 July 2008
Olympic Sports Center	奥体中心	Chaoyang		Island	Underground	10 October 2008
Beitucheng	北土城	Chaoyang	10	Island	Underground	19 July 2008
Anhua Qiao	安华桥	Xicheng/Chaoyang	12	Island	Underground	30 December 2012
Andeli Beijie	安德里北街	Dongcheng		Island	Underground	26 December 2015
Gulou Dajie	鼓楼大街	Dongcheng/Xicheng	2	Island	Underground	30 December 2012
Shichahai	什刹海	Dongcheng/Xicheng		Island	Underground	28 December 2013
Nanluogu Xiang	南锣鼓巷	Dongcheng	6	Split (Cross-platform)	Underground	28 December 2013
National Art Museum	中国美术馆	Dongcheng		Split	Underground	30 December 2018
Jinyu Hutong	金鱼胡同	Dongcheng		Island	Underground	31 December 2021
Wangfujing	王府井	Dongcheng	1	Island	Underground	31 December 2021
Qianmen	前门	Dongcheng	2	Island	Underground	31 December 2021
Zhushikou	珠市口	Dongcheng/Xicheng	7	Island	Underground	30 December 2018
Tianqiao	天桥	Dongcheng/Xicheng		Island	Underground	30 December 2018
Yongdingmenwai	永定门外	Dongcheng	14	Island	Underground	30 December 2018
Muxiyuan	木樨园	Dongcheng		Island	Underground	30 December 2018
Haihutun	海户屯	Fengtai		Island	Underground	30 December 2018
Dahongmen	大红门	Fengtai	10	Island	Underground	Not open
Dahongmennan	大红门南	Fengtai		Island	Underground	30 December 2018
Heyi	和义	Fengtai		Island	Underground	30 December 2018
Donggaodi	东高地	Fengtai		Island	Underground	30 December 2018
Huojian Wanyuan	火箭万源	Fengtai		Island	Underground	30 December 2018
Wufutang	五福堂	Daxing		Island	Underground	30 December 2018
Demao	德茂	Daxing		Island	Elevated	30 December 2018
Yinghai	瀛海	Daxing		Island	Elevated	30 December 2018

== Line 9 ==
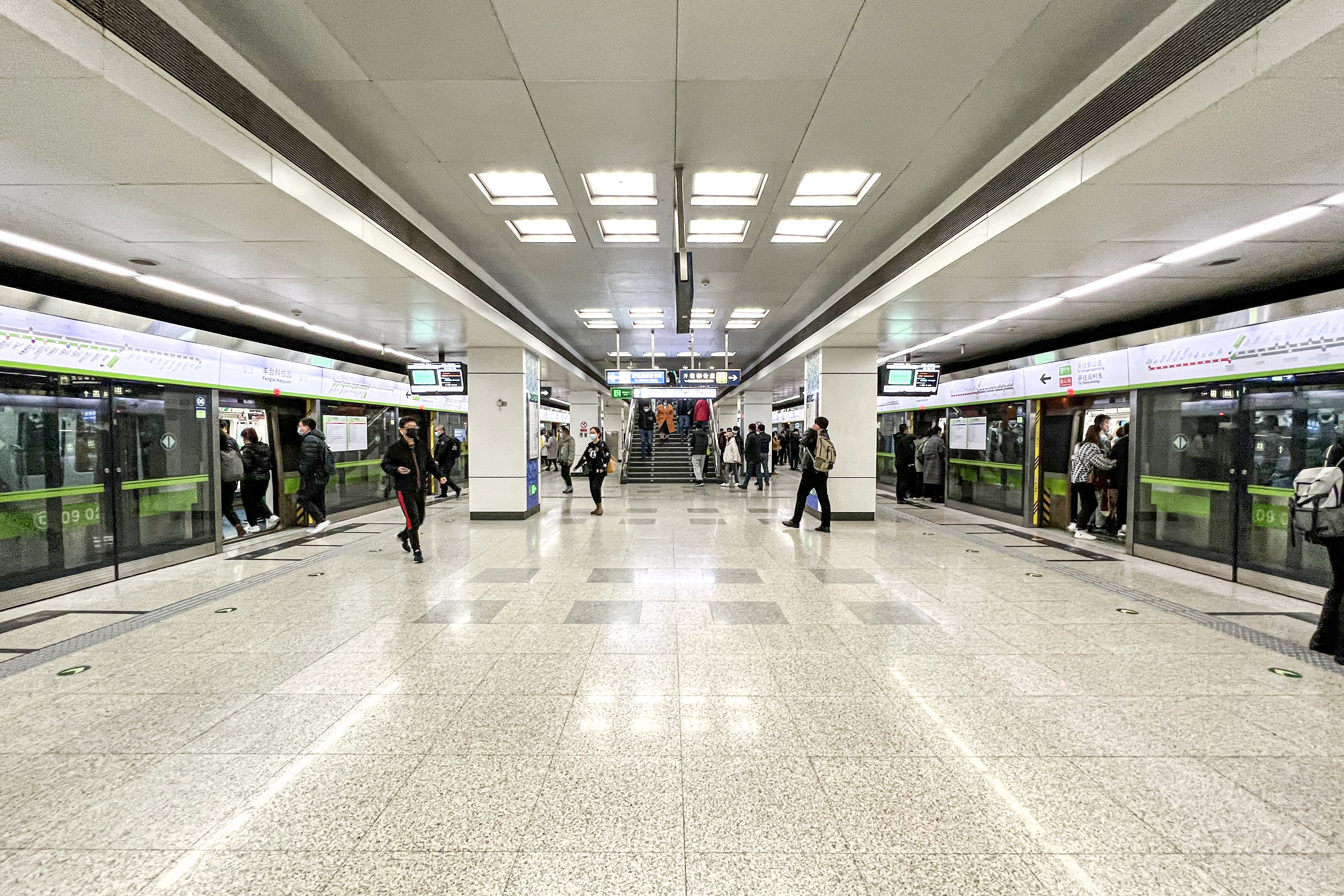
Fengtai Science Park station platform

Stations of Line 9
Station	Chinese name	Location	Transfers	Platform type	Grade	Opened
National Library	国家图书馆	Haidian	4 16	Dual-Island	Underground	30 December 2012
Baishiqiaonan	白石桥南	Haidian	6	Island	Underground	30 December 2012
Baiduizi	白堆子	Haidian		Island	Underground	30 December 2012
Military Museum	军事博物馆	Haidian	1	Island	Underground	21 December 2013
Beijing West railway station	北京西站	Xicheng	7 Sub-Central; Beijing West	Dual-Island	Underground	31 December 2011
Liuliqiaodong	六里桥东	Fengtai		Island	Underground	31 December 2011
Liuliqiao	六里桥	Fengtai	10	Side	Underground	31 December 2011
Qilizhuang	七里庄	Fengtai	14	Island	Underground	31 December 2011
Fengtai Dongdajie	丰台东大街	Fengtai		Island	Underground	12 October 2012
Fengtai Nanlu	丰台南路	Fengtai	16	Island	Underground	31 December 2011
Keyi Lu	科怡路	Fengtai		Island	Underground	31 December 2011
Fengtai Science Park	丰台科技园	Fengtai		Island	Underground	31 December 2011
Guogongzhuang	郭公庄	Fengtai	Fangshan	Dual-Island	Underground	31 December 2011

== Line 10 ==
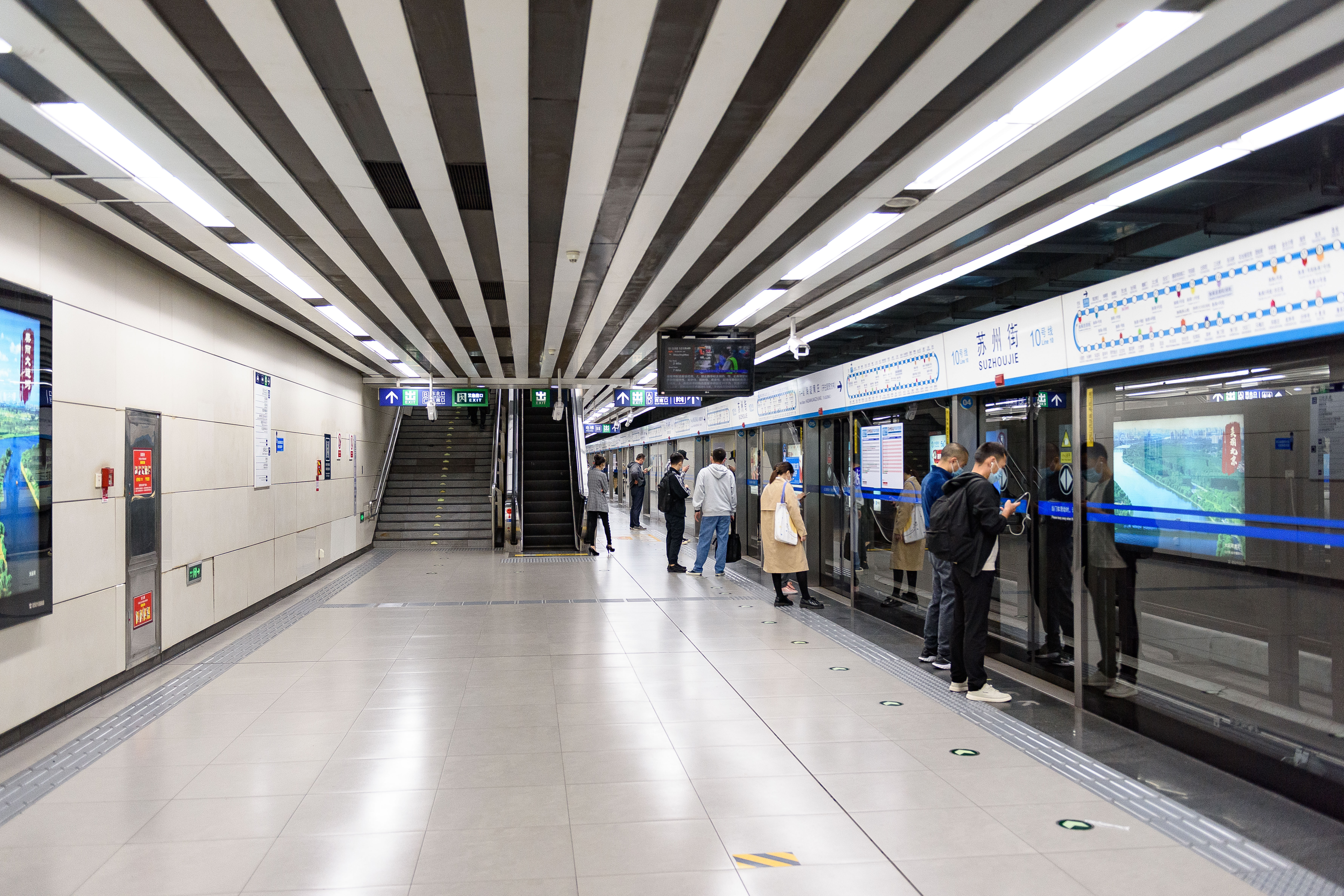
Suzhou Jie station clockwise platform

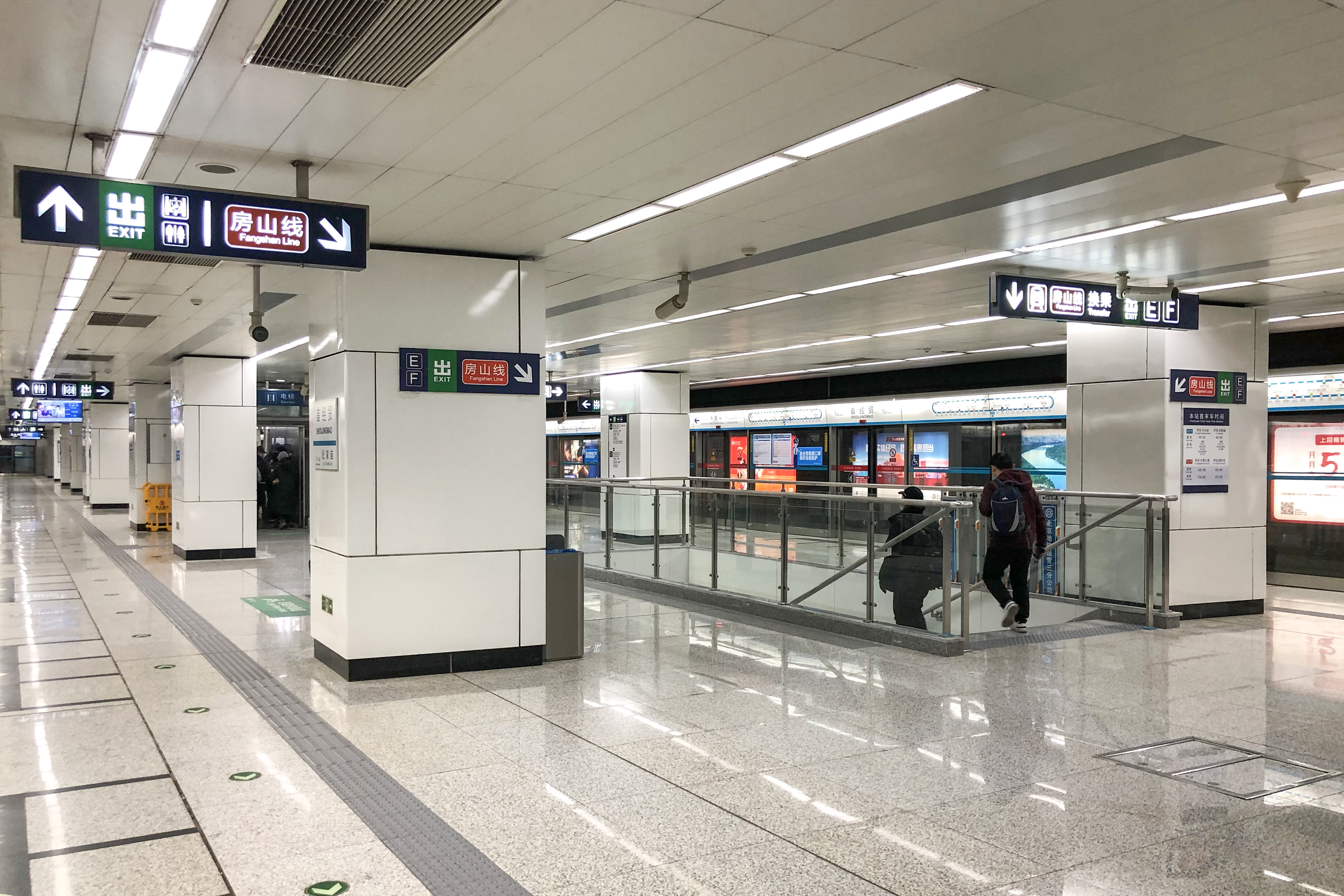
Capital Univ. of Economics & Business station platform

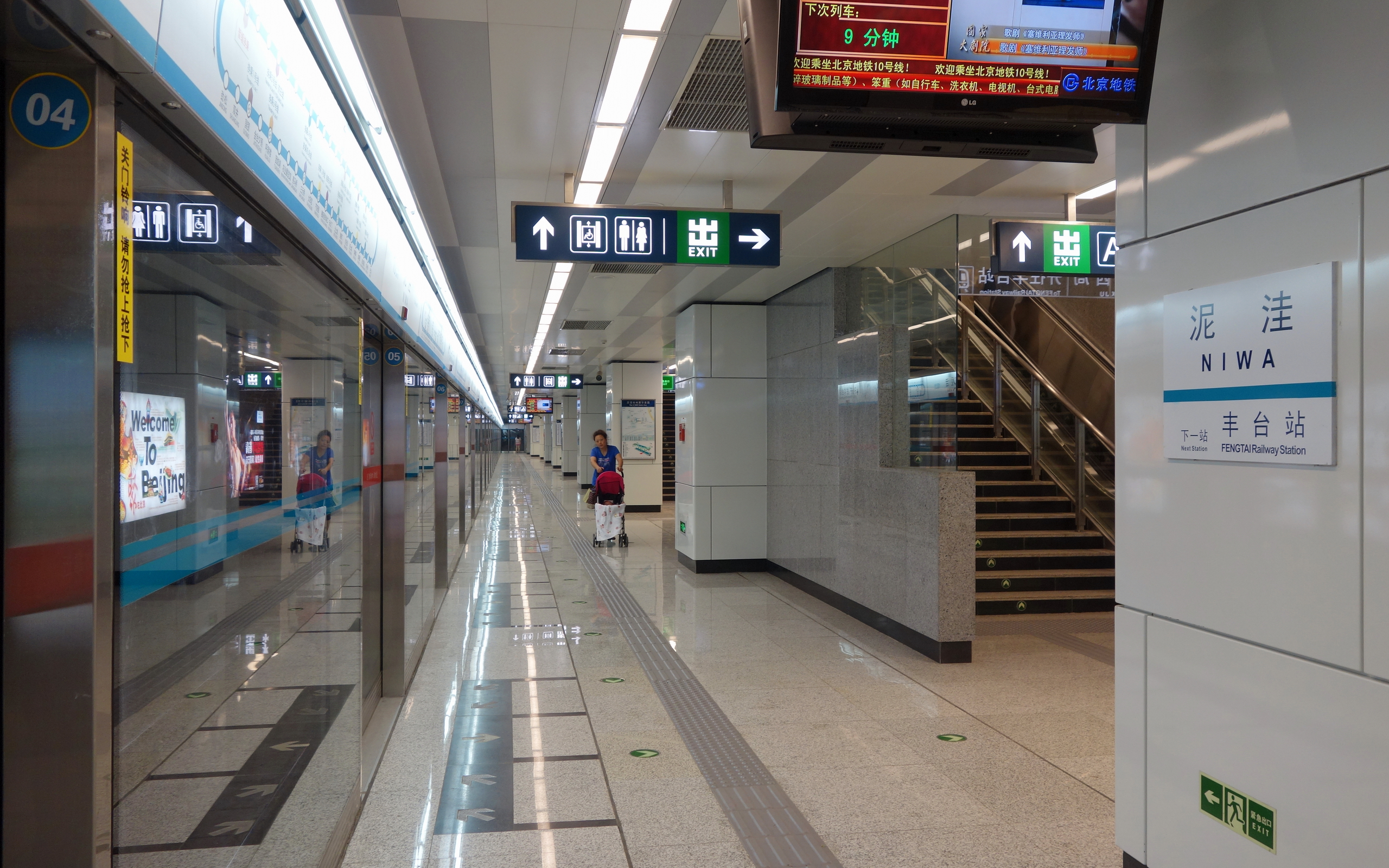
Niwa station platform

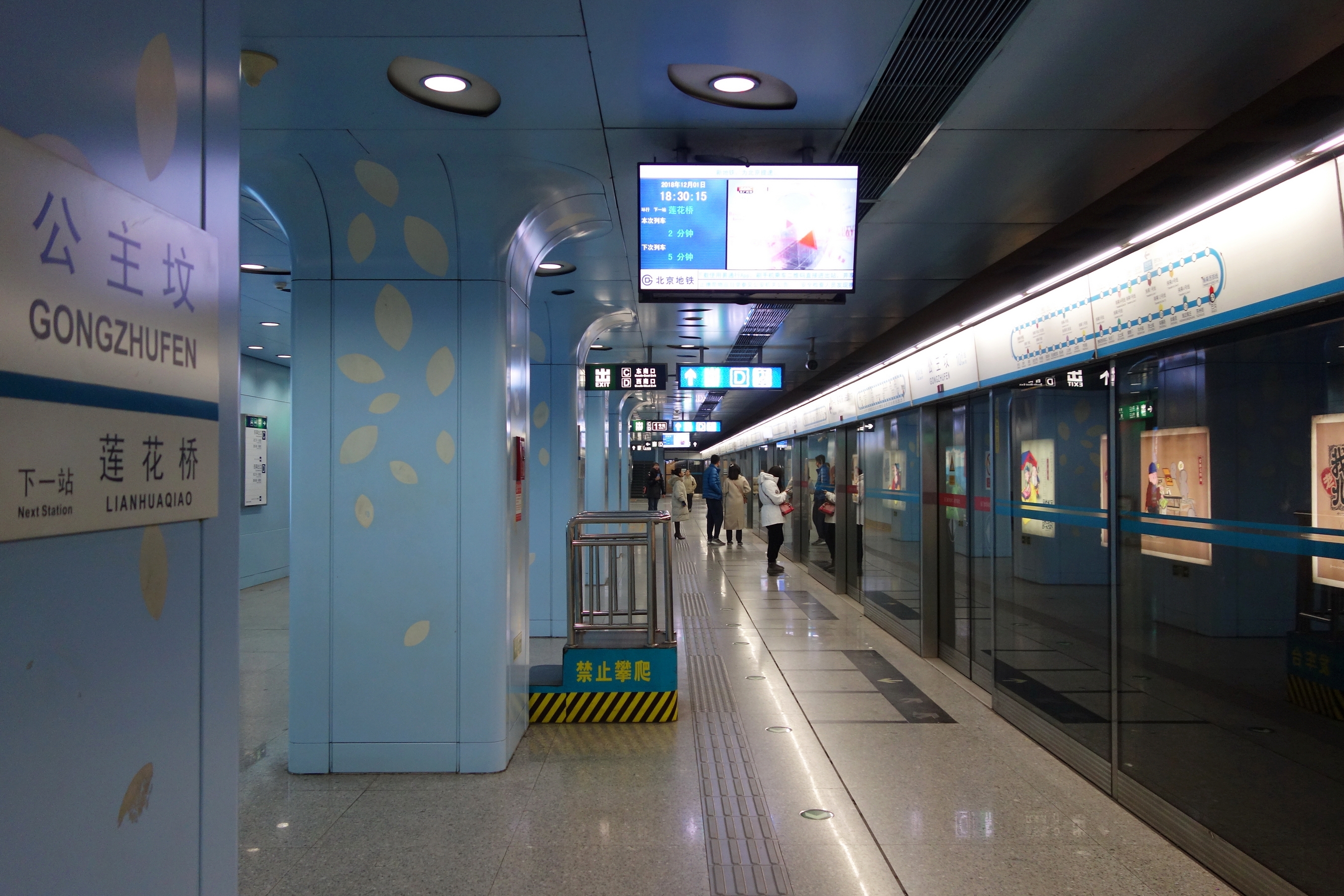
Gongzhufen station platform

Stations of Line 10
Station	Chinese name	Location	Transfers	Platform type	Grade	Opened
— ↑ loop line – towards Huoqiying ↑ —
Bagou	巴沟	Haidian	Xijiao	Dual-island	Underground	19 July 2008
Suzhou Jie	苏州街	Haidian		Side	Underground	19 July 2008
Haidian Huangzhuang	海淀黄庄	Haidian	4	Side	Underground	19 July 2008
Zhichun Li	知春里	Haidian		Island	Underground	19 July 2008
Zhichun Lu	知春路	Haidian	13	Split	Underground	19 July 2008
Xitucheng	西土城	Haidian	Changping	Island	Underground	19 July 2008
Mudanyuan	牡丹园	Haidian	19	Island	Underground	19 July 2008
Jiande Men	健德门	Haidian/Chaoyang		Island	Underground	19 July 2008
Beitucheng	北土城	Chaoyang	8	Island	Underground	19 July 2008
Anzhenmen	安贞门	Chaoyang		Side/island hybrid	Underground	19 July 2008
Huixin Xijie Nankou	惠新西街南口	Chaoyang	5	Side	Underground	19 July 2008
Shaoyaoju	芍药居	Chaoyang	13	Island	Underground	19 July 2008
Taiyanggong	太阳宫	Chaoyang		Island	Underground	19 July 2008
Sanyuan Qiao	三元桥	Chaoyang	12 Capital Airport	Island	Underground	19 July 2008
Liangma Qiao	亮马桥	Chaoyang		Island	Underground	19 July 2008
Agricultural Exhibition Center	农业展览馆	Chaoyang		Island	Underground	19 July 2008
Tuanjiehu	团结湖	Chaoyang	3	Split	Underground	19 July 2008
Hujialou	呼家楼	Chaoyang	6	Split	Underground	19 July 2008
Jintai Xizhao	金台夕照	Chaoyang		Split	Underground	19 July 2008
Guomao	国贸	Chaoyang	1	Split	Underground	19 July 2008
Shuangjing	双井	Chaoyang	7	Island	Underground	19 July 2008
Jingsong	劲松	Chaoyang		Island	Underground	19 July 2008
Panjia Yuan	潘家园	Chaoyang		Island	Underground	30 December 2012
Shilihe	十里河	Chaoyang	14 17	Island	Underground	30 December 2012
Fenzhong Si	分钟寺	Fengtai		Island	Underground	30 December 2012
Chengshou Si	成寿寺	Fengtai		Island	Underground	30 December 2012
Songjiazhuang	宋家庄	Fengtai	5 Yizhuang	Dual-Island	Underground	30 December 2012
Shiliuzhuang	石榴庄	Fengtai		Island	Underground	30 December 2012
Dahong Men	大红门	Fengtai		Island	Underground	30 December 2012
Jiaomendong	角门东	Fengtai		Island	Underground	5 May 2013
Jiaomenxi	角门西	Fengtai	4	Island	Underground	30 December 2012
Caoqiao	草桥	Fengtai	19 Daxing Airport	Island	Underground	30 December 2012
Jijiamiao	纪家庙	Fengtai		Island	Underground	30 December 2012
Capital Univ. of Economics & Business	首经贸	Fengtai	Fangshan	Island	Underground	30 December 2012
Fengtai railway station	丰台站	Fengtai	16; Beijing Fengtai	Island	Underground	5 May 2013
Niwa	泥洼	Fengtai		Island	Underground	5 May 2013
Xiju	西局	Fengtai	14	Island	Underground	30 December 2012
Liuli Qiao	六里桥	Fengtai	9	Island	Underground	30 December 2012
Lianhua Qiao	莲花桥	Haidian		Island	Underground	30 December 2012
Gongzhufen	公主坟	Haidian	1	Split	Underground	30 December 2012
Xidiaoyutai	西钓鱼台	Haidian		Island	Underground	30 December 2012
Cishou Si	慈寿寺	Haidian	6	Island	Underground	30 December 2012
Chedaogou	车道沟	Haidian		Island	Underground	30 December 2012
Changchun Qiao	长春桥	Haidian	12	Island	Underground	30 December 2012
Huoqiying	火器营	Haidian		Island	Underground	30 December 2012
— ↓ loop line – towards Bagou ↓ —		Haidian				

== Line 11 ==
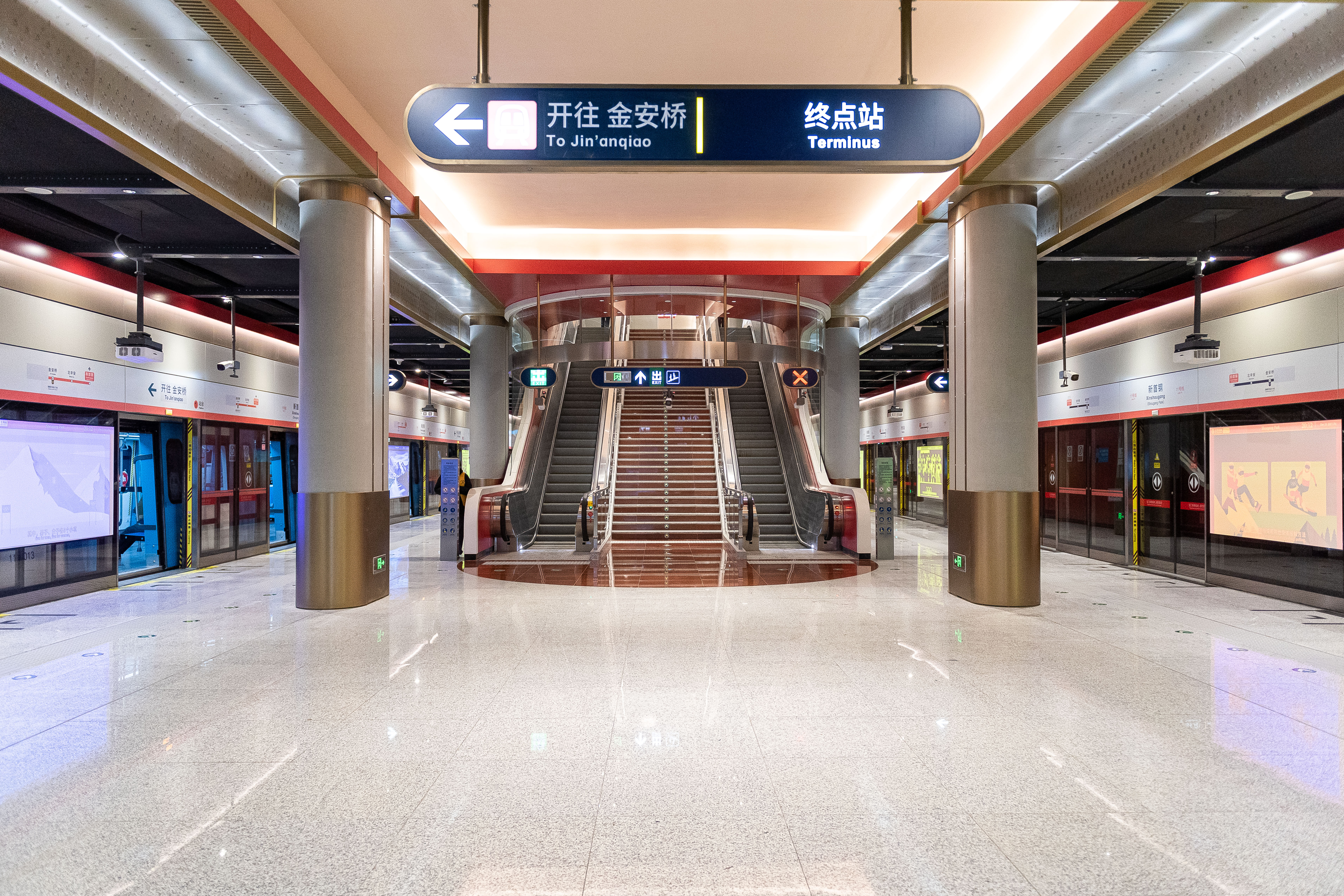
Xinshougang (Shougang Park) station platform

Stations of Line 11
Station	Chinese name	Location	Transfers	Platform type	Grade	Opened
Moshikou	模式口	Shijingshan		Side	Underground	30 December 2023
Jin'anqiao	金安桥	Shijingshan	6 S1	Island	Underground	31 December 2021
Beixin'an	北辛安	Shijingshan		Island	Underground	31 December 2021
Xinshougang (Shougang Park)	新首钢	Shijingshan		Island	Underground	31 December 2021

== Line 12 ==
Stations of Line 12
Station	Chinese name	Location	Transfers	Platform type	Grade	Opened
Sijiqing Qiao	四季青桥	Haidian		Island	Underground	15 December 2024
Landianchang	蓝靛厂	Haidian		Island	Underground	15 December 2024
Changchun Qiao	长春桥	Haidian	10	Island	Underground	15 December 2024
Suzhou Qiao	苏州桥	Haidian	16	Island	Underground	15 December 2024
Renmin Daxue (Renmin Univ.)	人民大学	Haidian	4	Split Island	Underground	15 December 2024
Dazhong Si	大钟寺	Haidian	13	Split Island	Underground	15 December 2024
Jimen Qiao	蓟门桥	Haidian	Changping	Island	Underground	15 December 2024
Beitaipingzhuang	北太平庄	Haidian/Xicheng	19	Island	Underground	15 December 2024
Madian Qiao	马甸桥	Xicheng		Island	Underground	15 December 2024
Anhua Qiao	安华桥	Xicheng/Chaoyang	8	Island	Underground	15 December 2024
Anzhen Qiao	安贞桥	Chaoyang/Dongcheng		Split Island	Underground	15 December 2024
Heping Xiqiao	和平西桥	Chaoyang	5	Split Island	Underground	15 December 2024
Guangxi Men	光熙门	Chaoyang	13	Island	Underground	15 December 2024
Xibahe	西坝河	Chaoyang	17	Island	Underground	15 December 2024
Sanyuanqiao	三元桥	Chaoyang	10 Capital Airport	Island	Underground	15 December 2024
Jiangtaixi	将台西	Chaoyang		Island	Underground	15 December 2024
Gaojiayuan	高家园	Chaoyang		Island	Underground	15 December 2024
Tuofangying	驼房营	Chaoyang		Island	Underground	15 December 2024
Dongbaxi	东坝西	Chaoyang		Island	Underground	15 December 2024
Dongbabei	东坝北	Chaoyang	3	Island	Underground	15 December 2024

== Line 13 ==
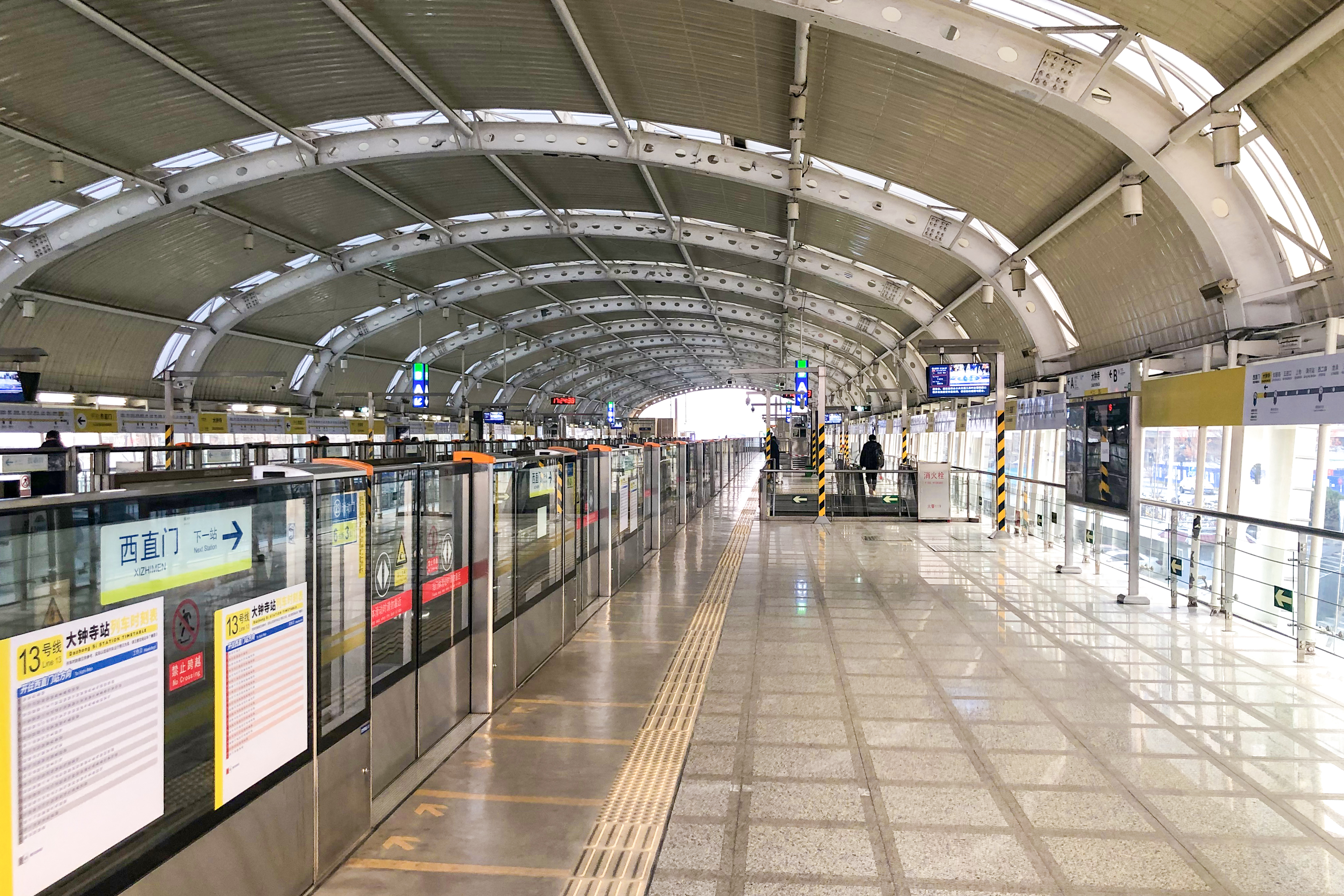
Dazhongsi station southbound platform

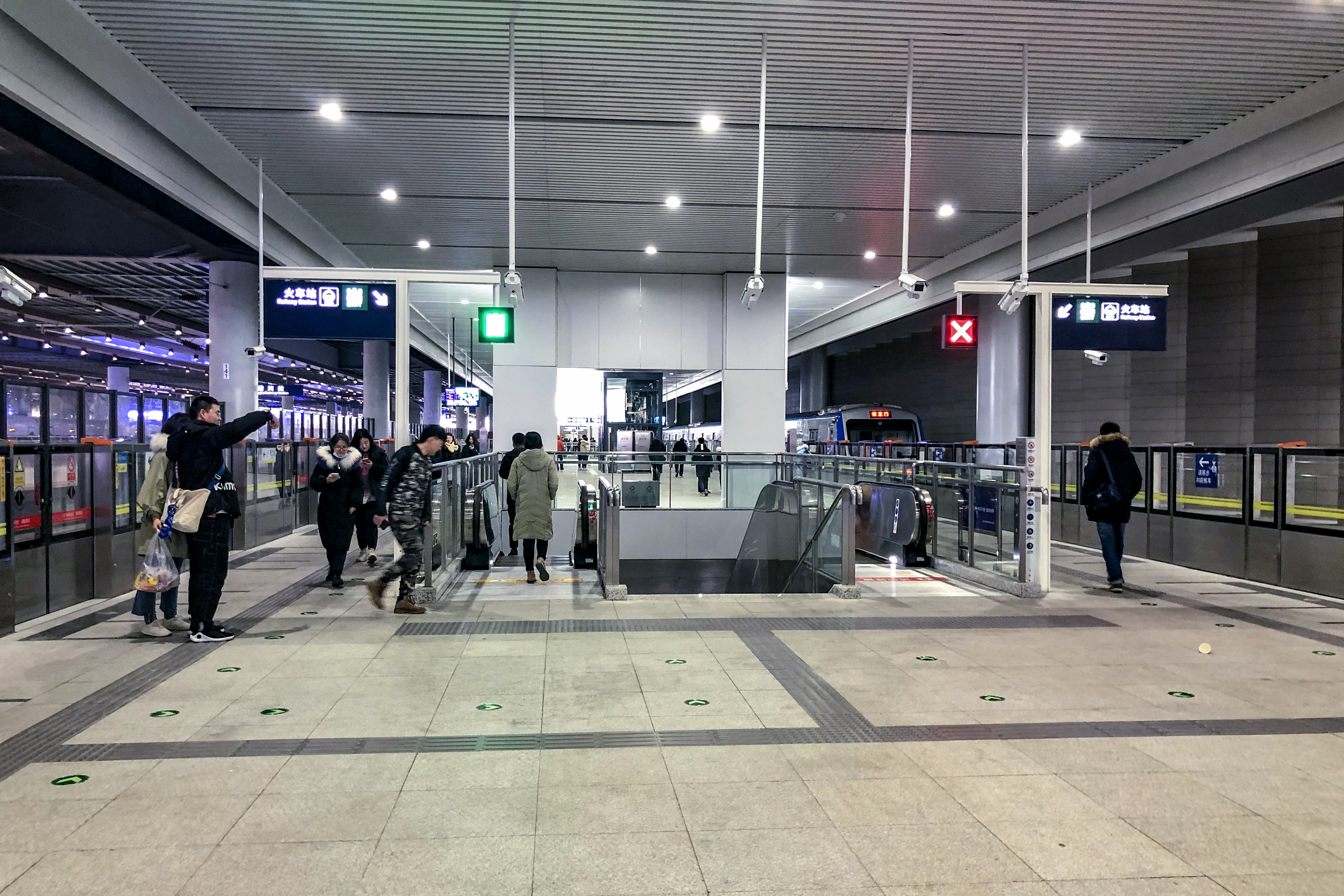
Qinghe railway station platform

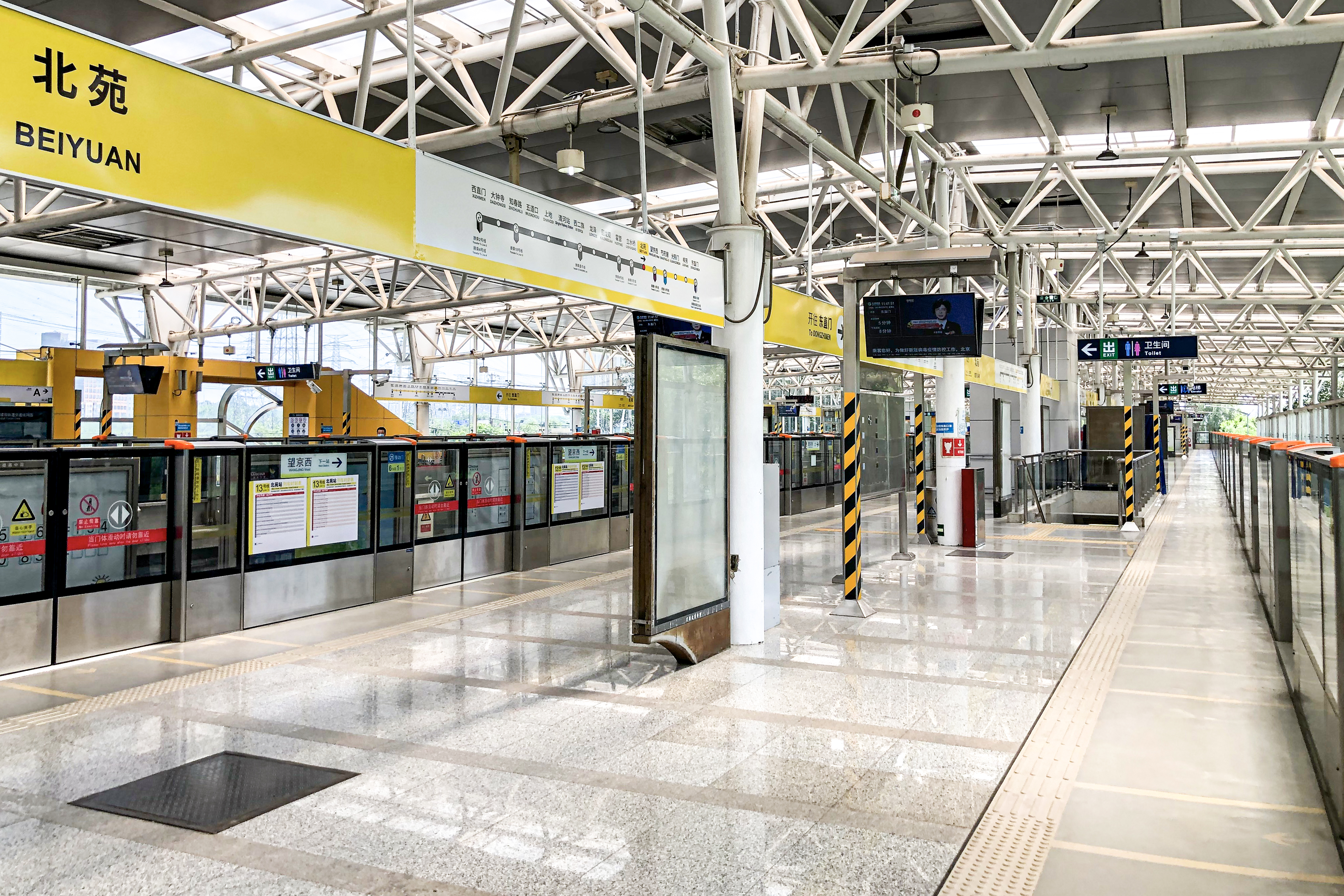
Beiyuan station eastbound platform

Stations of Line 13
Code	Station	Chinese name	Location	Transfers	Platform type	Grade	Opened
1301	Xizhimen	西直门	Xicheng	2 4 Huairou–Miyun; Beijing North	Spanish solution	Elevated	28 September 2002
1302	Dazhong Si	大钟寺	Haidian	12	Side	Elevated	28 September 2002
1303	Zhichun Lu	知春路	Haidian	10	Side	At-grade	28 September 2002
1304	Wudaokou	五道口	Haidian		Side	Elevated	28 September 2002
1305	Shangdi	上地	Haidian		Side	At-grade	28 September 2002
—	Qinghe railway station	清河站	Haidian	Changping Huairou–Miyun; Qinghe	Island	At-grade	30 December 2019
1306	Xi'erqi	西二旗	Haidian	Changping	Side	At-grade	25 December 2010 (new station); 28 September 2002 (old station)
1307	Longze	龙泽	Changping		Side	Elevated	28 September 2002
1308	Huilongguan	回龙观	Changping		Side	At-grade	28 September 2002
1309	Huoying	霍营	Changping	8 S2; Huangtudian	Side	At-grade	28 September 2002
1310	Lishuiqiao	立水桥	Chaoyang	5	Side	Elevated	9 January 2003
1311	Beiyuan	北苑	Chaoyang		Side	At-grade	9 January 2003
1312	Wangjingxi	望京西	Chaoyang	15	Side	At-grade	9 January 2003
1313	Shaoyaoju	芍药居	Chaoyang	10	Side	At-grade	9 January 2003
1314	Guangximen	光熙门	Chaoyang	12	Side	At-grade	9 January 2003
1315	Liufang	柳芳	Chaoyang		Side	At-grade	9 January 2003
1316	Dongzhimen	东直门	Dongcheng	2 Capital Airport	Side	Underground	9 January 2003

== Line 14 ==
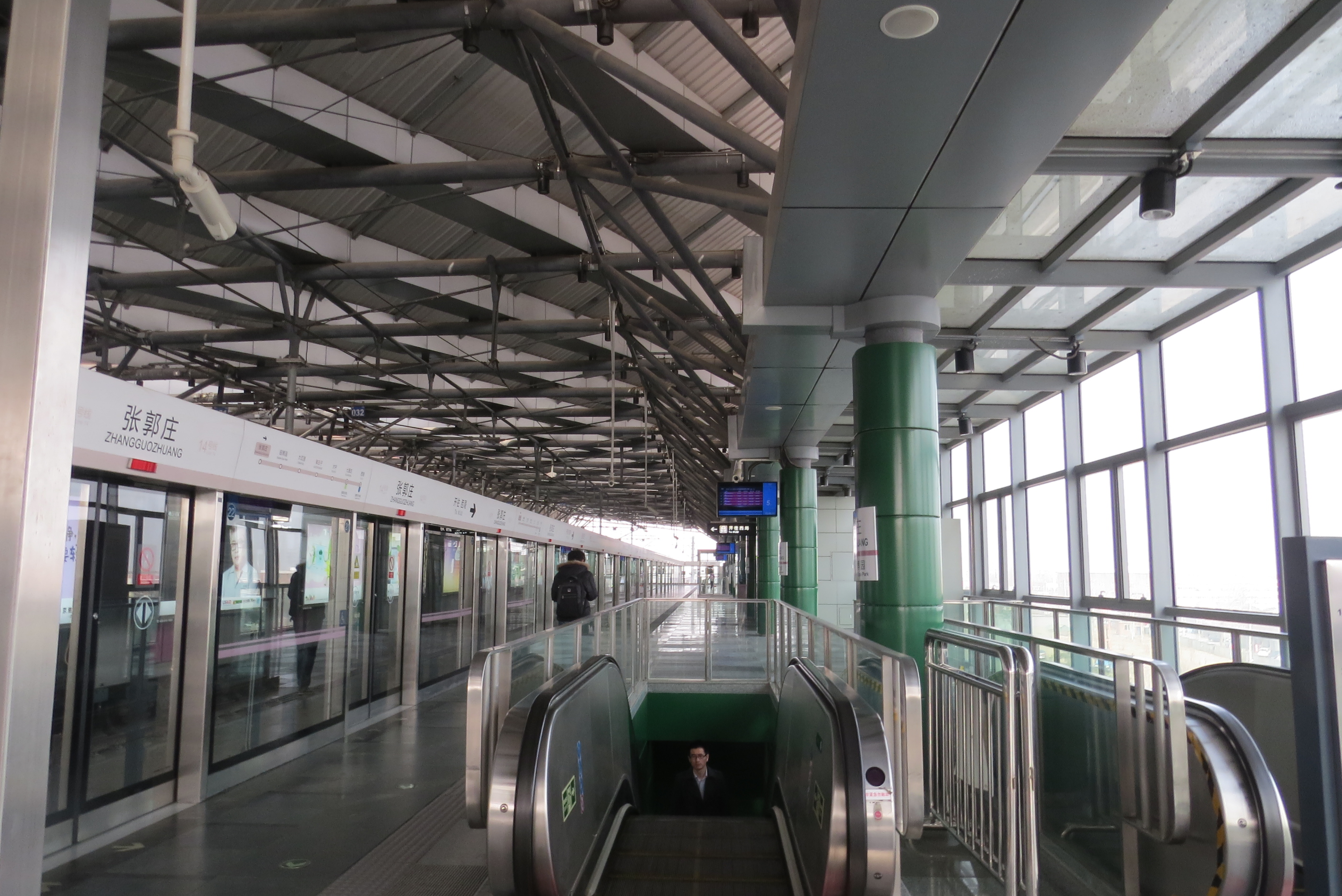
Zhangguozhuang station platform

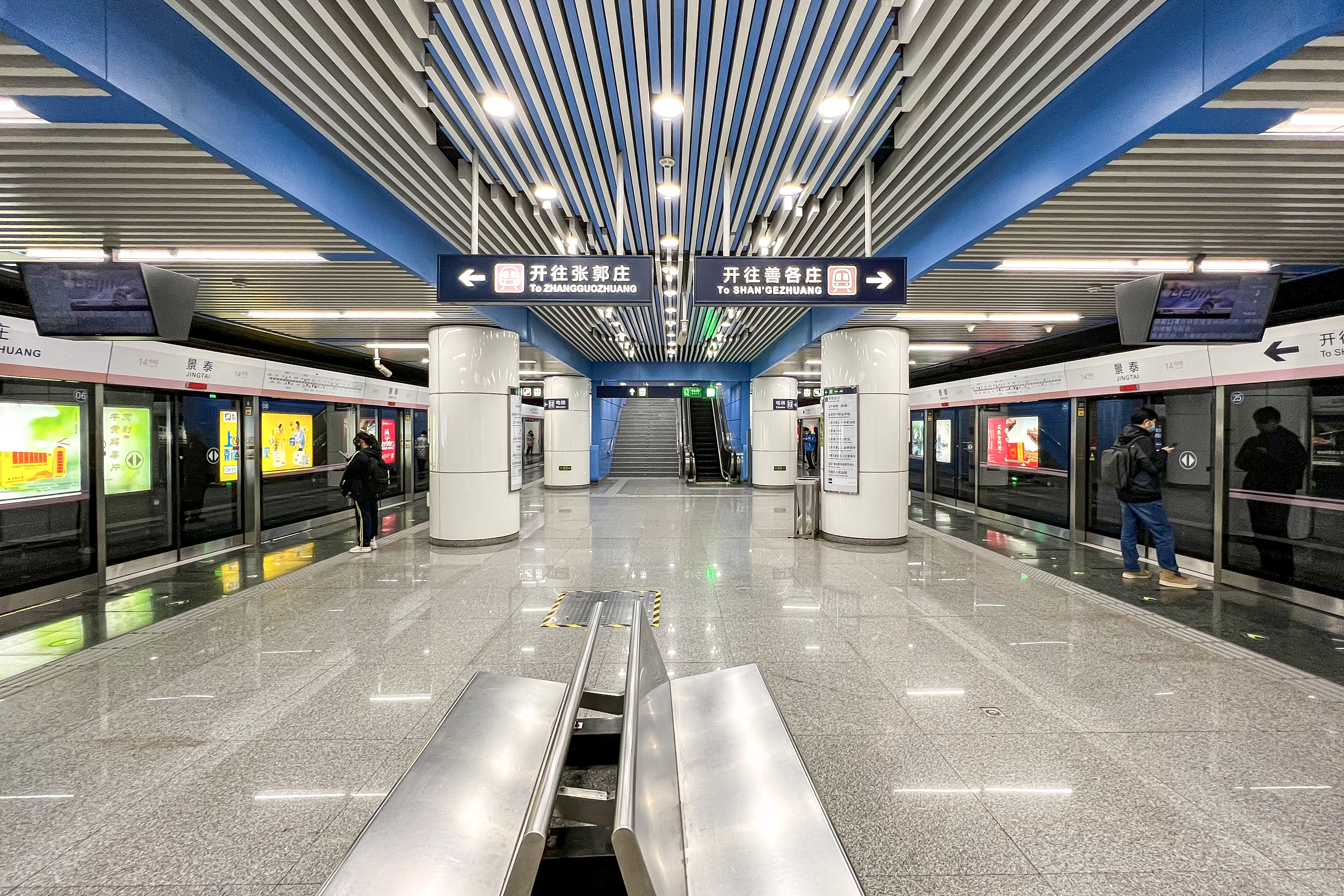
Jingtai station platform

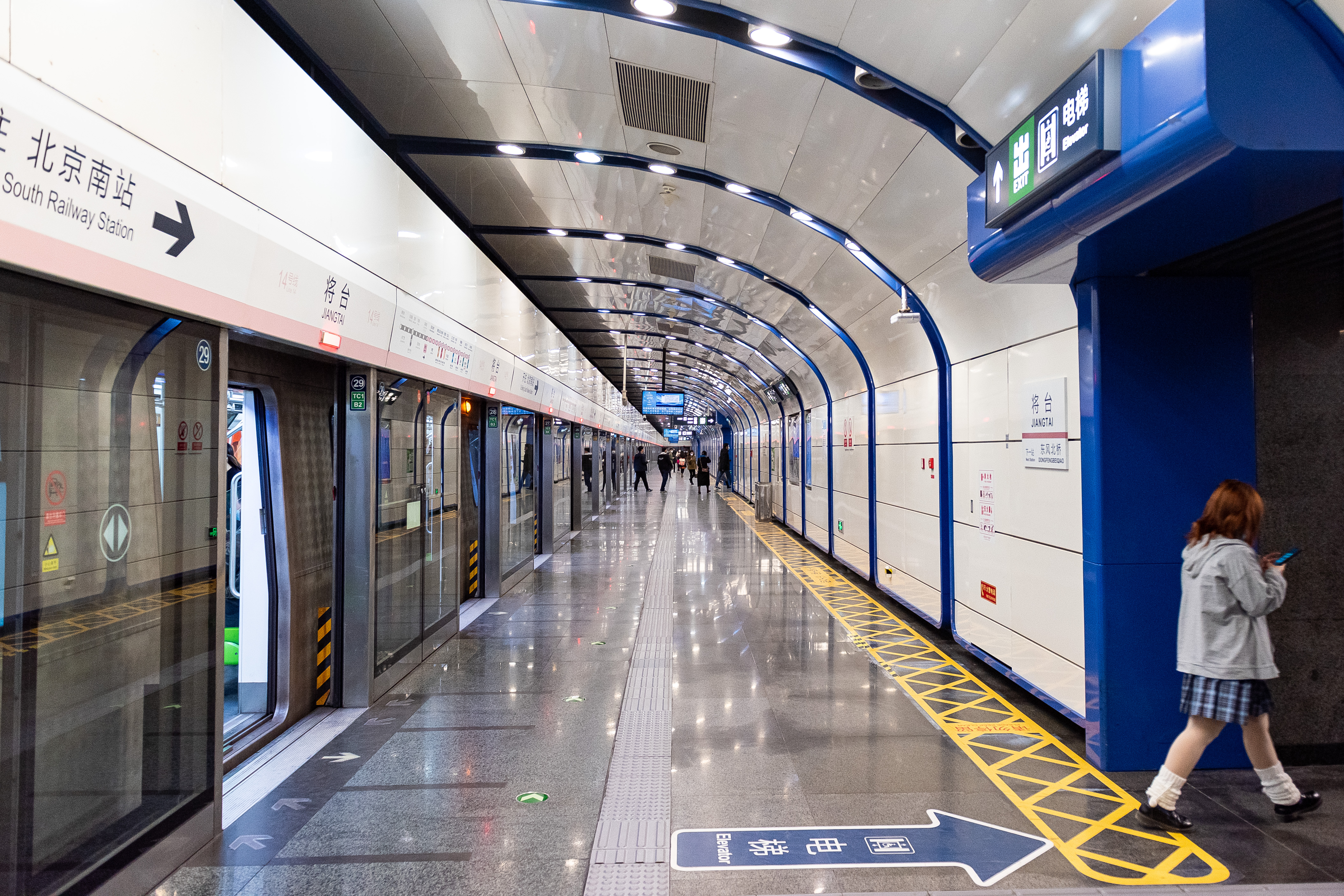
Jiangtai station southbound platform

Stations of Line 14
Station	Chinese name	Location	Transfers	Platform type	Grade	Opened
Zhangguozhuang	张郭庄	Fengtai		Side	Elevated	5 May 2013
Garden Expo Park	园博园	Fengtai		Side	Elevated	5 May 2013
Dawayao	大瓦窑	Fengtai		Island	Underground	5 May 2013
Guozhuangzi	郭庄子	Fengtai		Island	Underground	5 May 2013
Dajing	大井	Fengtai		Island	Underground	5 May 2013
Qilizhuang	七里庄	Fengtai	9	Split	Underground	15 February 2014
Xiju	西局	Fengtai	10	Island	Underground	5 May 2013
Dongguantou	东管头	Fengtai		Island	Underground	31 December 2021
Lize Shangwuqu	丽泽商务区	Fengtai	16	Island	Underground	31 December 2021
Caihuying	菜户营	Fengtai		Island	Underground	31 December 2021
Xitieying	西铁营	Fengtai		Island	Underground	31 December 2021
Jingfengmen	景风门	Fengtai	19	Island	Underground	31 December 2021
Beijing South railway station	北京南站	Fengtai	4 Beijing South	Island	Underground	26 December 2015
Taoranqiao	陶然桥	Dongcheng		Island	Underground	Not open
Yongdingmenwai	永定门外	Dongcheng	8	Island	Underground	26 December 2015
Jingtai	景泰	Dongcheng		Island	Underground	26 December 2015
Puhuangyu	蒲黄榆	Fengtai	5	Island	Underground	26 December 2015
Fangzhuang	方庄	Fengtai		Island	Underground	26 December 2015
Shilihe	十里河	Chaoyang	10 17	Island	Underground	26 December 2015
Beijing Univ. of Tech. West Gate	北工大西门	Chaoyang		Island	Underground	26 December 2015
Pingleyuan	平乐园	Chaoyang		Island	Underground	30 December 2017
Jiulongshan	九龙山	Chaoyang	7	Island	Underground	26 December 2015
Dawang Lu	大望路	Chaoyang	1	Island	Underground	26 December 2015
Hongmiao	红庙	Chaoyang		Side	Underground	Not open
Jintai Lu	金台路	Chaoyang	6	Island	Underground	28 December 2014
Chaoyang Park	朝阳公园	Chaoyang	3	Island	Underground	31 December 2016
Zaoying	枣营	Chaoyang		Island	Underground	28 December 2014
Dongfeng Beiqiao	东风北桥	Chaoyang		Island	Underground	28 December 2014
Jiangtai	将台	Chaoyang		Side	Underground	28 December 2014
Gaojiayuan	高家园	Chaoyang	12	Side	Underground	Not open
Wangjingnan	望京南	Chaoyang		Side	Underground	28 December 2014
Futong	阜通	Chaoyang		Island	Underground	28 December 2014
Wangjing	望京	Chaoyang	15	Island	Underground	28 December 2014
Donghuqu	东湖渠	Chaoyang		Island	Underground	28 December 2014
Laiguangying	来广营	Chaoyang		Island	Underground	28 December 2014
Shangezhuang	善各庄	Chaoyang		Island	Underground	28 December 2014

== Line 15 ==
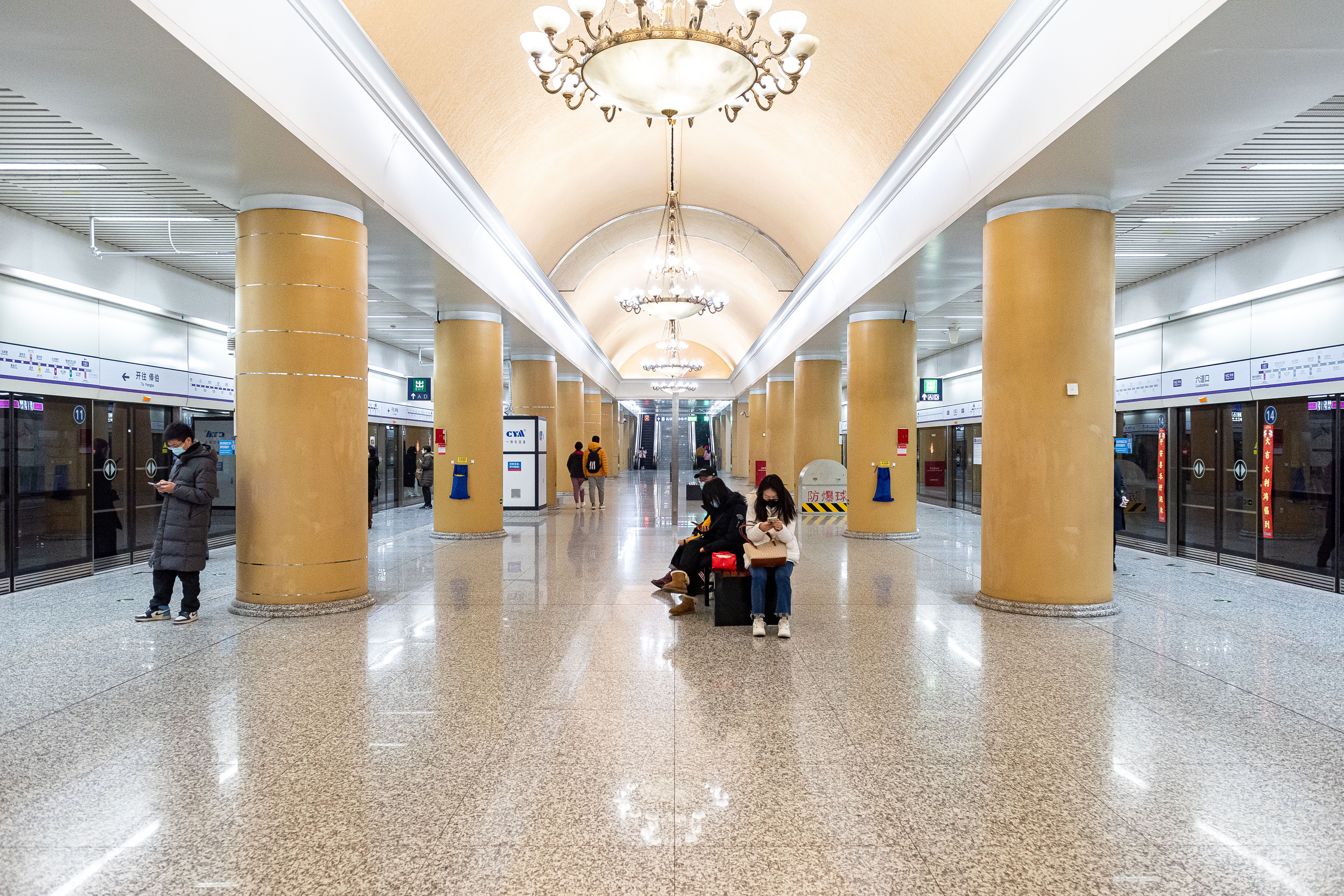
Liudaokou station platform

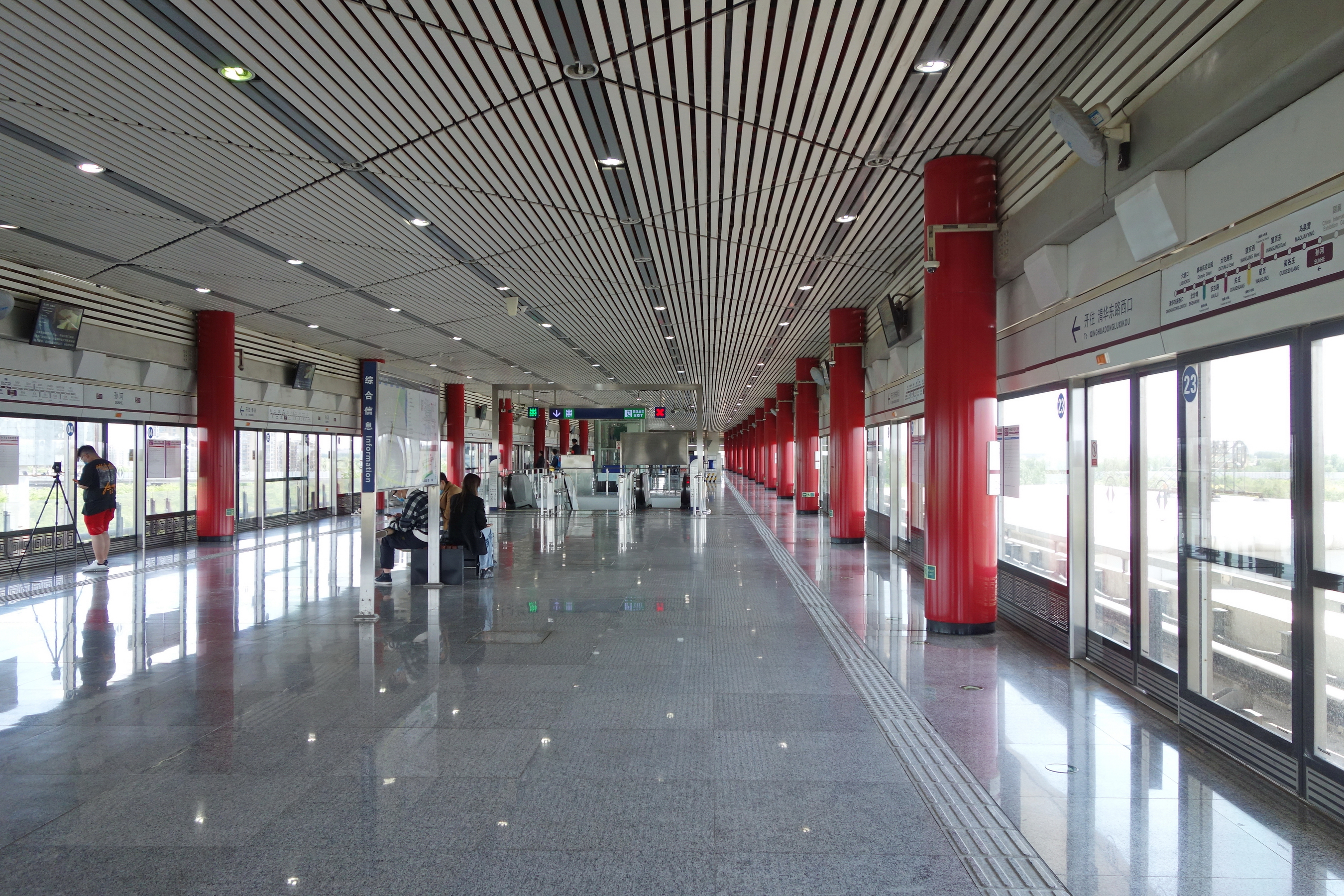
Sunhe station platform

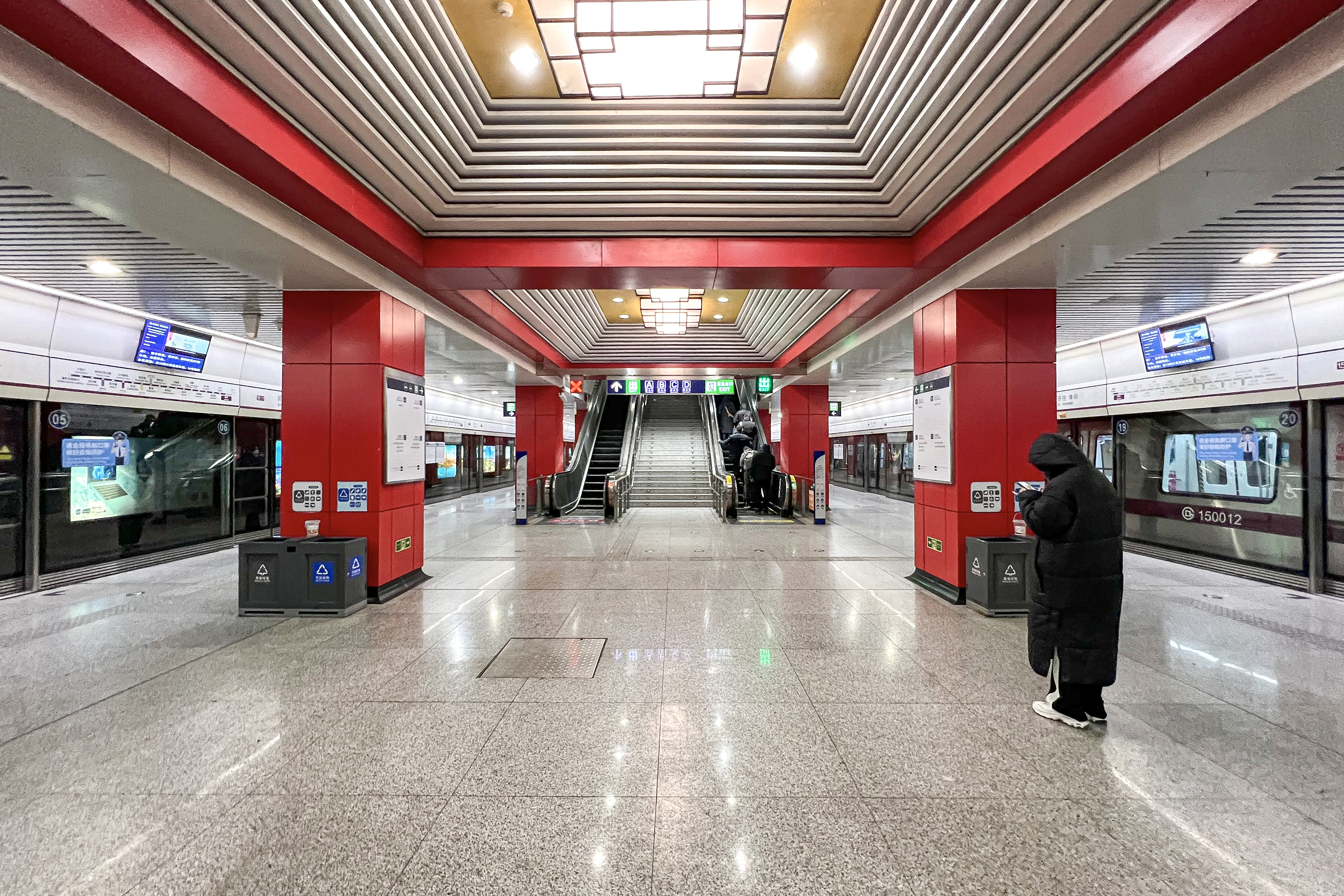
Shunyi station platform

Stations of Line 15
Station	Chinese name	Location	Transfers	Platform type	Grade	Opened
Qinghua Donglu Xikou	清华东路西口	Haidian		Side	Underground	28 December 2014
Liudaokou	六道口	Haidian	Changping	Island	Underground	28 December 2014
Beishatan	北沙滩	Haidian		Island	Underground	28 December 2014
Olympic Park	奥林匹克公园	Chaoyang	8	Island	Underground	28 December 2014
Anli Lu	安立路	Chaoyang		Island	Underground	28 December 2014
Datunludong	大屯路东	Chaoyang	5	Island	Underground	26 December 2015
Guanzhuang	关庄	Chaoyang		Island	Underground	28 December 2014
Wangjingxi	望京西	Chaoyang	13	Island	Underground	30 December 2010
Wangjing	望京	Chaoyang	14	Island	Underground	30 December 2010
Wangjingdong	望京东	Chaoyang		Island	Underground	31 December 2016
Cuigezhuang	崔各庄	Chaoyang		Island	Underground	30 December 2010
Maquanying	马泉营	Chaoyang		Dual-island	Underground	30 December 2010
Sunhe	孙河	Chaoyang		Island	Elevated	30 December 2010
China Int'l Exhibition Center	国展	Shunyi		Island	Elevated	30 December 2010
Hualikan	花梨坎	Shunyi		Island	Elevated	30 December 2010
Houshayu	后沙峪	Shunyi		Island	Elevated	30 December 2010
Nanfaxin	南法信	Shunyi		Island	Half Underground	31 December 2011
Shimen	石门	Shunyi		Island	Underground	31 December 2011
Shunyi	顺义	Shunyi		Island	Underground	31 December 2011
Fengbo	俸伯	Shunyi		Island	Underground	31 December 2011

== Line 16 ==
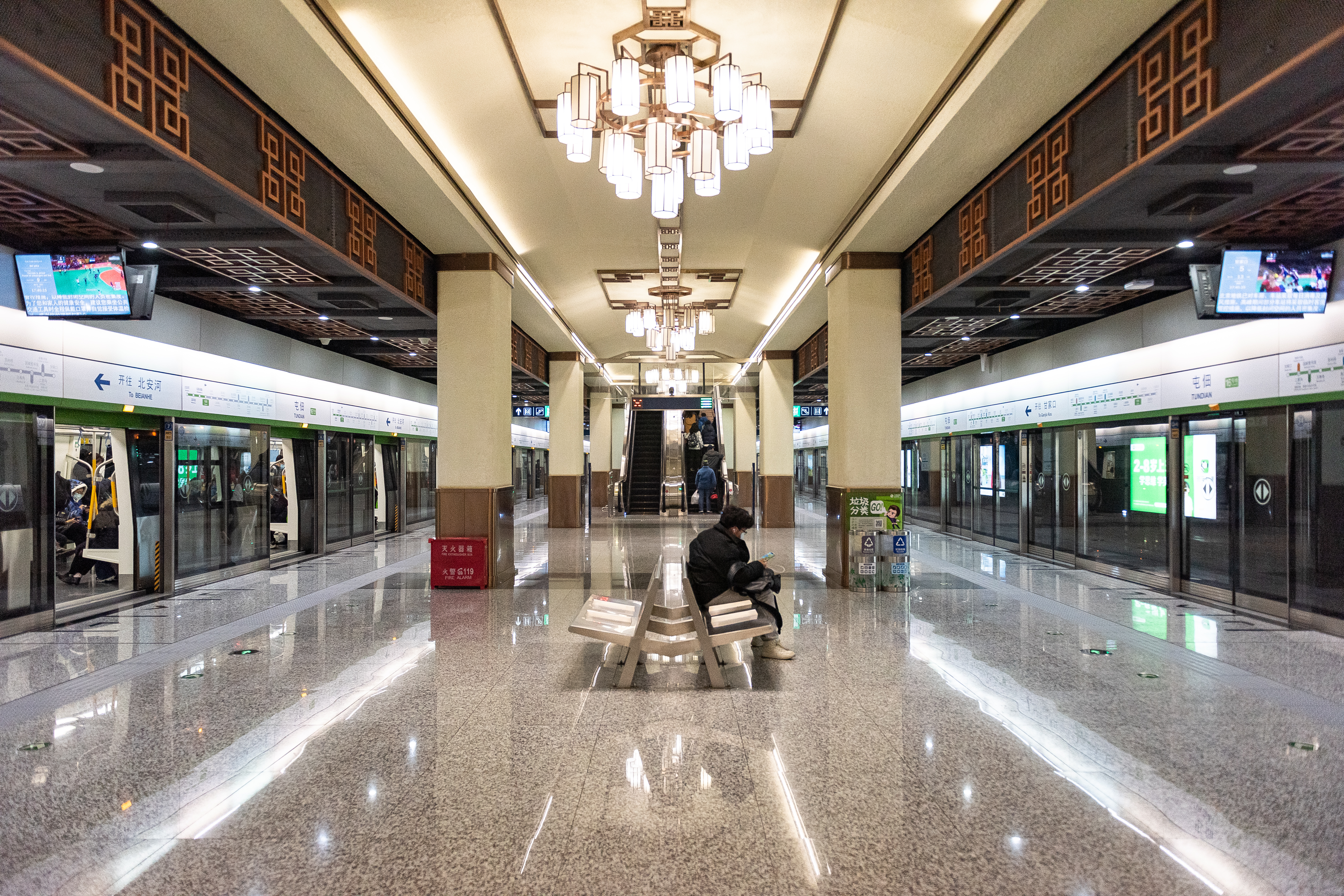
Tundian station platform

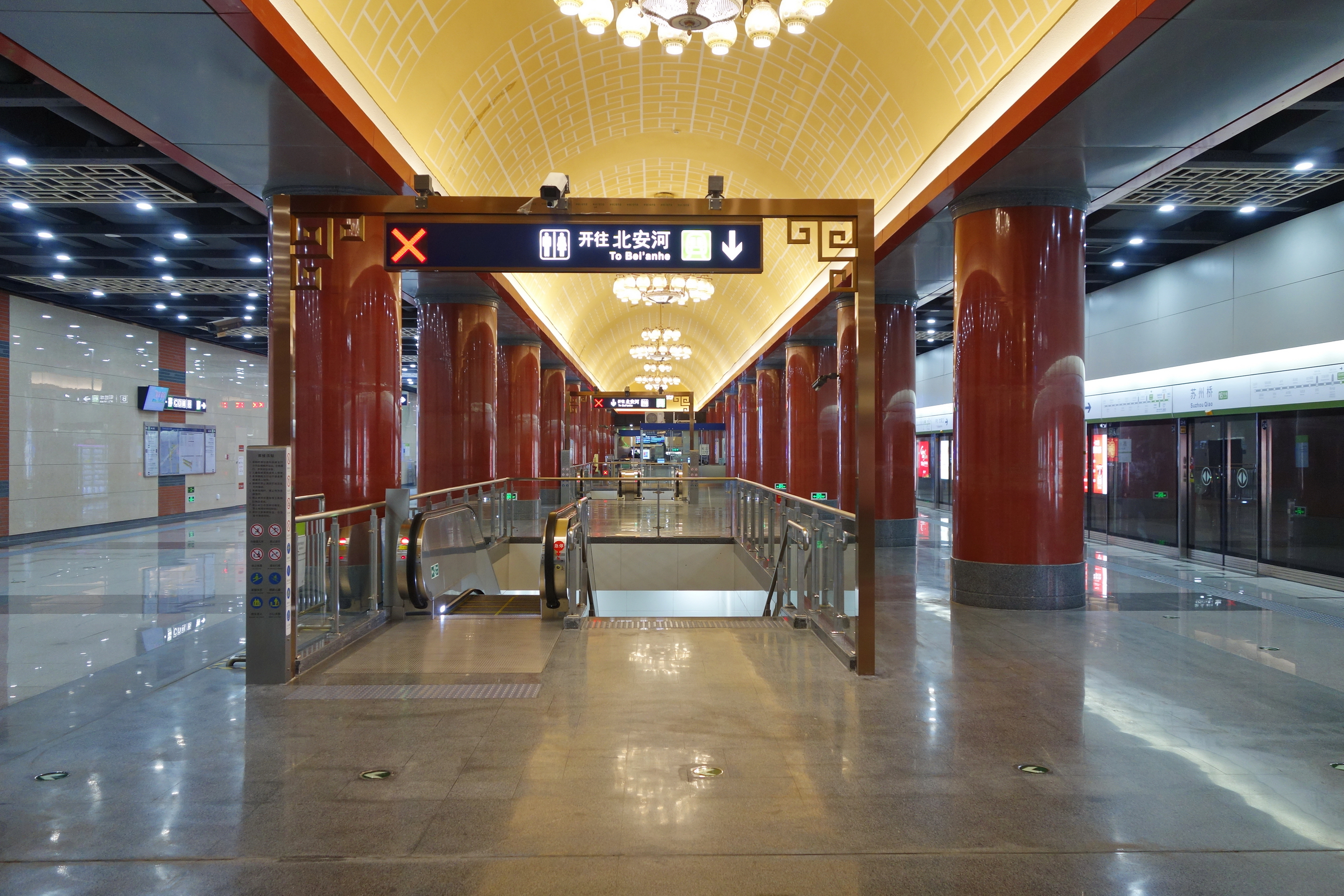
Suzhouqiao station platform

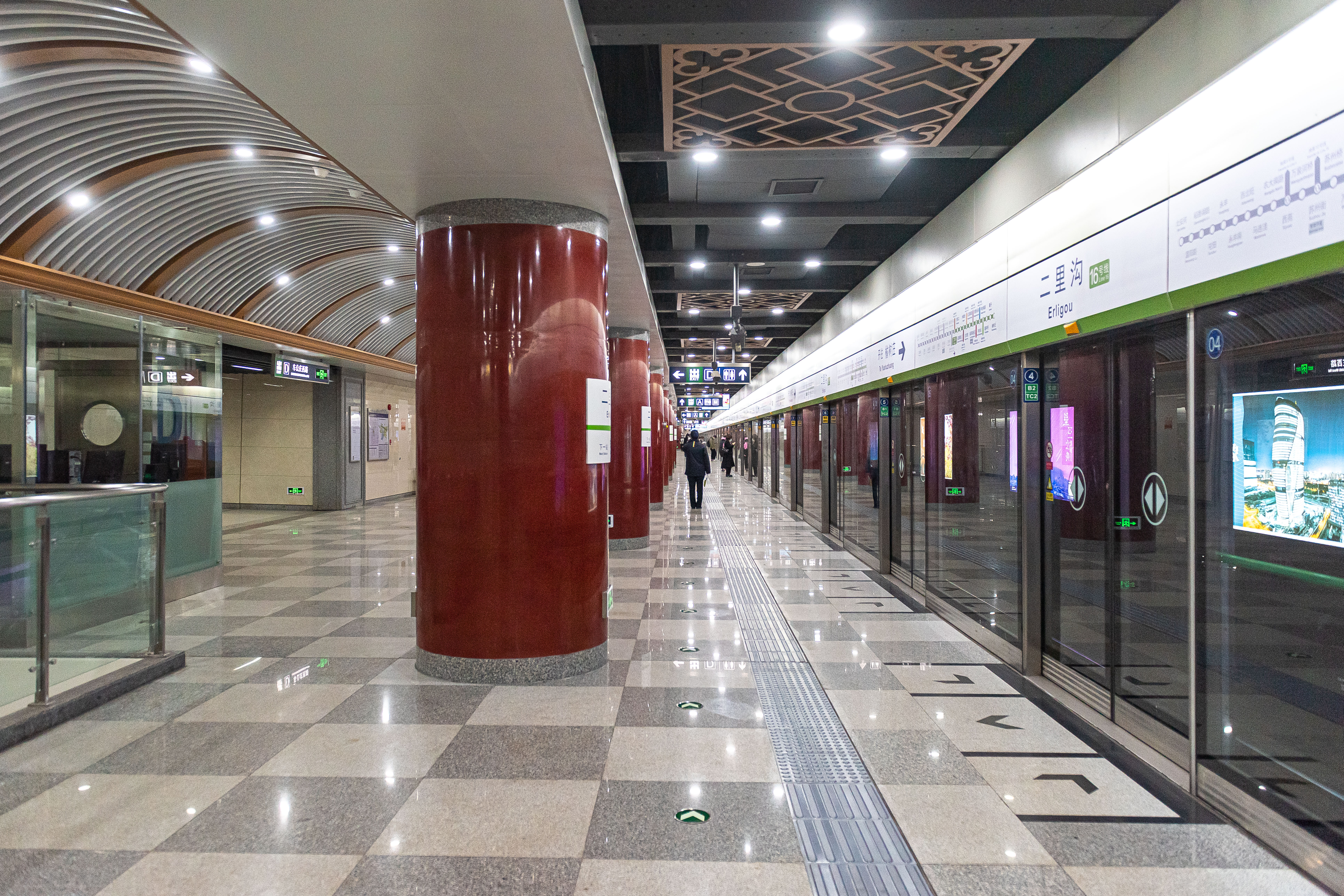
Erligou station southbound platform

Stations of Line 16
Station	Chinese name	Location	Transfers	Platform type	Grade	Opened
Bei'anhe	北安河	Haidian		Island	Underground	31 December 2016
Wenyang Lu	温阳路	Haidian		Island	Underground	31 December 2016
Daoxianghu Lu	稻香湖路	Haidian		Island	Underground	31 December 2016
Tundian	屯佃	Haidian		Island	Underground	31 December 2016
Yongfeng	永丰	Haidian		Island	Underground	31 December 2016
Yongfengnan	永丰南	Haidian		Island	Underground	31 December 2016
Xibeiwang	西北旺	Haidian		Island	Underground	31 December 2016
Malianwa	马连洼	Haidian		Island	Underground	31 December 2016
Nongda Nanlu	农大南路	Haidian		Island	Underground	30 December 2017
Xi Yuan	西苑	Haidian	4	Island	Underground	31 December 2016
Wanquanhe Qiao	万泉河桥	Haidian		Island	Underground	31 December 2020
Suzhou Jie	苏州街	Haidian	10	Island	Underground	30 December 2023
Suzhou Qiao	苏州桥	Haidian	12	Side	Underground	31 December 2020
Wanshou Si	万寿寺	Haidian		Island	Underground	31 December 2020
National Library	国家图书馆	Haidian	4 9	Island	Underground	31 December 2020
Erligou	二里沟	Haidian/Xicheng	6	Side	Underground	18 March 2023
Ganjiakou	甘家口	Haidian/Xicheng		Island	Underground	31 December 2020
Yuyuantan Dongmen (Yuyuantan Park East Gate)	玉渊潭东门	Haidian/Xicheng		Island	Underground	31 December 2021
Muxidi	木樨地	Haidian	1 (out-of-system interchange)	Island	Underground	31 December 2022
Daguanying	达官营	Xicheng	7	Island	Underground	31 December 2022
Honglian Nanlu	红莲南路	Xicheng		Island	Underground	31 December 2022
Lize Shangwuqu	丽泽商务区	Fengtai	14	Island	Underground	19 January 2025
Dongguantounan	东管头南	Fengtai	Fangshan	Island	Underground	31 December 2022
Fengtai railway station	丰台站	Fengtai	10; Beijing Fengtai	Island	Underground	31 December 2022
Fengtai Nanlu	丰台南路	Fengtai	9	Island	Underground	31 December 2022
Fufengqiao	富丰桥	Fengtai		Island	Underground	31 December 2022
Kandan	看丹	Fengtai		Island	Underground	31 December 2022
Yushuzhuang	榆树庄	Fengtai		Side	Underground	31 December 2022
Hongtaizhuang	洪泰庄	Fengtai		Island	Underground	30 December 2023
Wanpingcheng	宛平城	Fengtai		Island	Underground	30 December 2023

== Line 17 ==
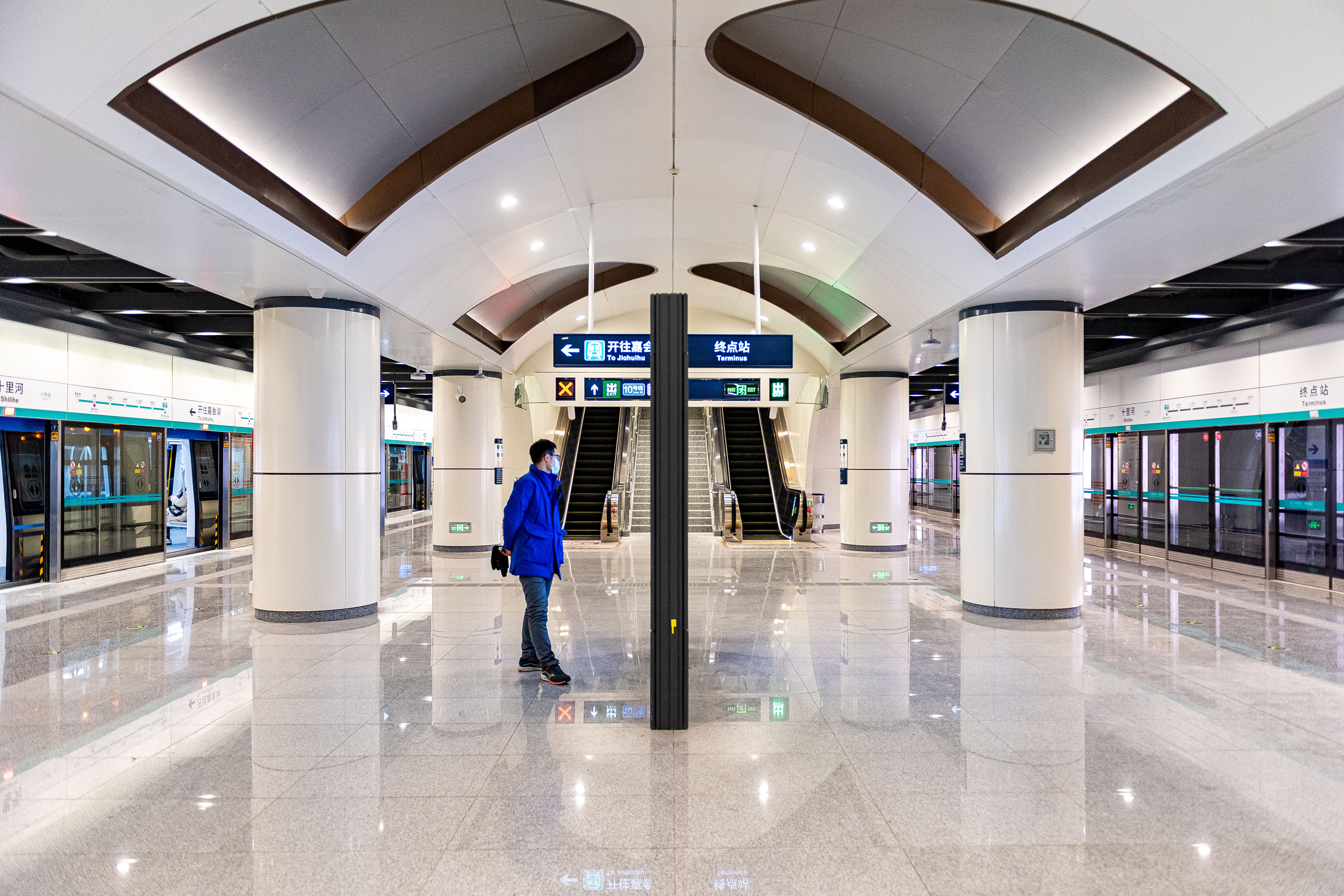
Shilihe station platform

Stations of Line 17
Station	Chinese name	Location	Transfers	Platform type	Grade	Opened
North section
Future Science City North	未来科学城北	Changping		Island	Underground	30 December 2023
Future Science City	未来科学城	Changping		Island	Underground	30 December 2023
Tiantongyuandong	天通苑东	Changping		Dual-island	Underground	30 December 2023
Qingheying	清河营	Chaoyang		Island	Underground	30 December 2023
Hongjunying	红军营	Chaoyang		Island	Underground	30 December 2023
Wangjingxi	望京西	Chaoyang	13 15	Island	Underground	Not open
Taiyanggong	太阳宫	Chaoyang	10	Island	Underground	30 December 2023
Xibahe	西坝河	Chaoyang	12	Island	Underground	30 December 2023
Zuojiazhuang	左家庄	Chaoyang		Island	Underground	30 December 2023
Workers' Stadium	工人体育场	Chaoyang	3	Island	Underground	30 December 2023
South section
Shilihe	十里河	Chaoyang	10 14	Island	Underground	31 December 2021
Zhoujiazhuang	周家庄	Chaoyang		Island	Underground	31 December 2021
Shibalidian	十八里店	Chaoyang		Dual-island	Underground	31 December 2021
Beishenshu	北神树	Tongzhou		Island	Underground	31 December 2021
Ciqubei	次渠北	Tongzhou		Island	Underground	31 December 2021
Ciqu	次渠	Tongzhou	Yizhuang	Island	Underground	31 December 2021
Jiahuihu	嘉会湖	Tongzhou		Island	Underground	31 December 2021

== Line 19 ==
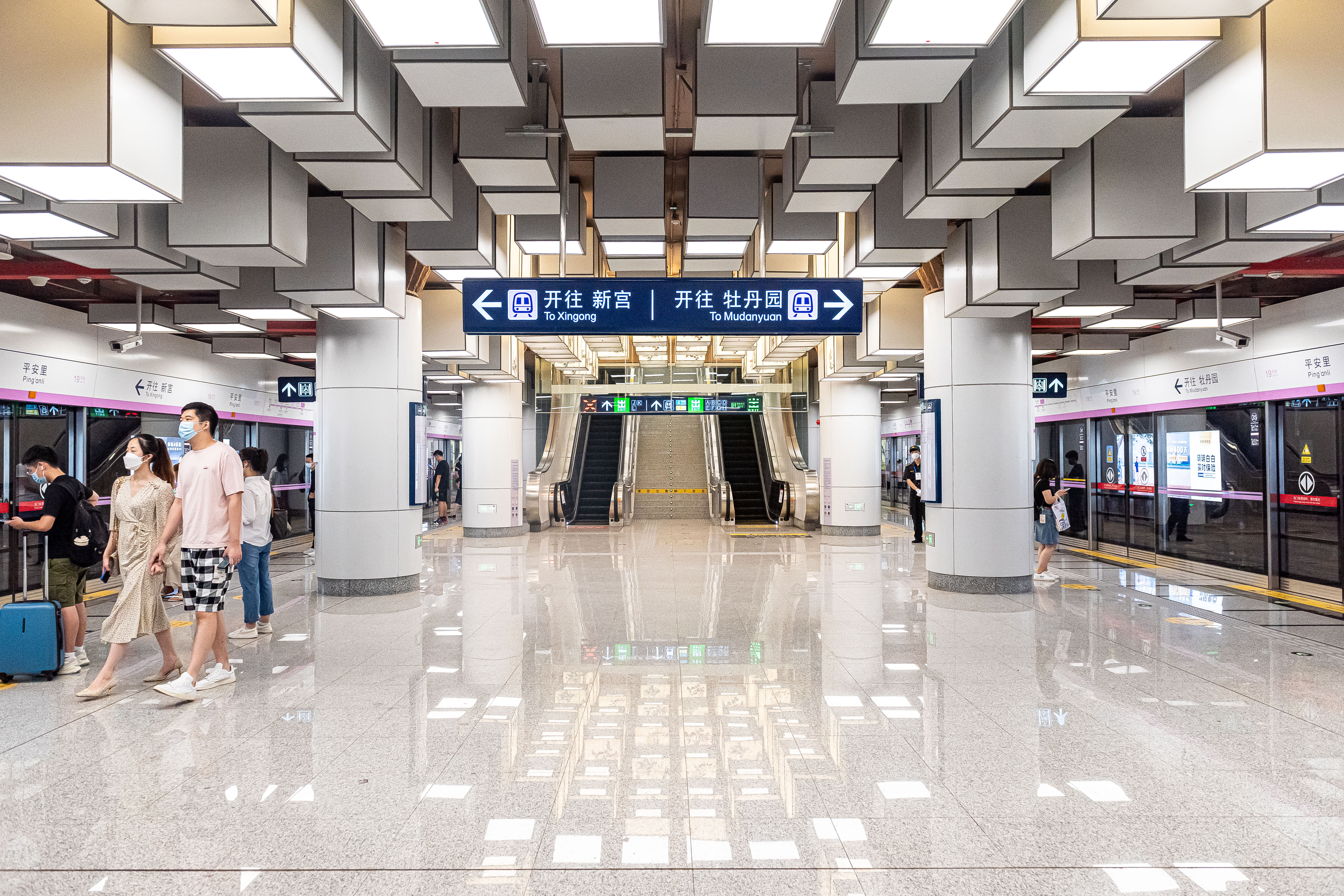
Ping'anli station platform

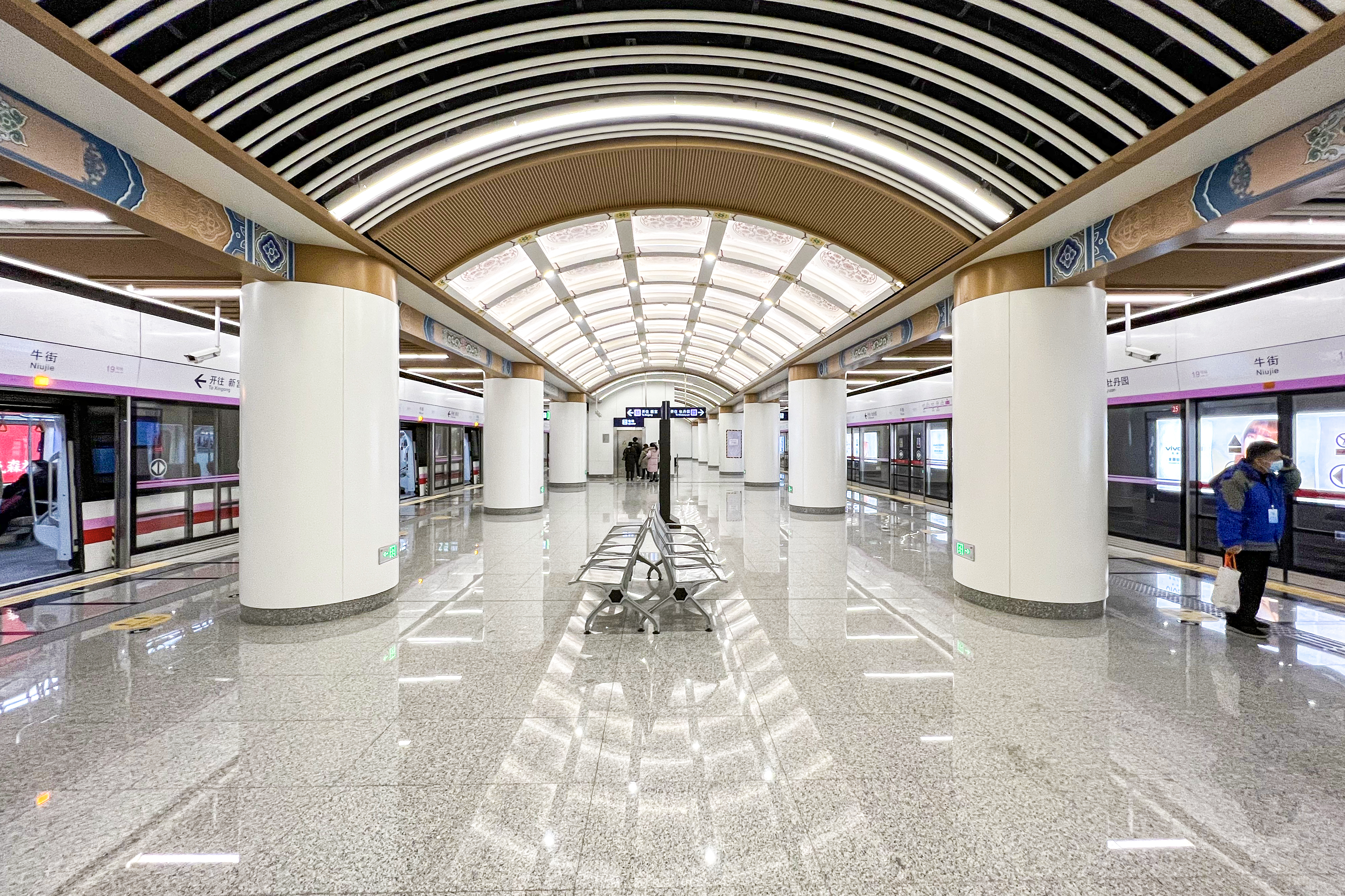
Niujie station platform

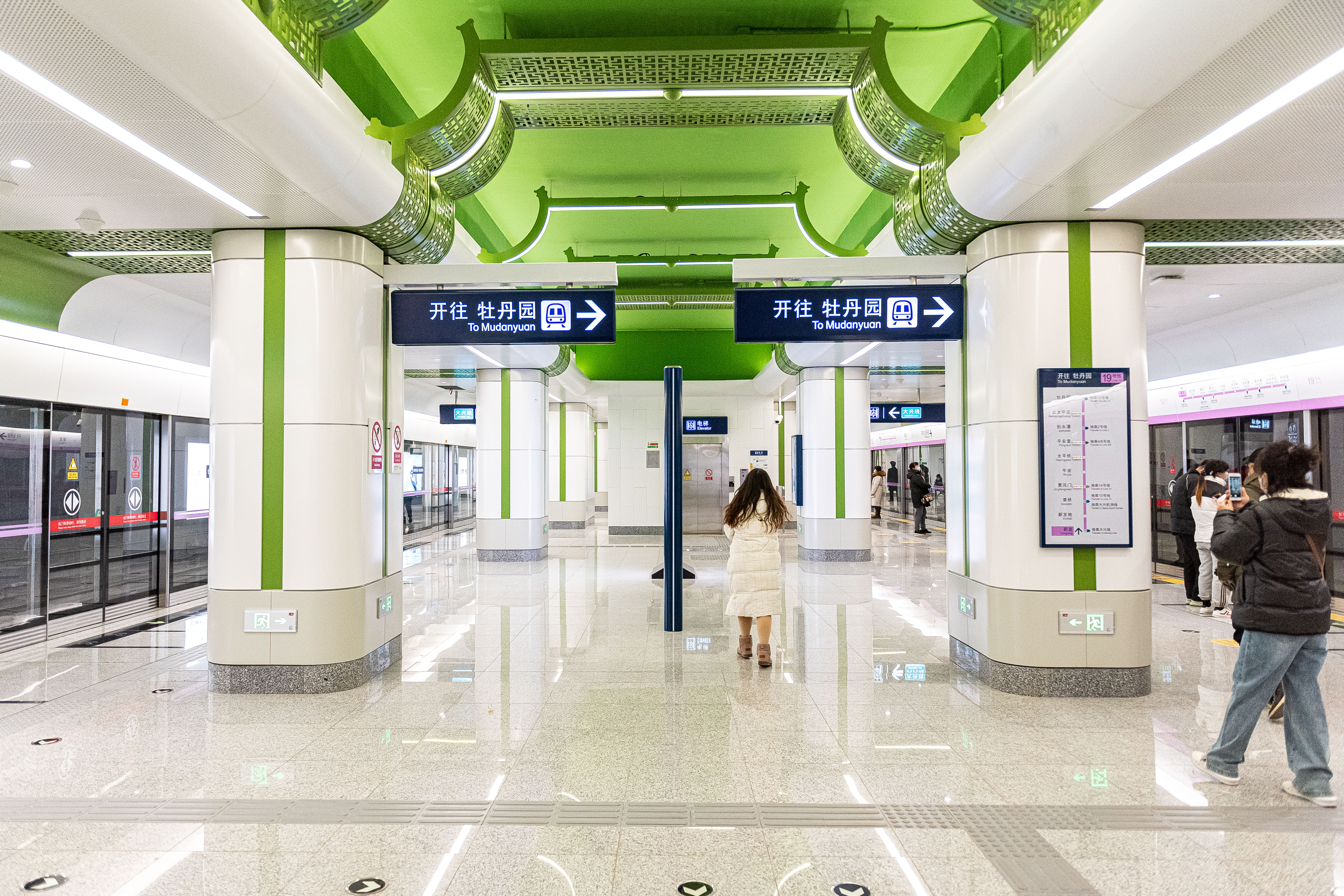
Xingong station northbound platform

Stations of Line 19
Station	Chinese name	Location	Transfers	Platform type	Grade	Opened
Mudanyuan	牡丹园	Haidian	10	Island	Underground	31 December 2021
Beitaipingzhuang	北太平庄	Haidian/Xicheng	12	Island	Underground	30 July 2022
Jishuitan	积水潭	Xicheng	2	Island	Underground	31 December 2021
Ping'anli	平安里	Xicheng	4 6	Island	Underground	30 July 2022
Taipingqiao	太平桥	Xicheng	1 2 (Out-of-system interchange via Fuxingmen)	Island	Underground	30 July 2022
Niujie	牛街	Xicheng	7 (Out-of-system interchange via Guang'anmennei)	Island	Underground	31 December 2021
Jingfengmen	景风门	Fengtai	14	Island	Underground	30 July 2022
Caoqiao	草桥	Fengtai	10 Daxing Airport	Island	Underground	31 December 2021
Xinfadi	新发地	Fengtai		Island	Underground	31 December 2021
Xingong	新宫	Fengtai	Daxing	Dual-island	Underground	31 December 2021

== Changping Line ==
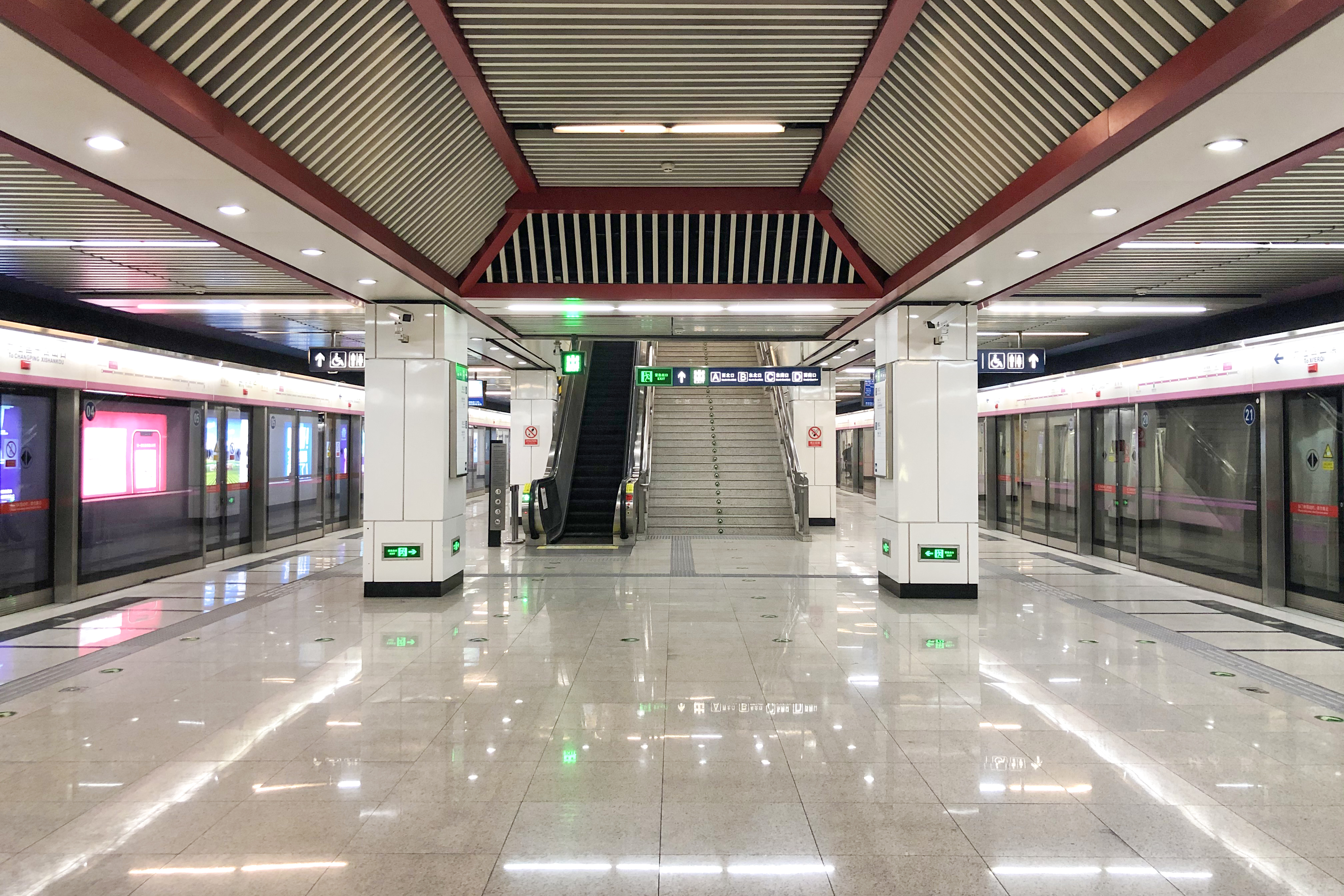
Ming Tombs station platform

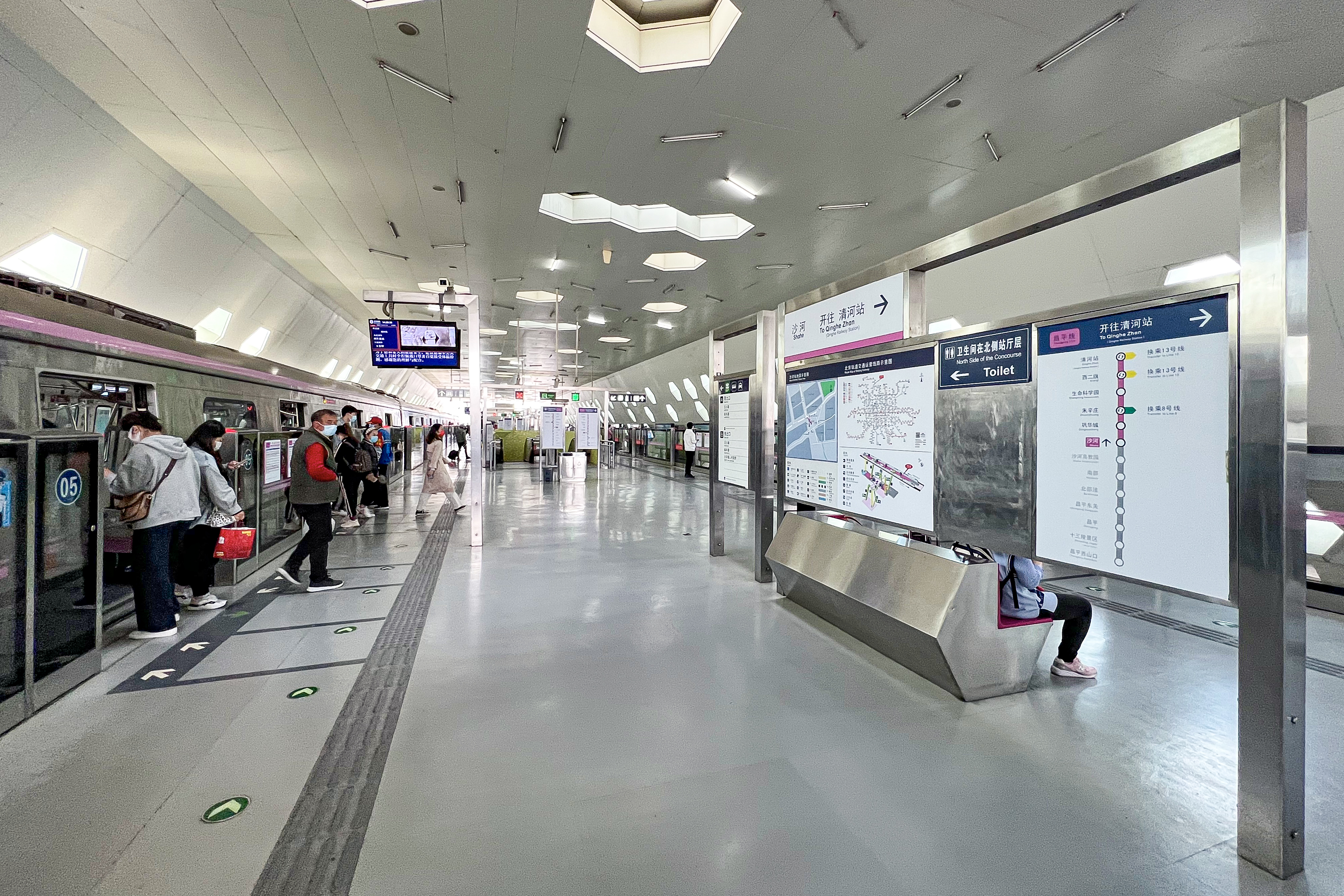
Shahe station platform

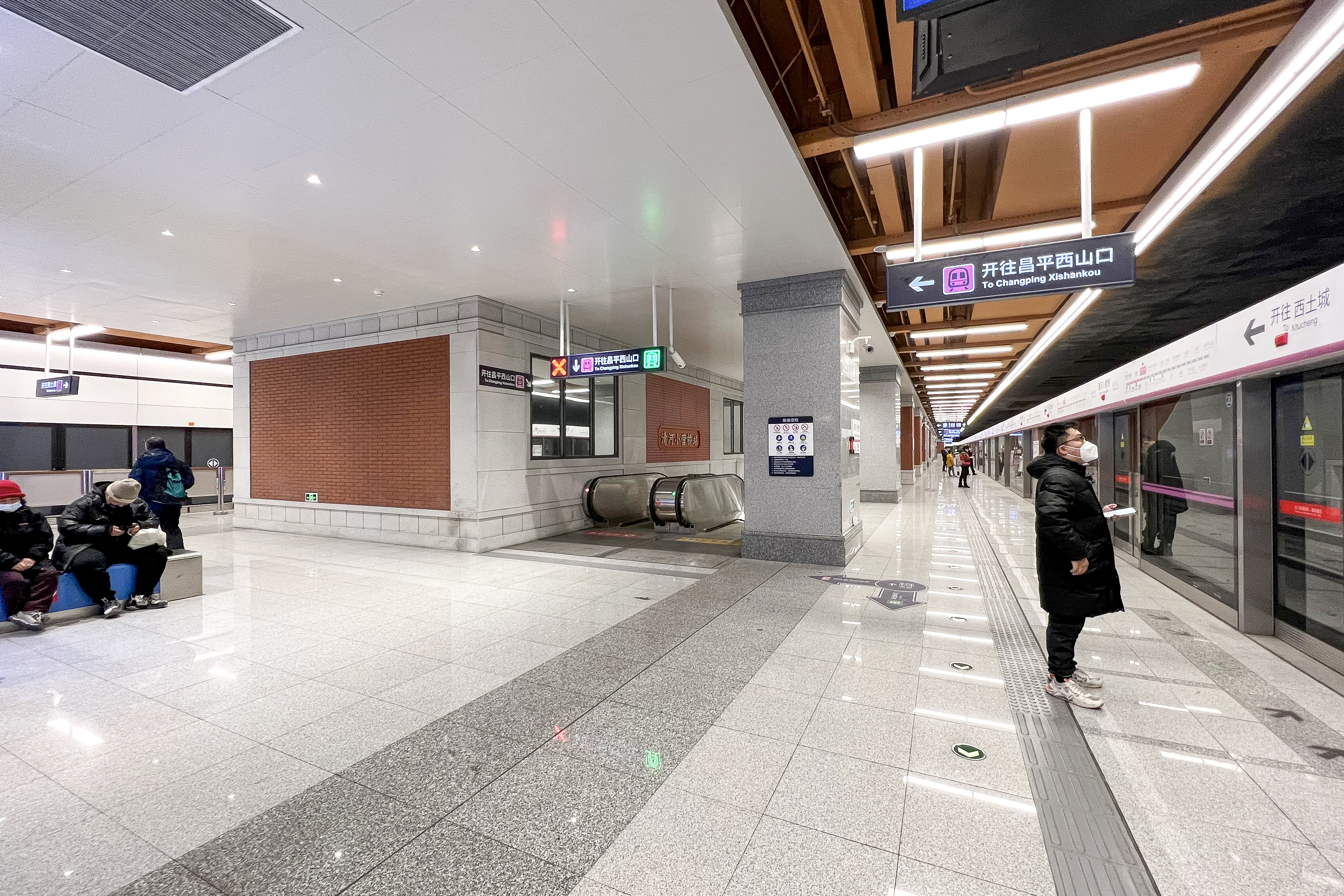
Qinghe Xiaoyingqiao station southbound platform

Stations of Changping Line
Station	Chinese name	Location	Transfers	Platform type	Grade	Opened
Changping Xishankou	昌平西山口	Changping		Island	Underground	26 December 2015
Ming Tombs	十三陵景区	Changping		Island	Underground	26 December 2015
Changping	昌平	Changping		Island	Underground	26 December 2015
Changping Dongguan	昌平东关	Changping		Island	Underground	26 December 2015
Beishaowa	北邵洼	Changping		Island	Underground	26 December 2015
Nanshao	南邵	Changping		Island	Underground	30 December 2010
Shahe Univ. Park	沙河高教园	Changping		Island	Elevated	30 December 2010
Shahe	沙河	Changping		Island	Elevated	30 December 2010
Gonghuacheng	巩华城	Changping		Island	Elevated	30 December 2010
Zhuxinzhuang	朱辛庄	Changping	8	Cross-platform	Elevated	30 December 2010
Life Science Park	生命科学园	Changping		Island	Elevated	30 December 2010
Xi'erqi	西二旗	Haidian	13	Side	Elevated	30 December 2010
Qinghe railway station	清河站	Haidian	13 Huairou–Miyun; Qinghe	Island	Underground	31 December 2021
Zhufangbei	朱房北	Haidian		Island	Underground	15 December 2024
Qinghe Xiaoyingqiao	清河小营桥	Haidian		Cross-platform	Underground	4 February 2023
Xuezhiyuan	学知园	Haidian		Island	Underground	4 February 2023
Liudaokou	六道口	Haidian	15	Island	Underground	4 February 2023
Xueyuanqiao	学院桥	Haidian		Island	Underground	4 February 2023
Xitucheng	西土城	Haidian	10	Island	Underground	4 February 2023
Jimenqiao	蓟门桥	Haidian	12	Island	Underground	15 December 2024

== Fangshan Line ==
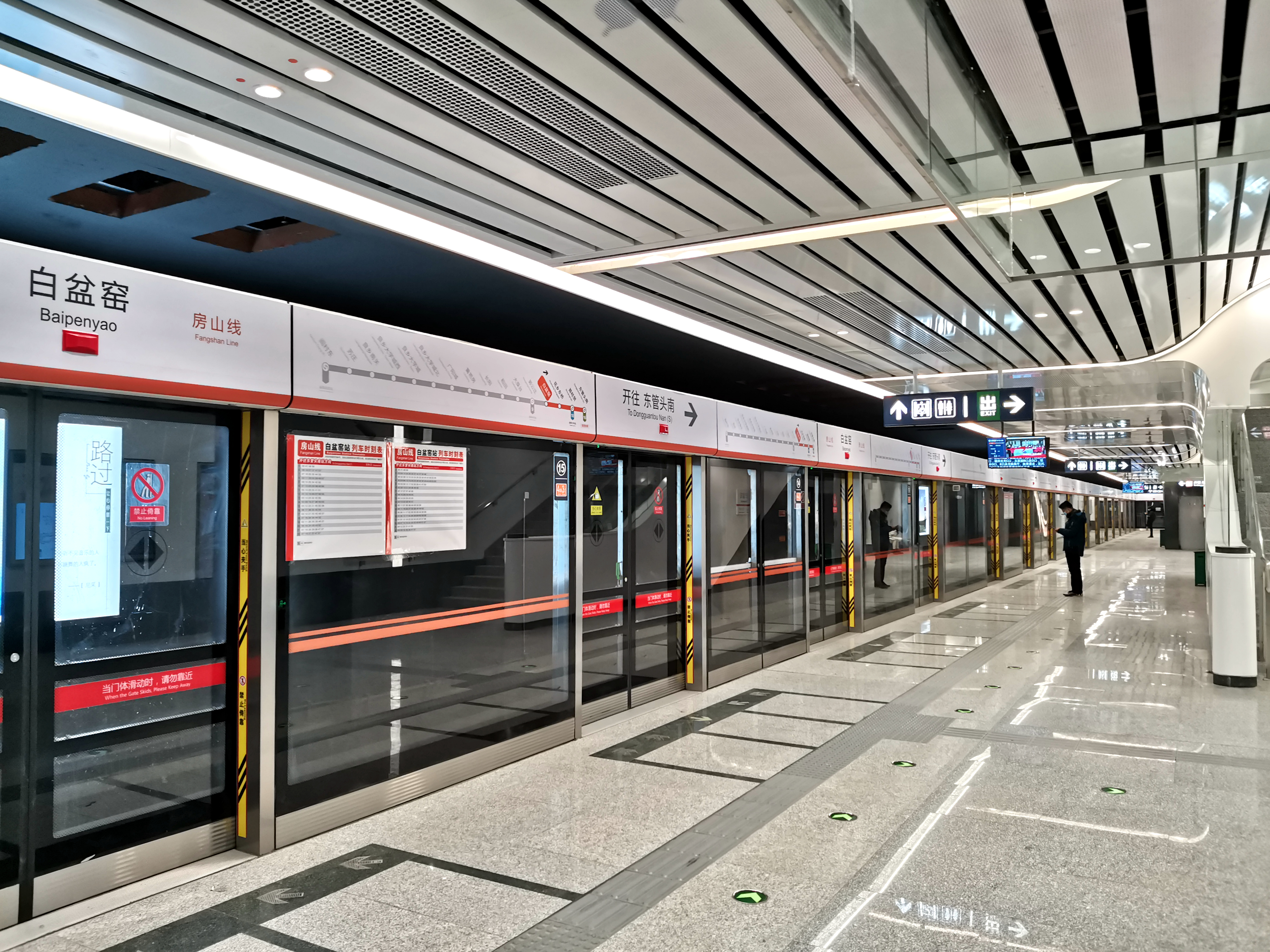
Baipenyao station platform

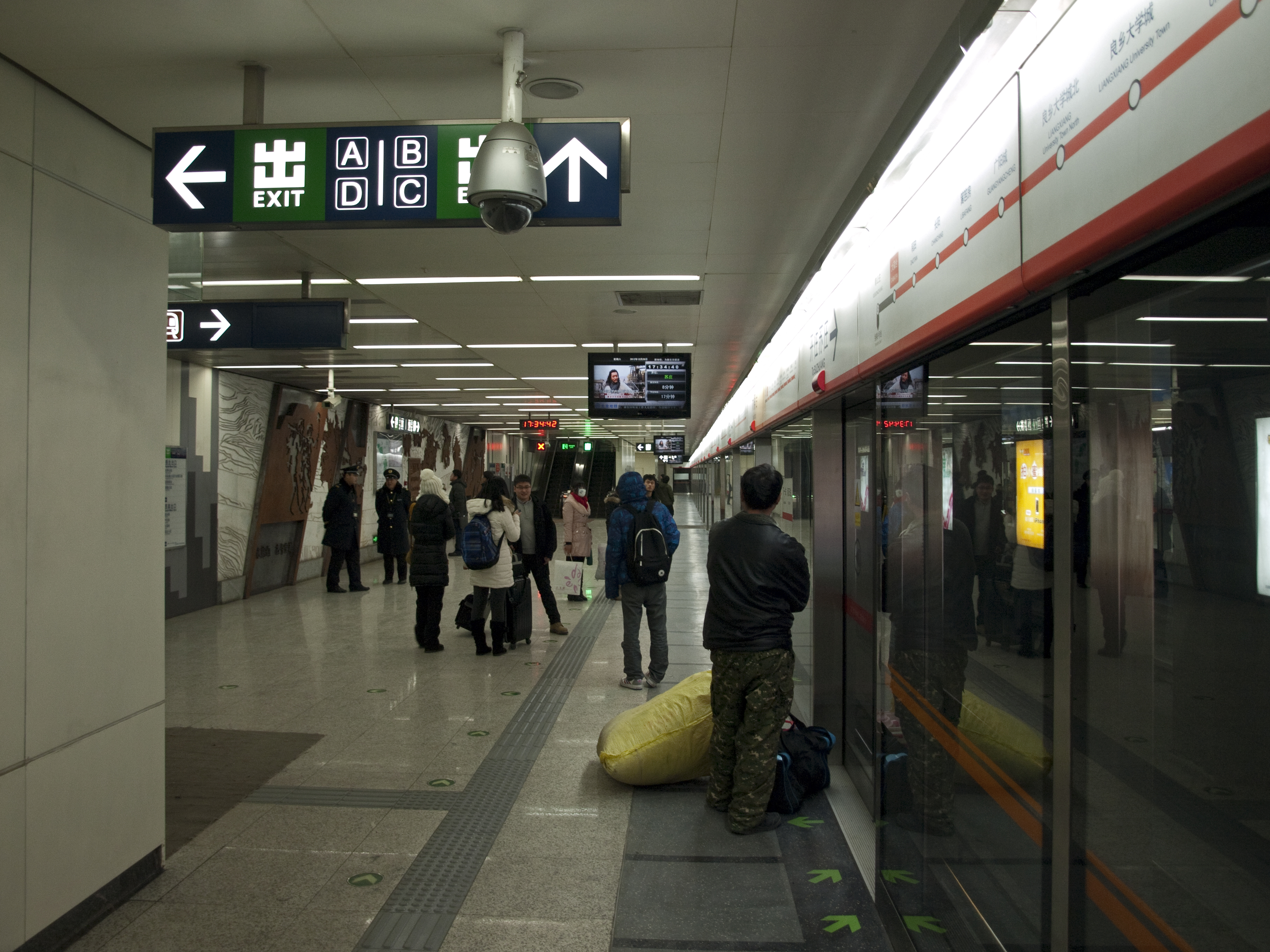
Dabaotai station platform

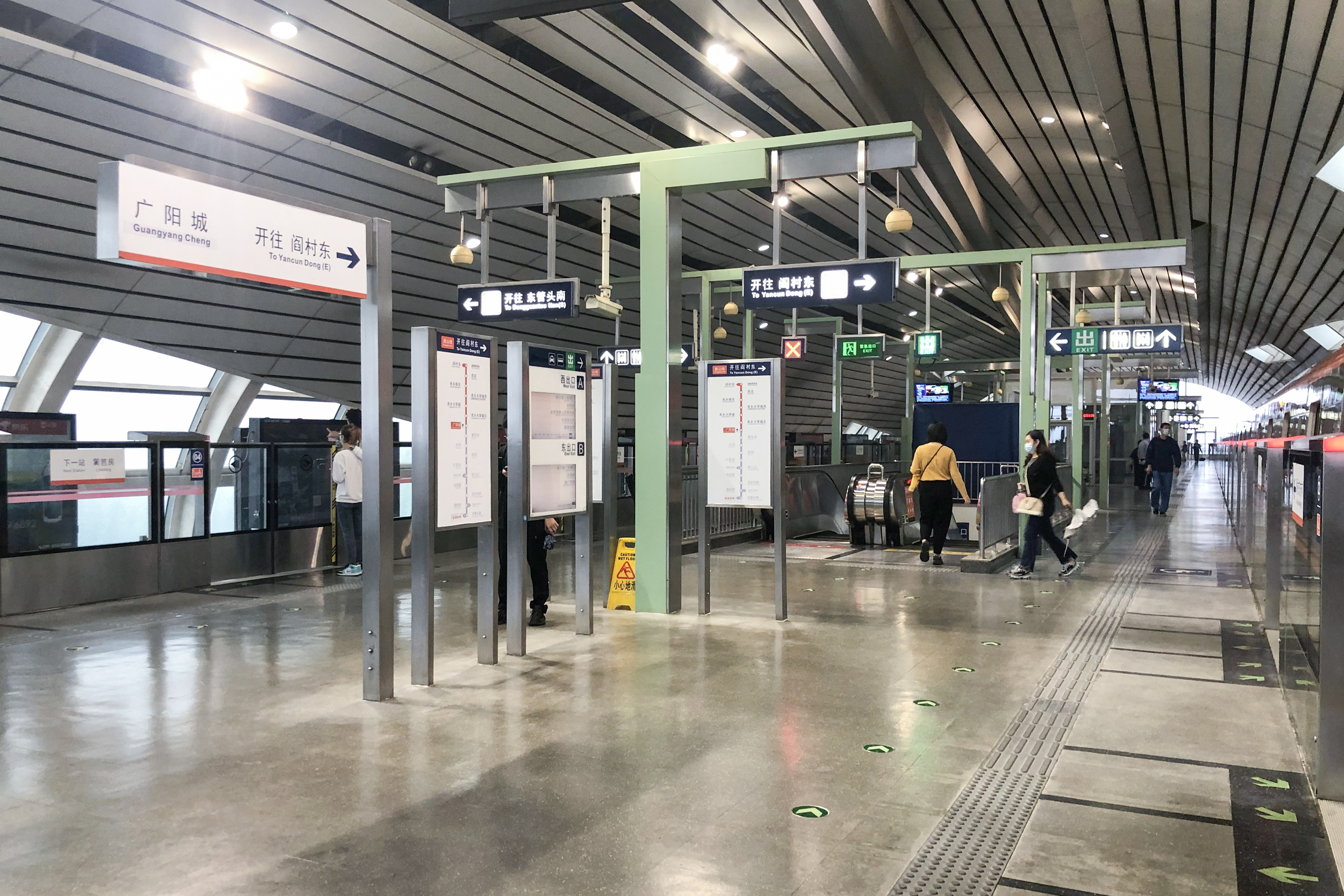
Guangyangcheng station platform

Stations of Fangshan Line
Station	Chinese name	Location	Transfers	Platform type	Grade	Opened
Dongguantounan	东管头南	Fengtai	16	Island	Underground	31 December 2020
Capital Univ. of Economics & Business	首经贸	Fengtai	10	Island	Underground	31 December 2020
Huaxiang Dongqiao	花乡东桥	Fengtai		Island	Underground	31 December 2020
Baipenyao	白盆窑	Fengtai		Side	Underground	31 December 2020
Guogongzhuang	郭公庄	Fengtai	9	Dual-Island	Underground	31 December 2011
Dabaotai	大葆台	Fengtai		Side	Half Underground	30 December 2010
Daotian	稻田	Fangshan		Island	Elevated	30 December 2010
Changyang	长阳	Fangshan		Island	Elevated	30 December 2010
Libafang	篱笆房	Fangshan		Island	Elevated	30 December 2010
Guangyangcheng	广阳城	Fangshan		Island	Elevated	30 December 2010
Liangxiang Univ. Town North	良乡大学城北	Fangshan		Island	Elevated	30 December 2010
Liangxiang Univ. Town	良乡大学城	Fangshan		Island	Elevated	30 December 2010
Liangxiang Univ. Town West	良乡大学城西	Fangshan		Island	Elevated	30 December 2010
Liangxiang Nanguan	良乡南关	Fangshan		Side	Elevated	30 December 2010
Suzhuang	苏庄	Fangshan		Side	Elevated	30 December 2010
Yancundong	阎村东	Fangshan	Yanfang	Dual-island	Elevated	30 December 2017

== Line S1 ==
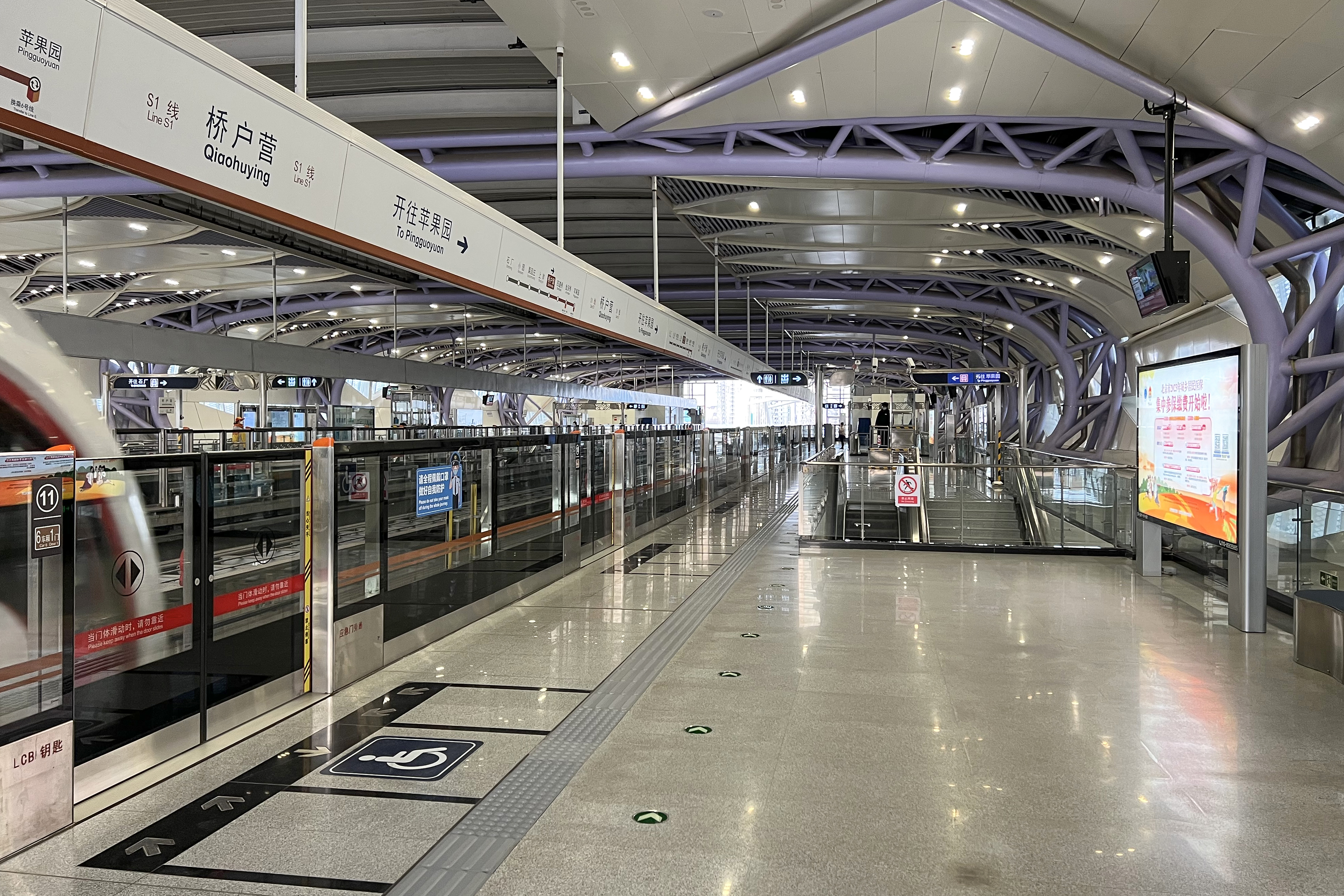
Qiaohuying station eastbound platform

Stations of Line S1
Station	Chinese name	Location	Transfers	Platform type	Grade	Opened
Shichang	石厂	Mentougou		Side	Elevated	30 December 2017
Xiaoyuan	小园	Mentougou		Side	Elevated	30 December 2017
Liyuanzhuang	栗园庄	Mentougou		Side	Elevated	30 December 2017
Shang'an	上岸	Mentougou		Side	Elevated	30 December 2017
Qiaohuying	桥户营	Mentougou		Side	Elevated	30 December 2017
Sidaoqiao	四道桥	Mentougou		Side	Elevated	30 December 2017
Jin'anqiao	金安桥	Shijingshan	6 11	Side	Elevated	30 December 2017
Pingguoyuan	苹果园	Shijingshan	6	Side	Elevated	31 December 2021

== Xijiao Line ==
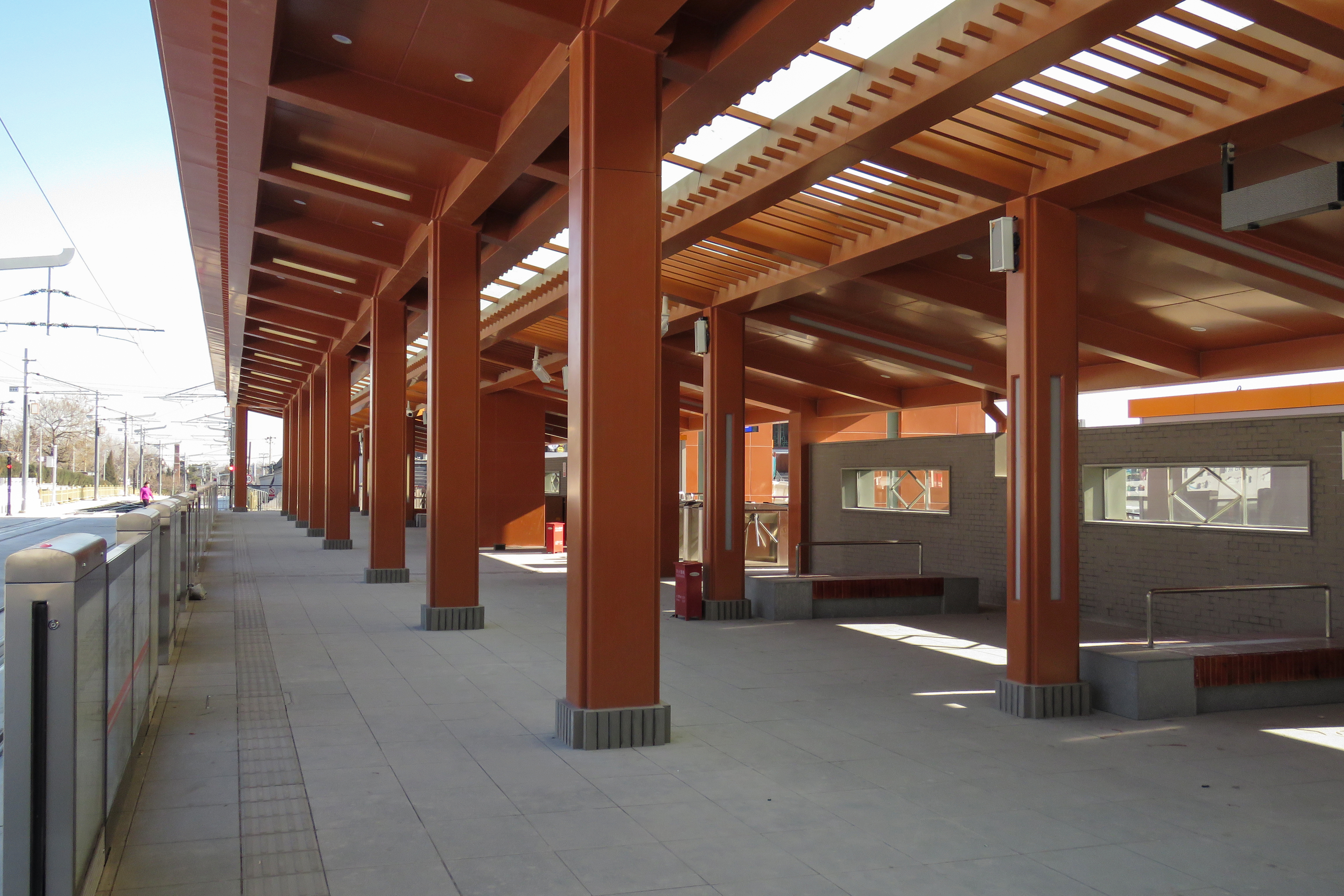
Xiangshan station platform

Stations of Xijiao Line
Station	Chinese name	Location	Transfers	Platform type	Grade	Opened
Bagou	巴沟	Haidian	10	Single-sided	At-grade	30 December 2017
Summer Palace West Gate	颐和园西门	Haidian		Side	At-grade	30 December 2017
Chapeng	茶棚	Haidian		Side	At-grade	30 December 2017
Wan'an	万安	Haidian		Side	At-grade	30 December 2017
Botanical Garden	植物园	Haidian		Side	At-grade	30 December 2017
Fragrant Hills	香山	Haidian		Single-sided	At-grade	30 December 2017

== Yanfang Line ==
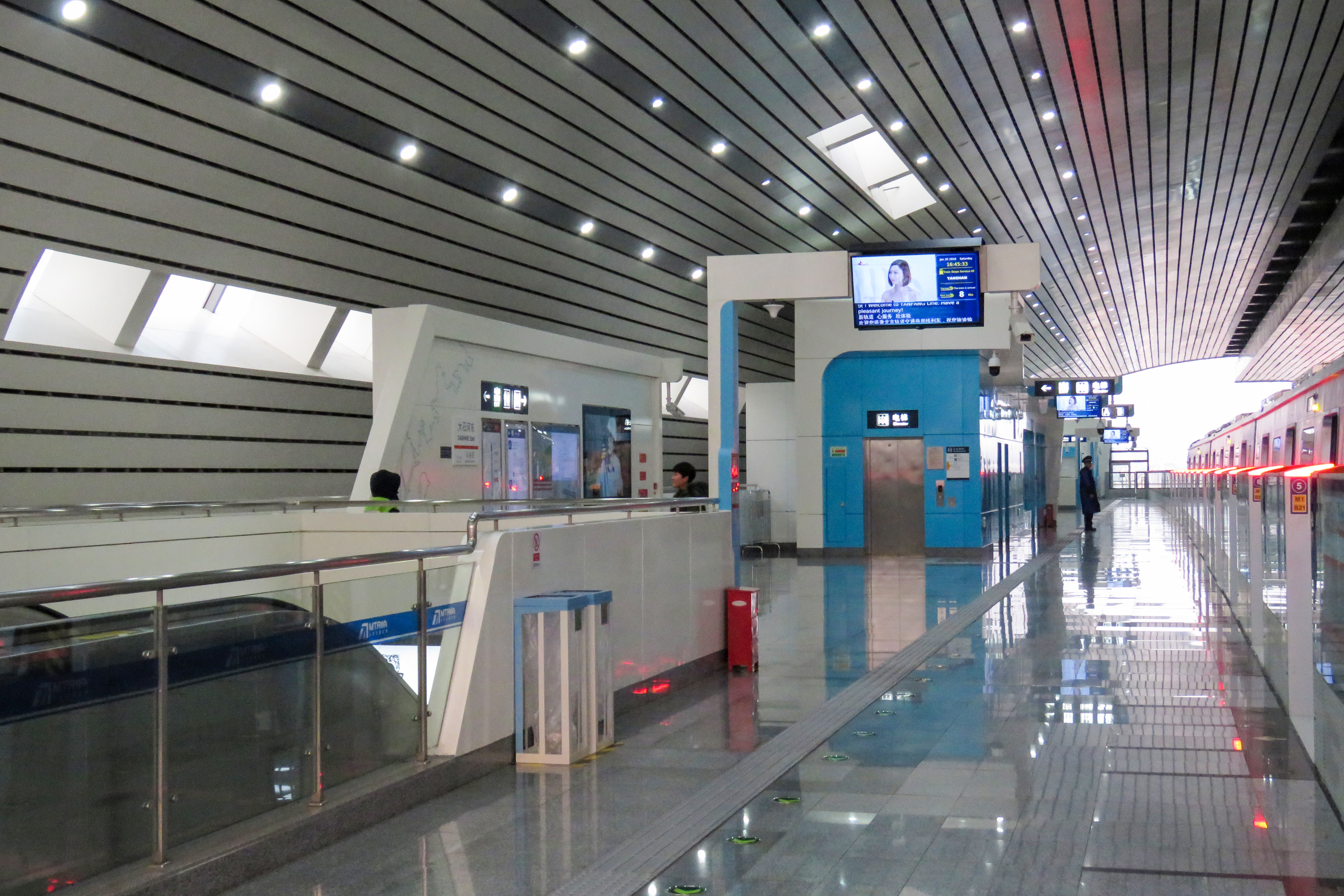
Dashihedong station platform

Stations of Yanfang Line
Station	Chinese name	Location	Transfers	Platform type	Grade	Opened
Yancundong	阎村东	Fangshan	Fangshan	Dual-island	Elevated	30 December 2017
Zicaowu	紫草坞	Fangshan		Island	Elevated	30 December 2017
Yancun	阎村	Fangshan		Island	Elevated	30 December 2017
Xingcheng	星城	Fangshan		Island	Elevated	30 December 2017
Dashihedong	大石河东	Fangshan		Side	Elevated	30 December 2017
Magezhuang	马各庄	Fangshan		Island	Elevated	30 December 2017
Raolefu	饶乐府	Fangshan		Side/island hybrid	Elevated	30 December 2017
Fangshan Chengguan	房山城关	Fangshan		Island	Elevated	30 December 2017
Yanshan	燕山	Fangshan		Island	Elevated	30 December 2017

== Yizhuang Line ==
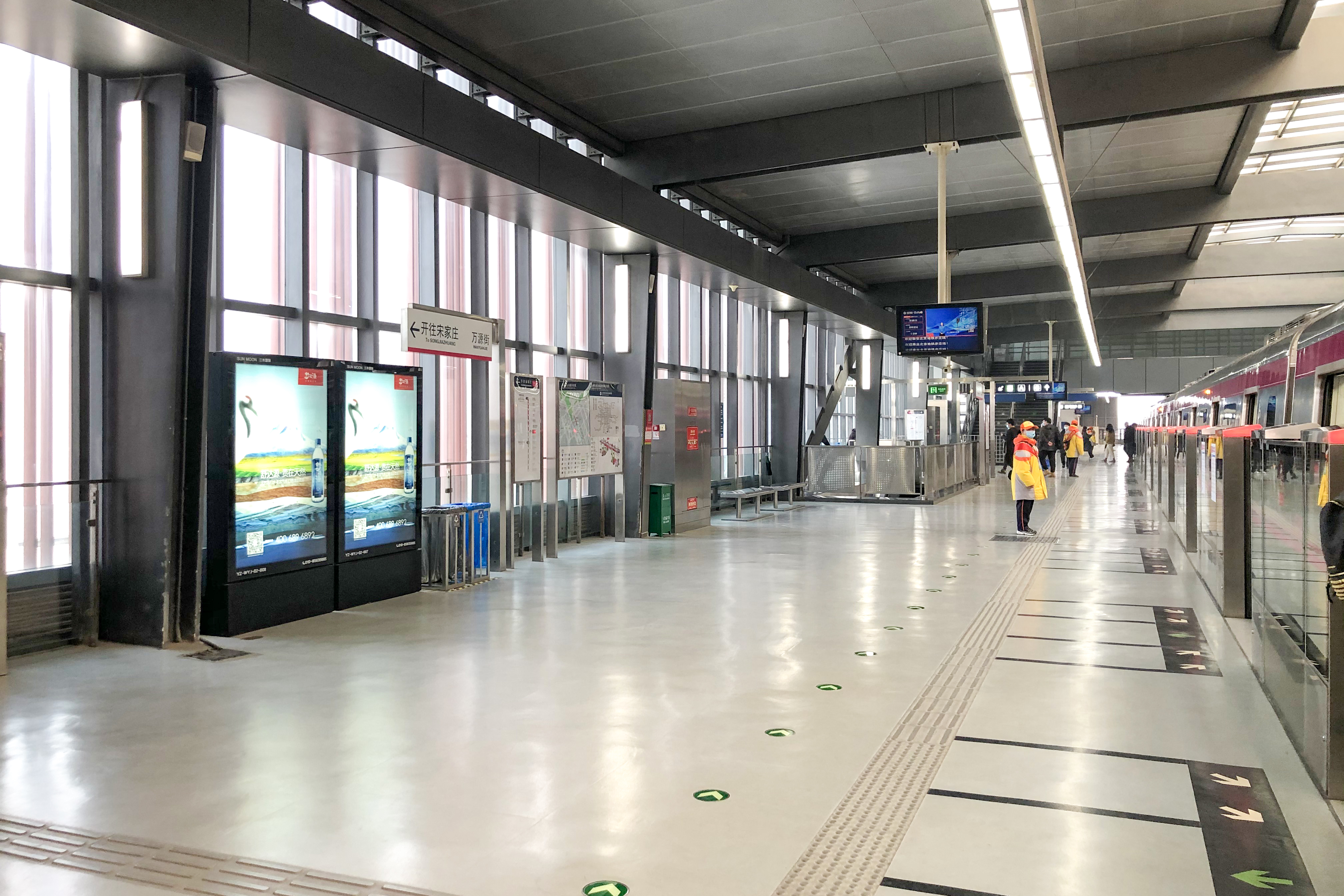
Wanyuan Jie station northbound platform

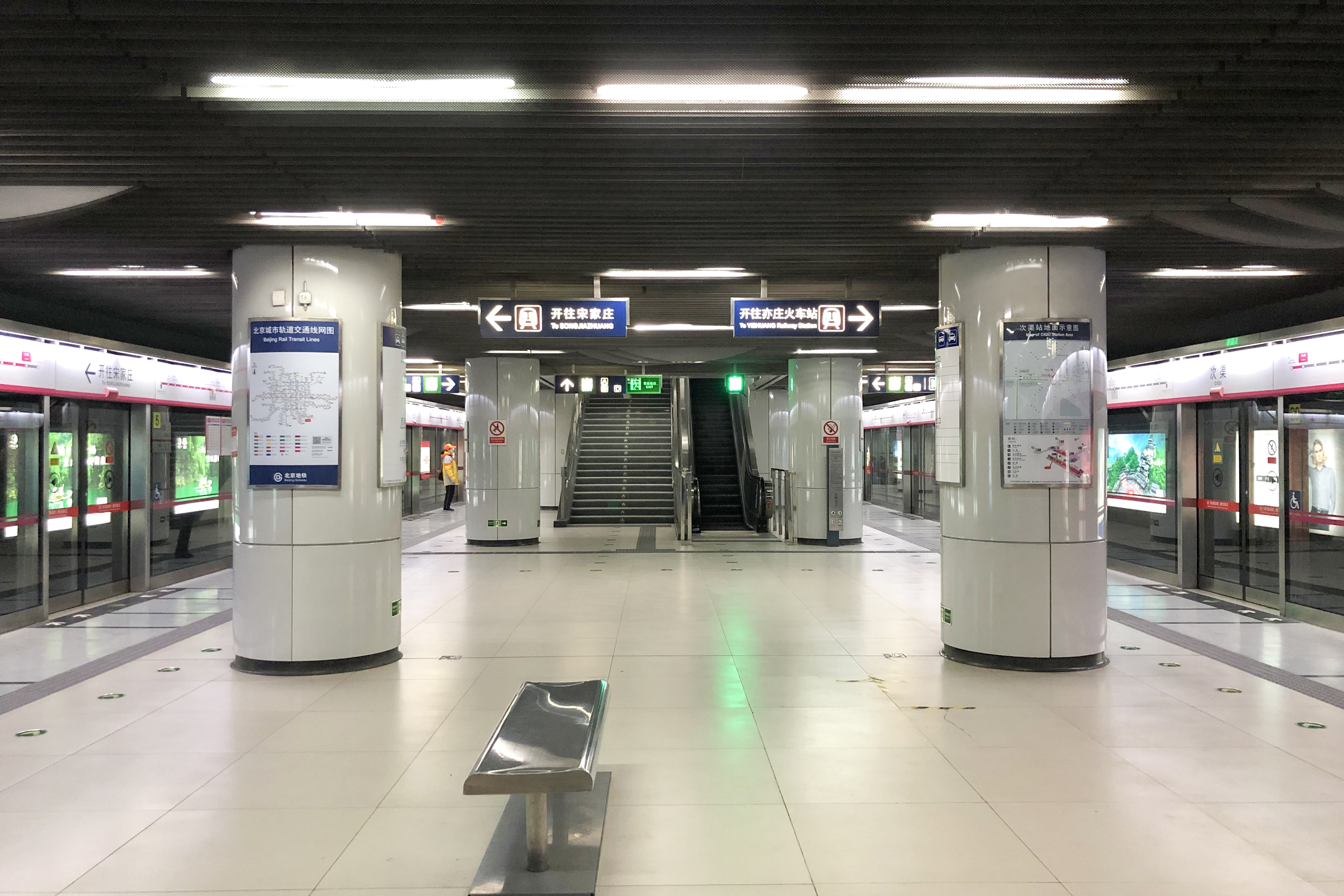
Ciqu station platform

Stations of Yizhuang Line
Station	Chinese name	Location	Transfers	Platform type	Grade	Opened
Songjiazhuang	宋家庄	Fengtai	5 10	Spanish solution	Underground	30 December 2010
Xiaocun	肖村	Chaoyang		Island	Underground	30 December 2010
Xiaohongmen	小红门	Chaoyang		Island	Underground	30 December 2010
Jiugong	旧宫	Daxing		Side	Elevated	30 December 2010
Yizhuangqiao	亦庄桥	Daxing		Side	Elevated	30 December 2010
Yizhuang Culture Park	亦庄文化园	Daxing		Side	Elevated	30 December 2010
Wanyuan Jie	万源街	Daxing		Side	Elevated	30 December 2010
Rongjing Dongjie	荣京东街	Daxing		Side	Elevated	30 December 2010
Rongchang Dongjie	荣昌东街	Daxing	Yizhuang T1	Side	Elevated	30 December 2010
Tongji Nanlu	同济南路	Tongzhou		Side/island hybrid	Elevated	30 December 2010
Jinghai Lu	经海路	Tongzhou		Side	Elevated	30 December 2010
Ciqunan	次渠南	Tongzhou		Island	Underground	30 December 2010
Ciqu	次渠	Tongzhou	17	Island	Underground	30 December 2010
Yizhuang railway station	亦庄火车站	Tongzhou		Island	Underground	30 December 2018

== Yizhuang T1 Line ==
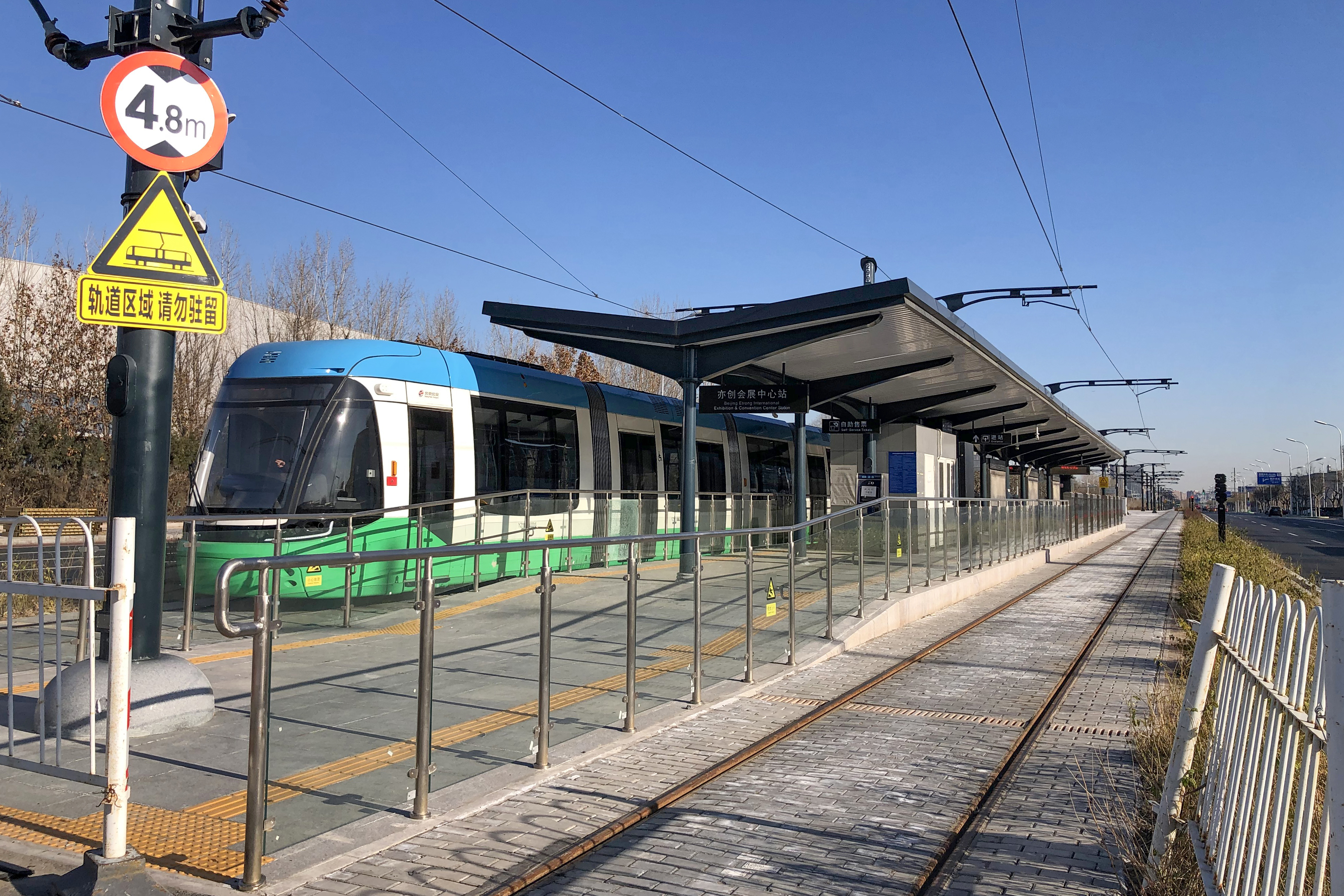
Beijing Etrong International Exhibition & Convention Center station platform

Stations of Yizhuang T1 Line
Station	Chinese name	Location	Transfers	Platform type	Grade	Opened
Laoguanli	老观里	Daxing		Island	At-grade	Not open
Quzhuang	屈庄	Daxing		Side	At-grade	31 December 2020
Rongxing Jie	融兴街	Daxing		Side	At-grade	31 December 2020
Rhihezhuang	瑞合庄	Daxing		Side	At-grade	31 December 2020
Taiheqiaobei	太和桥北	Daxing		Island	At-grade	31 December 2020
Sihaizhuang	四海庄	Daxing		Island	At-grade	31 December 2020
Jiuhaocun	九号村	Daxing		Island	At-grade	31 December 2020
Taihe Lu	泰河路	Daxing		Island	At-grade	31 December 2020
Lujuandong	鹿圈东	Daxing		Island	At-grade	31 December 2020
Yizhuang Tongren	亦庄同仁	Daxing		Island	At-grade	31 December 2020
Rongchang Dongjie	荣昌东街	Daxing	Yizhuang	Island	At-grade	31 December 2020
Beijing Etrong International Exhibition & Convention Center	亦创会展中心	Daxing		Island	At-grade	31 December 2020
Jinghai Yilu	经海一路	Tongzhou		Side	At-grade	31 December 2020
Dinghaiyuanxi	定海园西	Tongzhou		Side	At-grade	31 December 2020
Dinghaiyuan	定海园	Tongzhou		Side	At-grade	31 December 2020

== Capital Airport Express ==
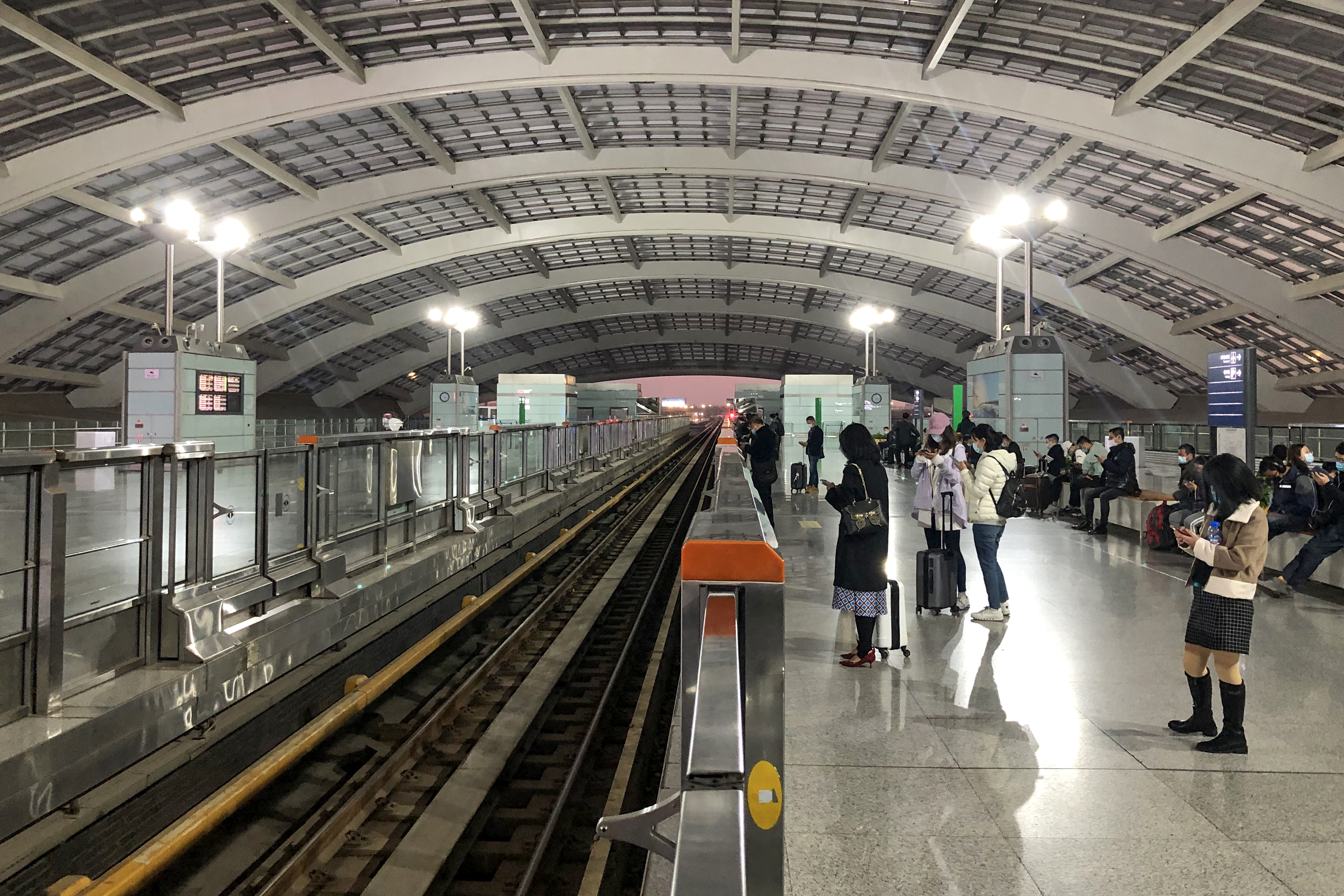
Terminal 3 station platform

Stations of Capital Airport Express
Station	Chinese name	Location	Transfers	Platform type	Grade	Opened
Beixinqiao	北新橋	Dongcheng	5	Side	Underground	31 December 2021
Dongzhimen	东直门	Dongcheng	2 13	Side	Underground	19 July 2008
Sanyuanqiao	三元桥	Chaoyang	10 12	Island	Underground	19 July 2008
Terminal 3	3号航站楼	Shunyi	PEK Terminal 3	Spanish solution	Elevated	19 July 2008
Terminal 2	2号航站楼	Chaoyang	PEK Terminals 1 & 2	Single-sided	Underground	19 July 2008

== Daxing Airport Express ==
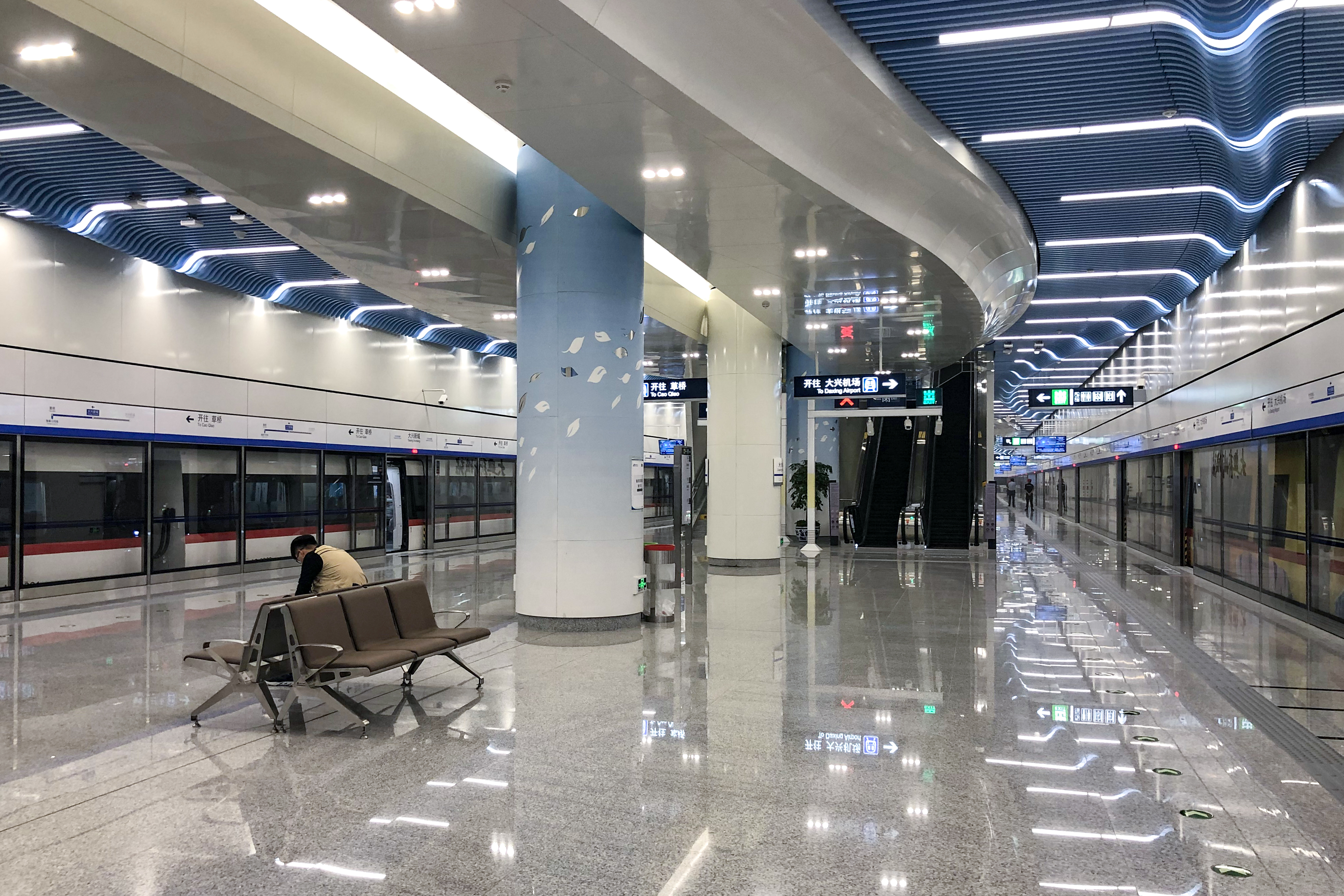
Daxing Xincheng station platform

Stations of Daxing Airport Express
Station	Chinese name	Location	Transfers	Platform type	Grade	Opened
Caoqiao	草桥	Fengtai	10 19	Side	Underground	26 September 2019
Daxing Xincheng	大兴新城	Daxing		Island	Underground	26 September 2019
Daxing Airport	大兴机场	Guangyang (Langfang, Hebei Province)	PKX; Daxing Airport	Side	Underground	26 September 2019
