= Lishui Qiao station =

Beijing Subway interchange station

Lishui Qiao 立水桥
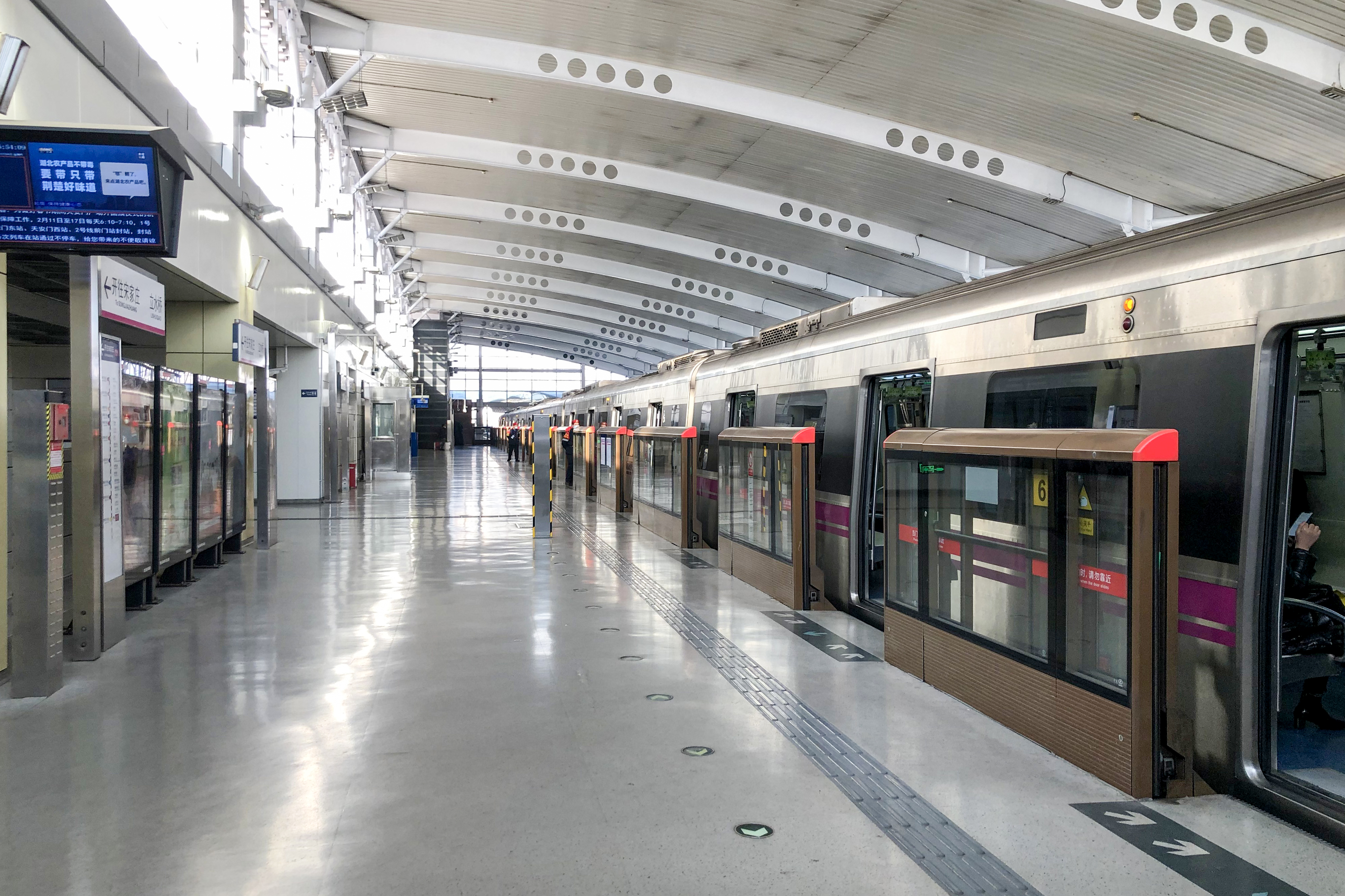
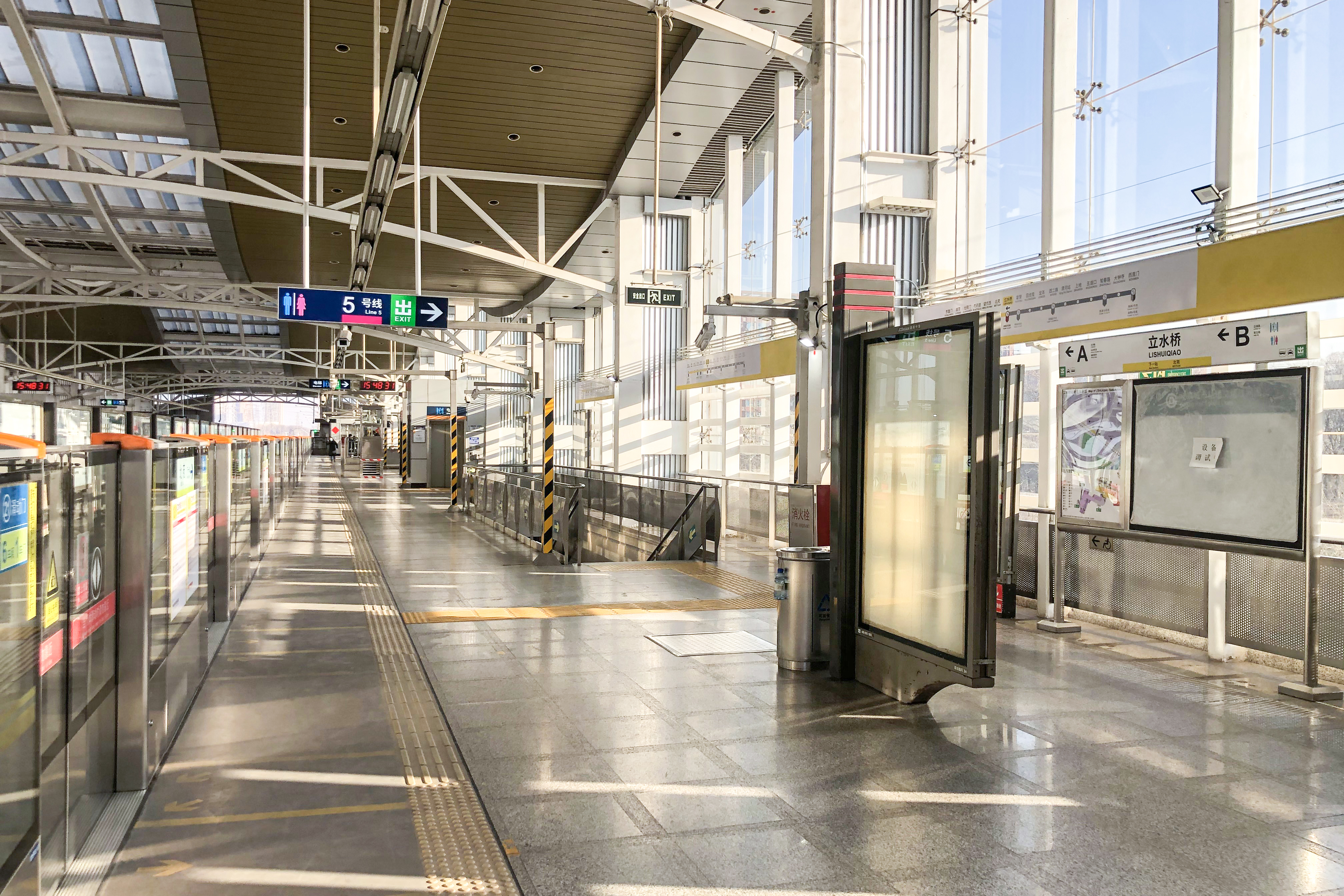
- Line 5 platform Line 13 platform

General information
- Location: Litang Road (立汤路) north of Lishui Bridge; Chaoyang District, Beijing; China
- Coordinates: 40°03′11″N 116°24′44″E
- Operator: Beijing Mass Transit Railway Operation Corporation Limited
- Lines: Line 5; Line 13
- Platforms: 4 (4 side platforms)
- Tracks: 4

Construction
- Structure type: At-grade (Line 5); Elevated (Line 13)
- Accessible: Yes

Other information
- Station code: 1310 (line 13)

History
- Opened: October 7, 2007; 18 years ago (Line 5); January 28, 2003; 23 years ago (Line 13)

Services
Preceding station	Beijing Subway	Following station
Tiantongyuannan towards Tiantongyuanbei	Line 5	Lishuiqiaonan towards Songjiazhuang
Huoying towards Xizhimen	Line 13	Bei Yuan towards Dongzhimen
Location
- Location within Beijing

Lishui Qiao Station (simplified Chinese: 立水桥站; traditional Chinese: 立水橋站; pinyin: Lìshuǐ Qiáo Zhàn) is a station on Line 5 and Line 13 of the Beijing Subway.

== Station layout ==
The line 5 station uses 2 ground-level side platforms, and the line 13 station uses 2 elevated side platforms.

== Exits ==
There are 3 exits, lettered A, B1, and B2. Exits A and B1 are accessible.

== Gallery ==
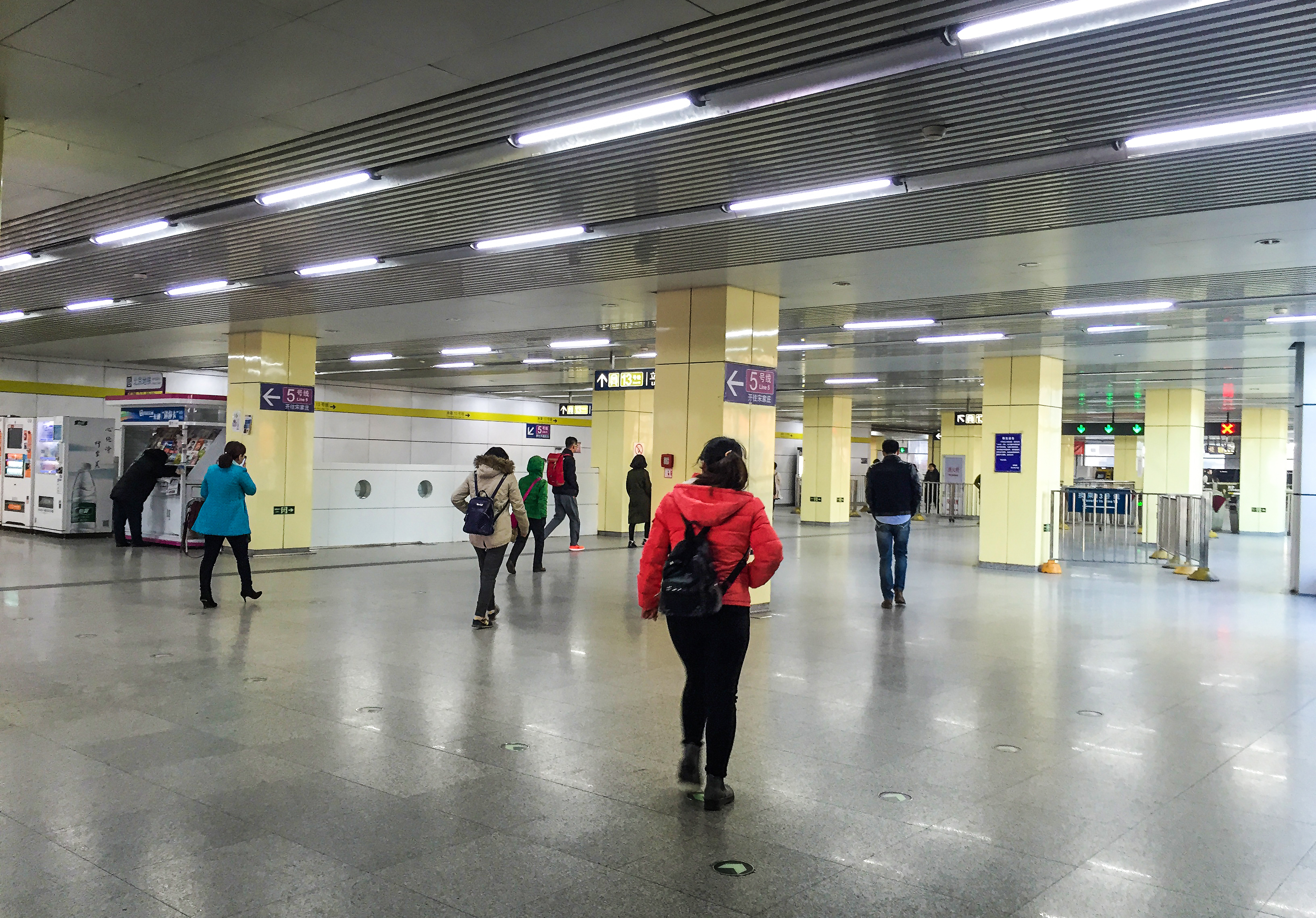
Line 5 concourse (March 2017)

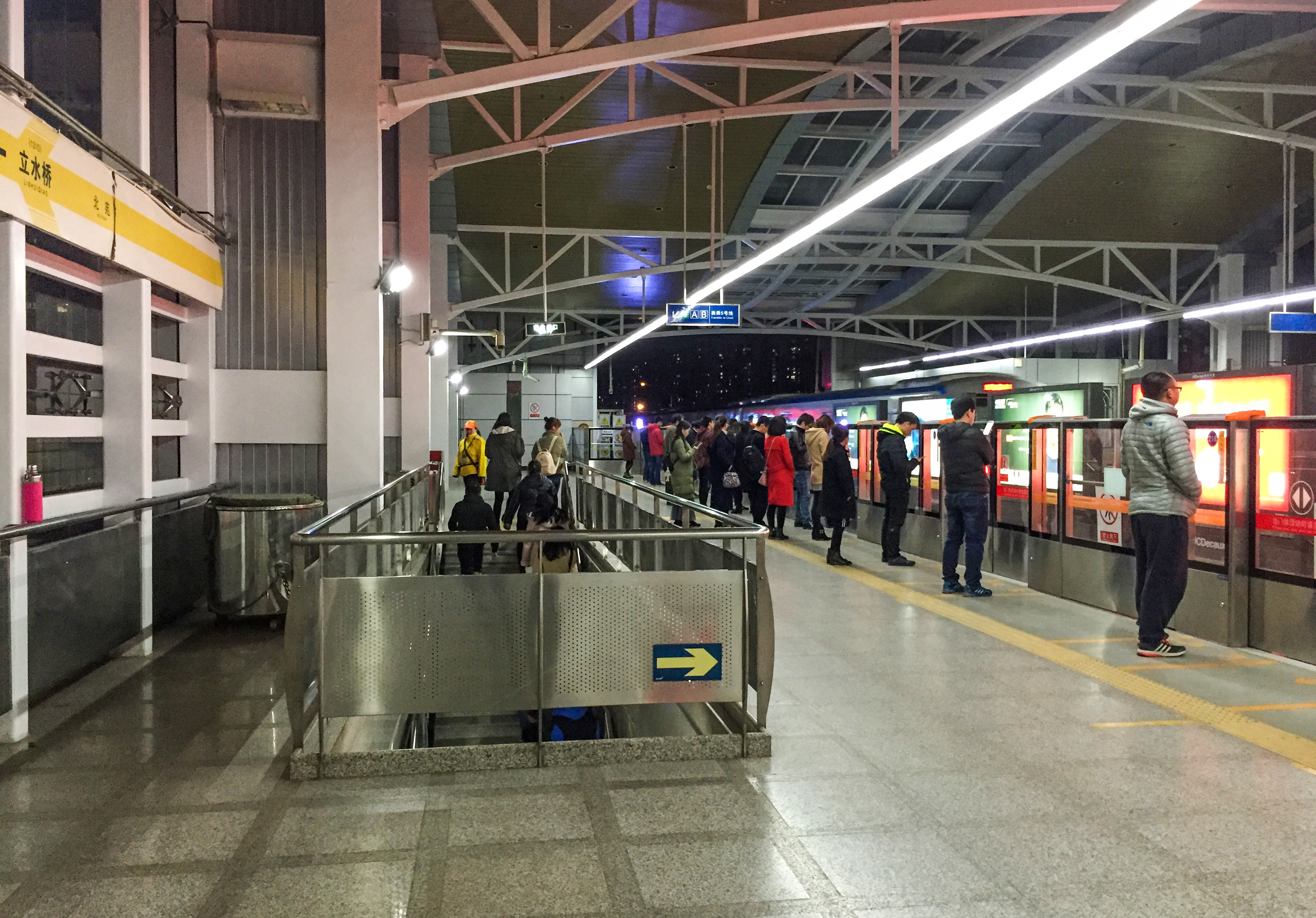
Line 13 platform (March 2017)

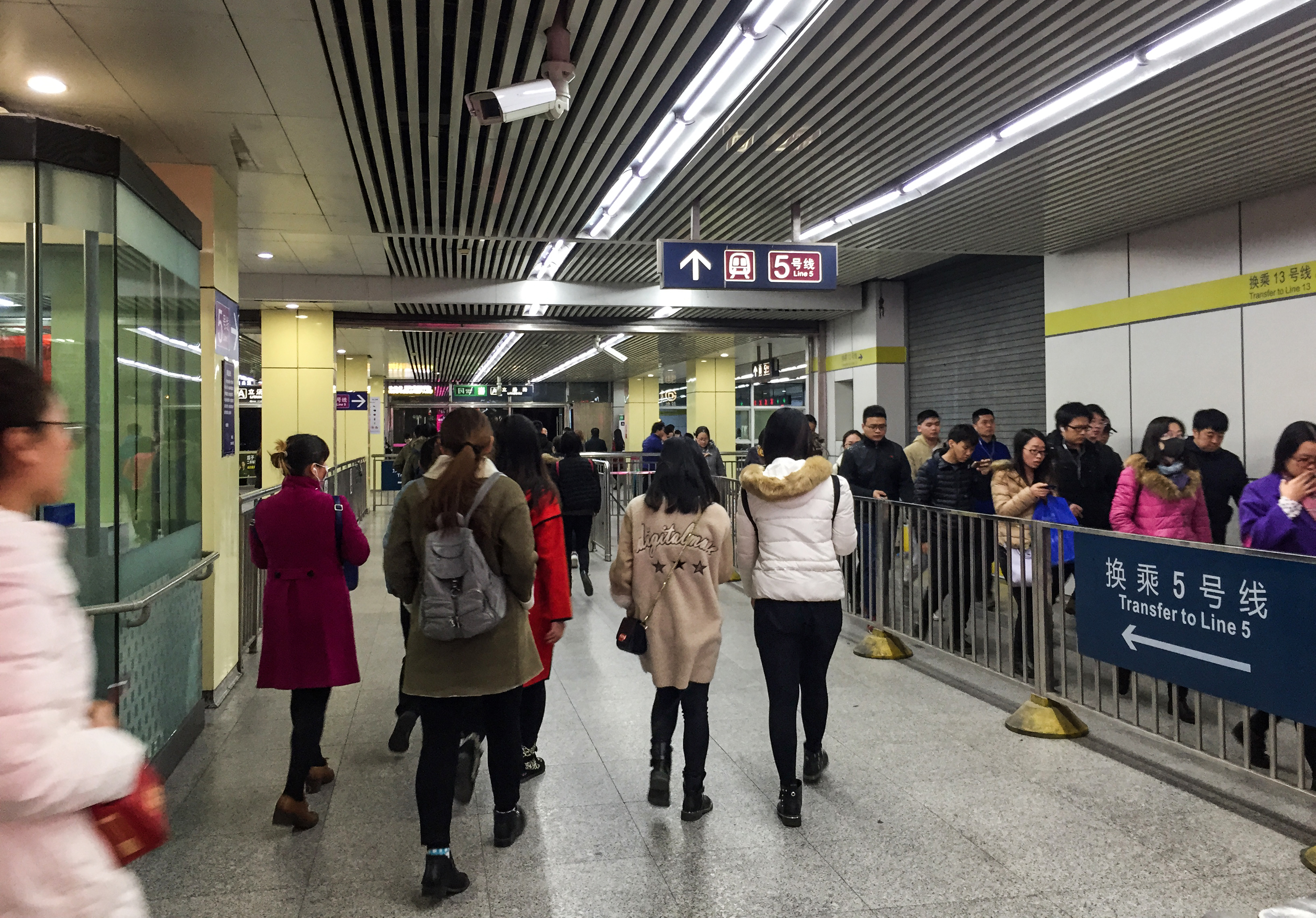
Interchange corridor

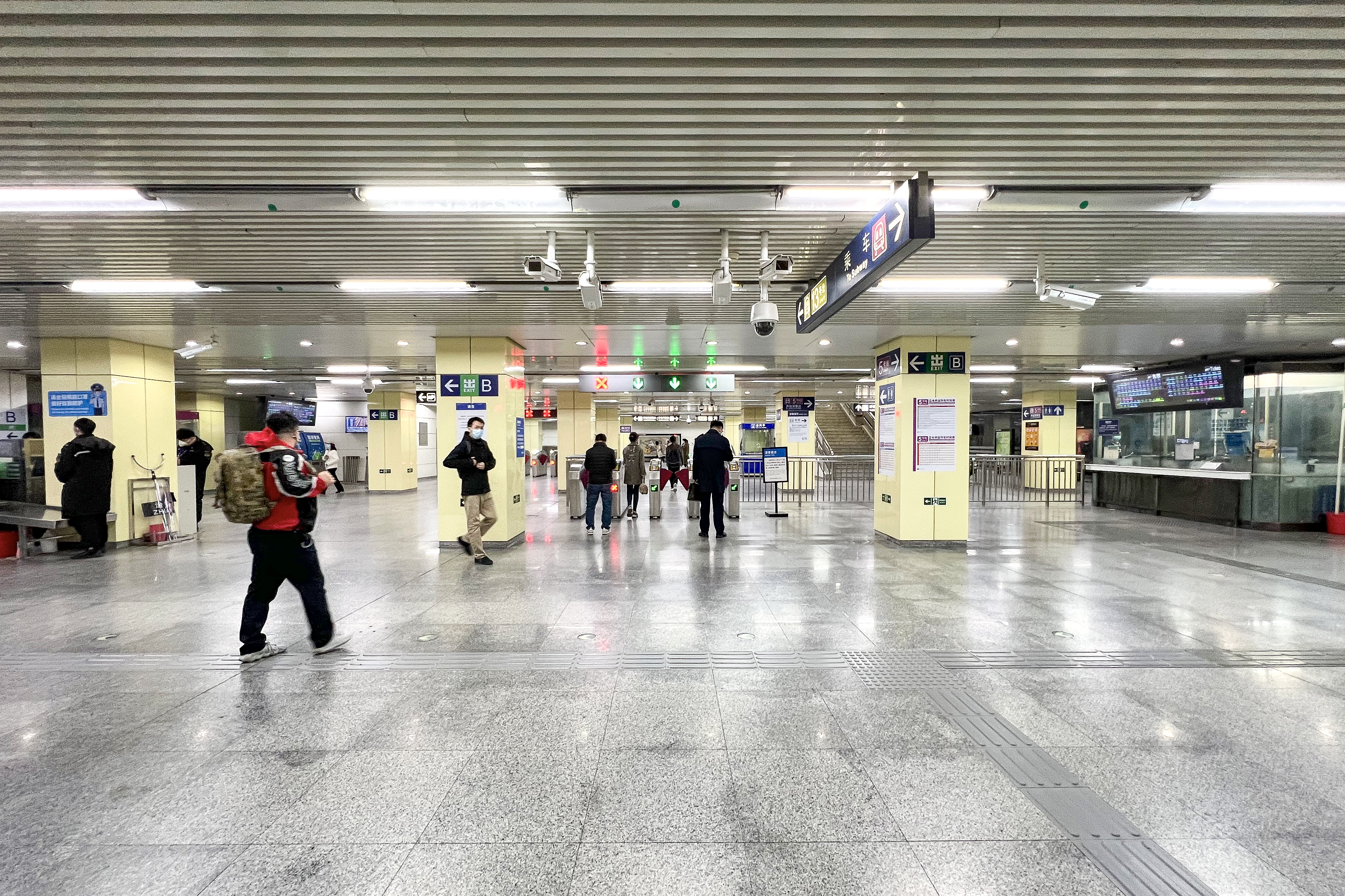
Line 5 concourse (March 2023)

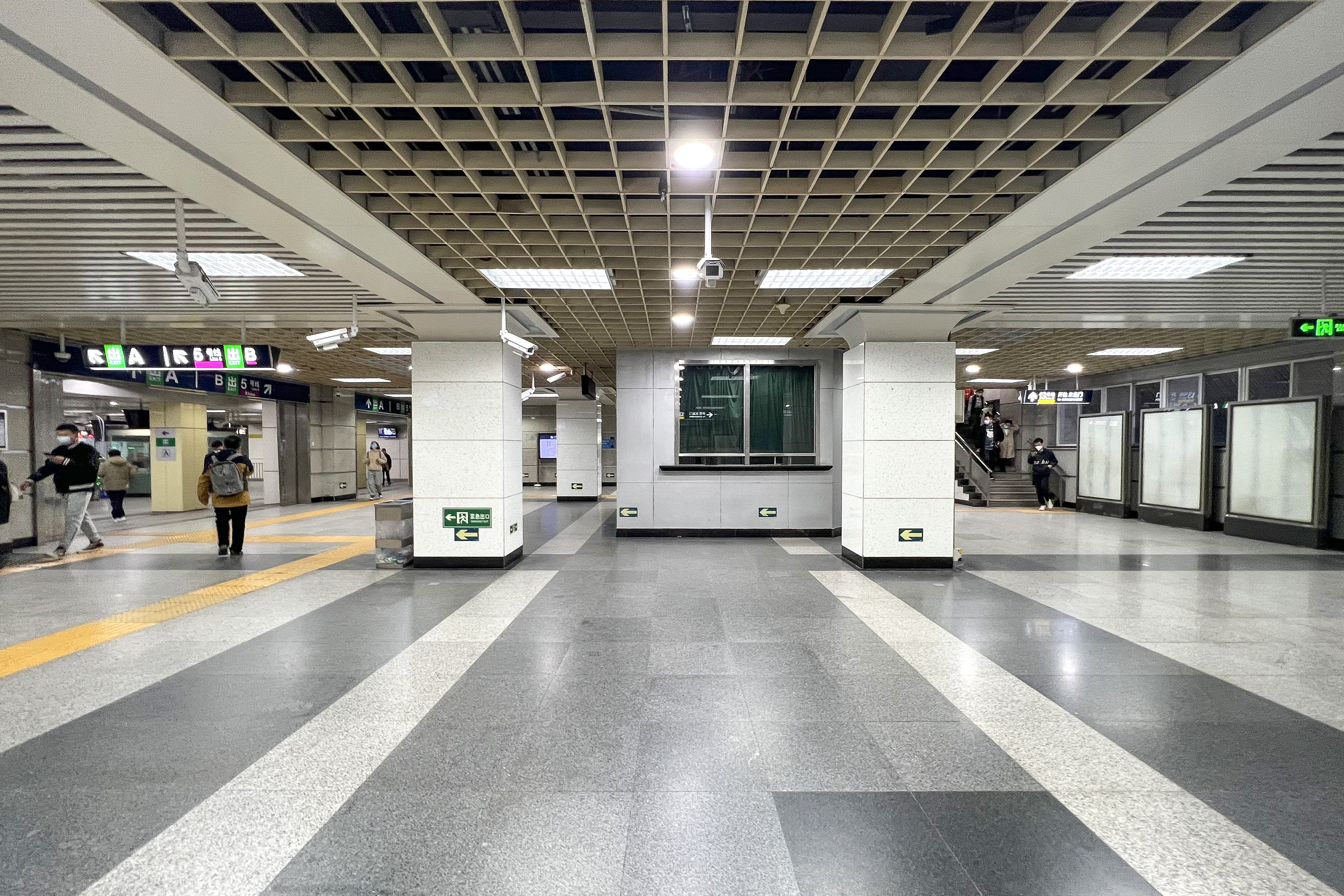
Line 13 concourse (March 2023)

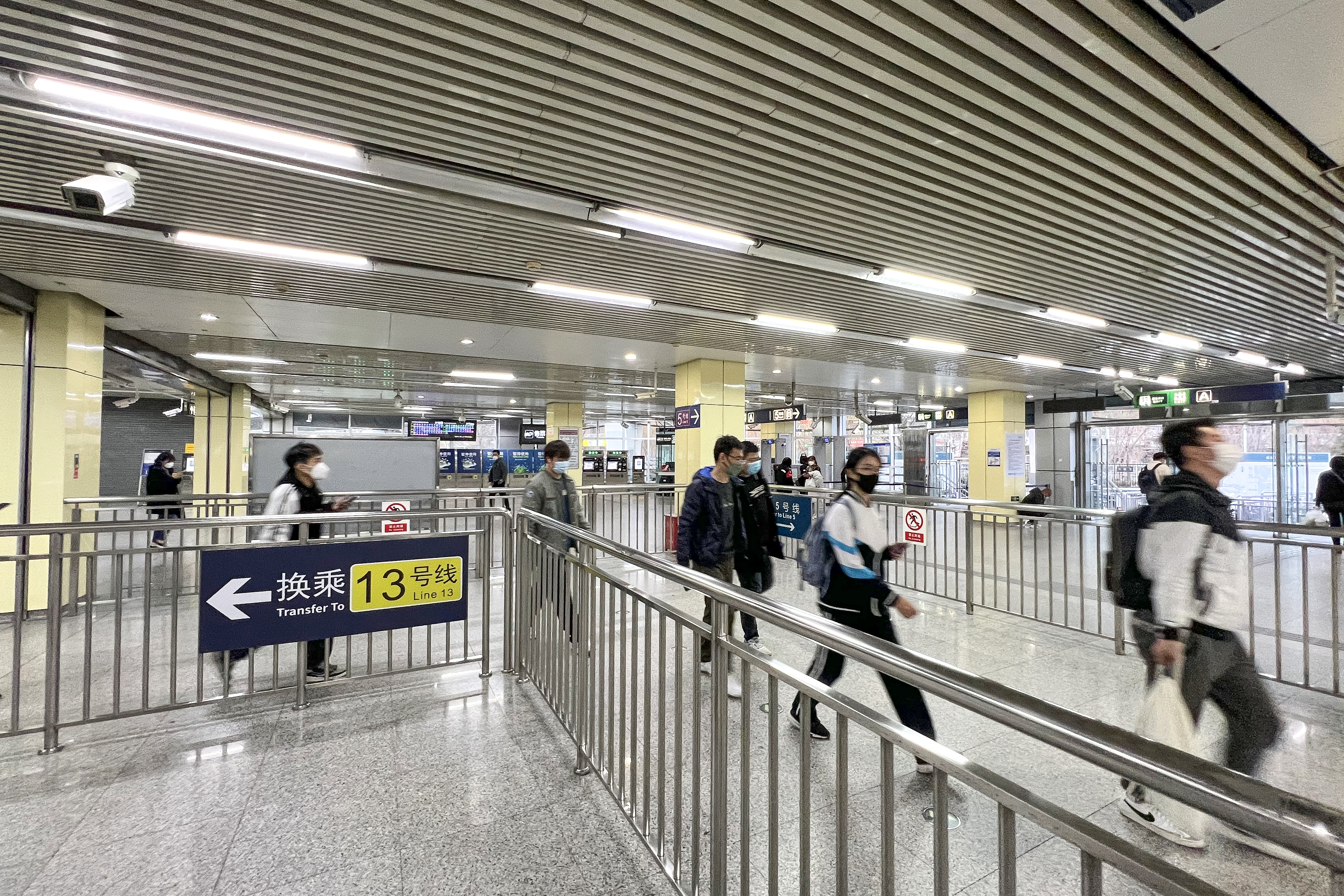
Central concourse

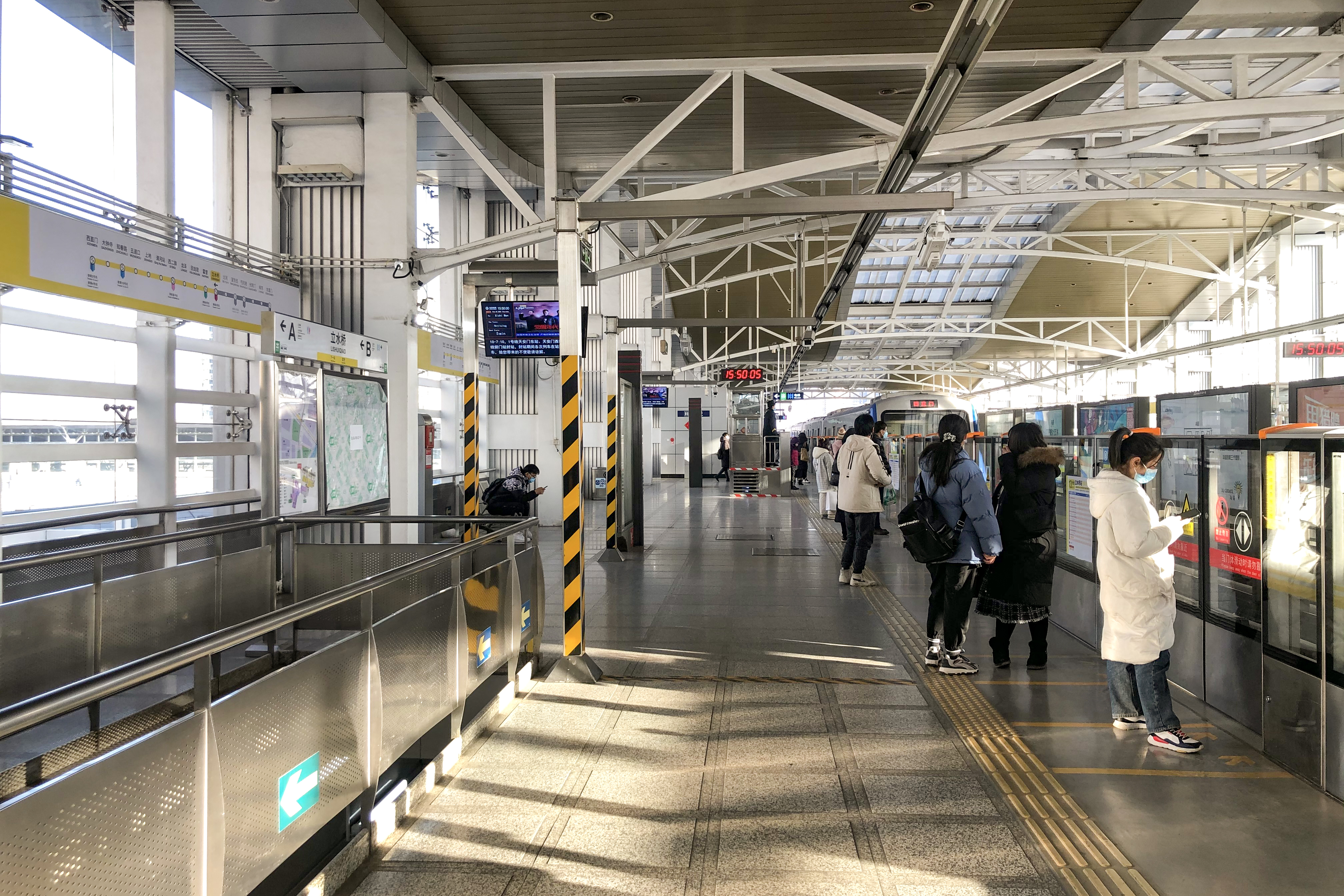
Line 13 westbound platform (February 2021)
