= Yonghegong Lama Temple station =

Beijing Subway interchange station

Yonghegong Lama Temple 雍和宫
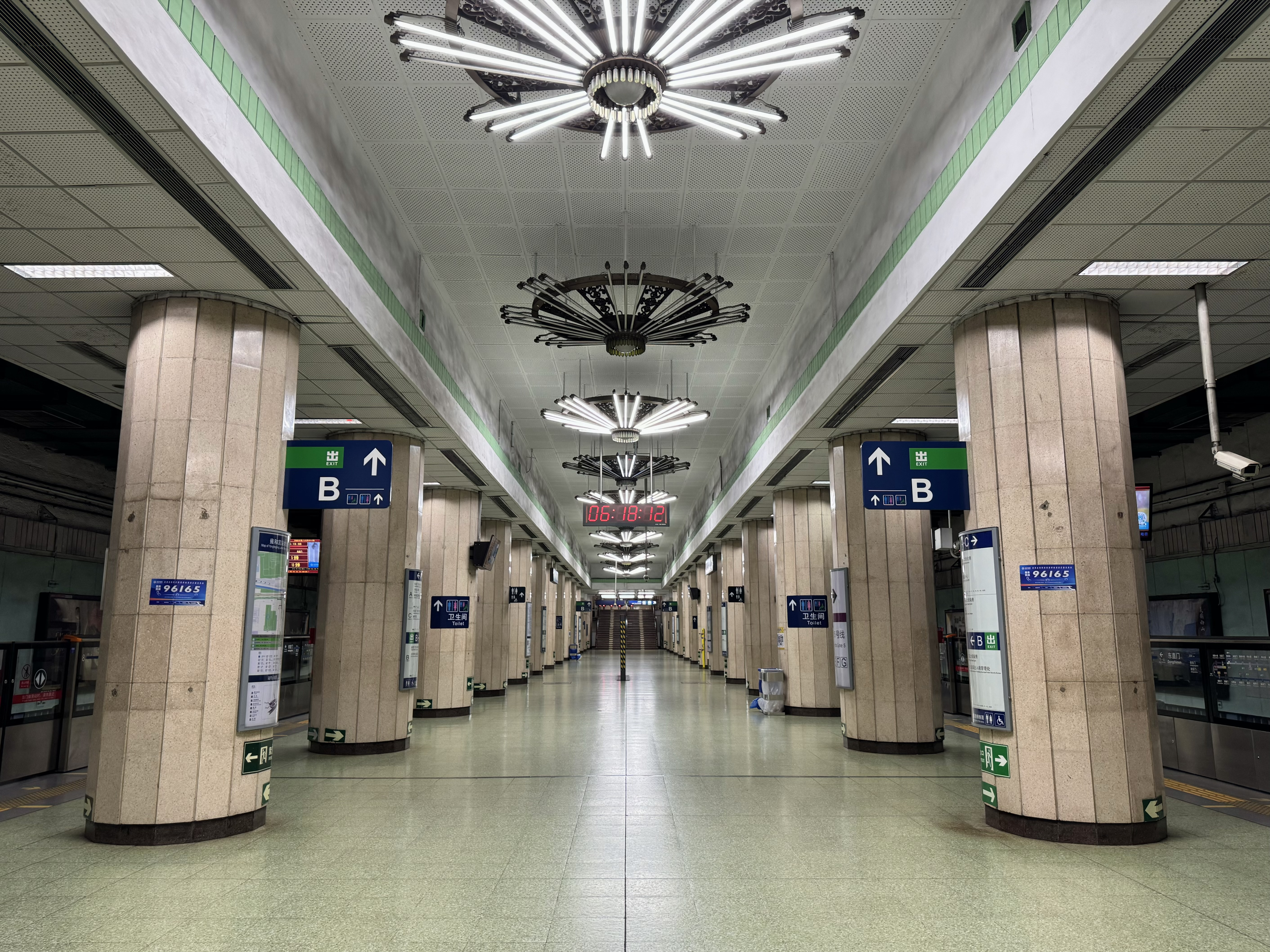
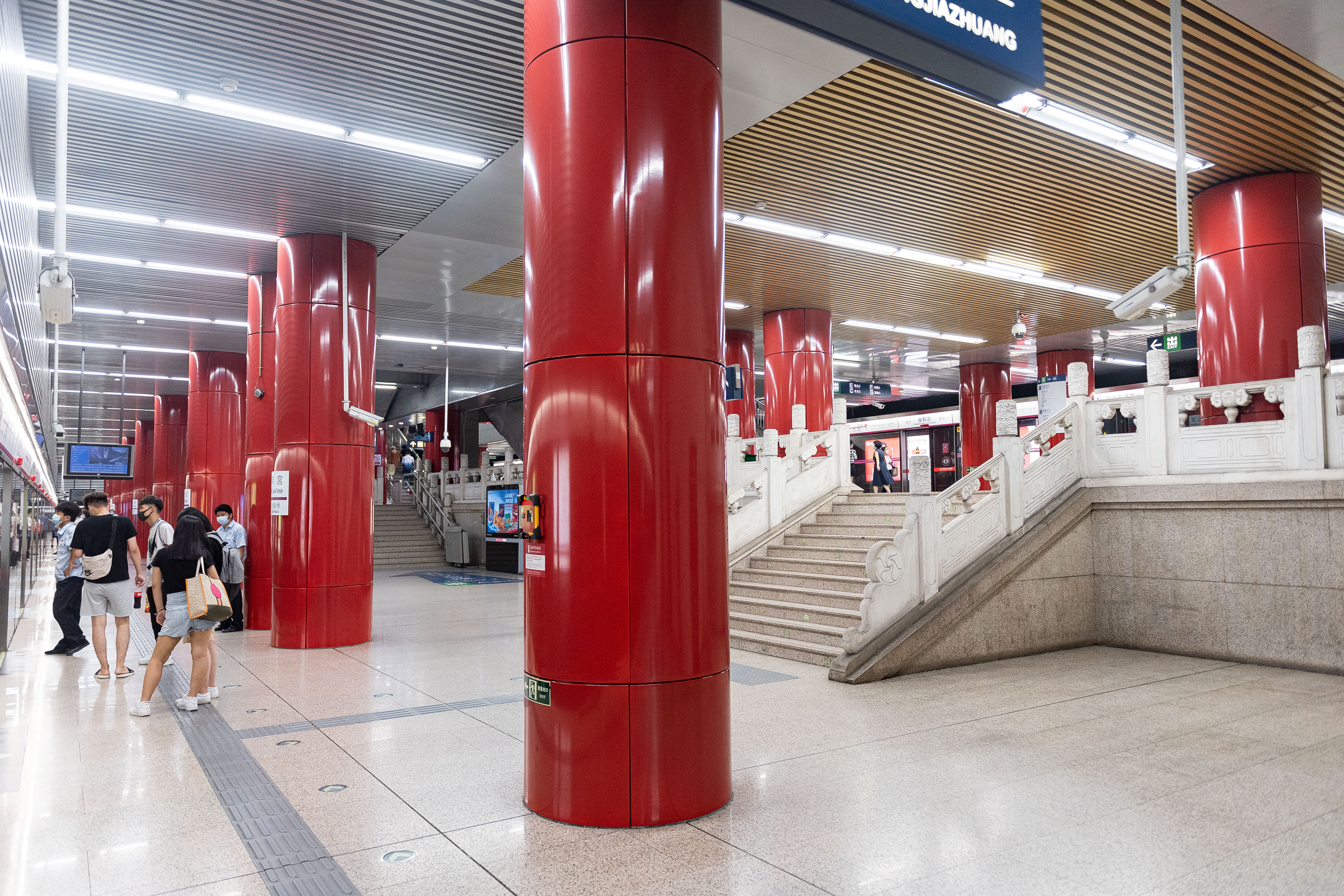
- Line 2 platform Line 5 southbound platform on the lower level

General information
- Location: North 2nd Ring Road and Hepingli West Street (和平里西街) / Yonghegong Street (雍和宫大街); Dongcheng District, Beijing; China
- Coordinates: 39.9493°N 116.4171°E
- Operator: Beijing Mass Transit Railway Operation Corporation Limited
- Lines: Line 2; Line 5
- Platforms: 4 (2 island platforms)
- Tracks: 4

Construction
- Structure type: Underground
- Accessible: Yes

Other information
- Station code: 215 (line 2)

History
- Opened: September 20, 1984; 41 years ago (line 2); October 7, 2007; 18 years ago (line 5)

Services
Preceding station	Beijing Subway	Following station
Anding Men outer loop / anticlockwise	Line 2	Dongzhimen inner loop / clockwise
Hepingli Beijie towards Tiantongyuanbei	Line 5	Beixinqiao towards Songjiazhuang
Location
- Location within Beijing

Yonghegong Lama Temple station (Chinese: 雍和宫站; pinyin: Yōnghégōng zhàn) is an interchange station on Line 2 and Line 5 of the Beijing Subway.

== Station layout ==
Both the Line 2 and 5 stations have underground island platforms.

== Exits ==
There are 6 exits, lettered A, B, C, E, F, and G. Exits C, E, and F are accessible.

== Gallery ==
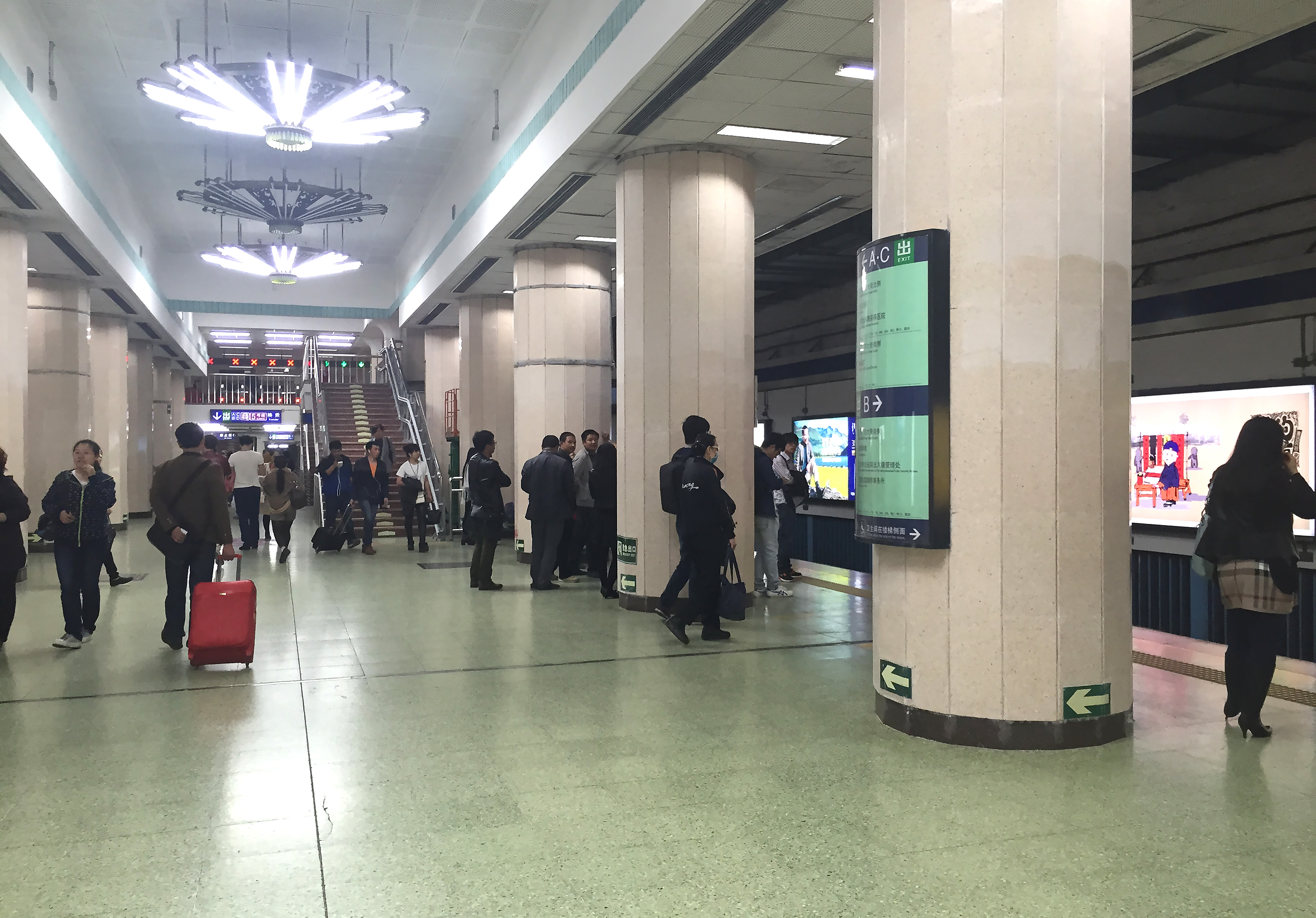
Line 2 platform before the platform screen door was installed

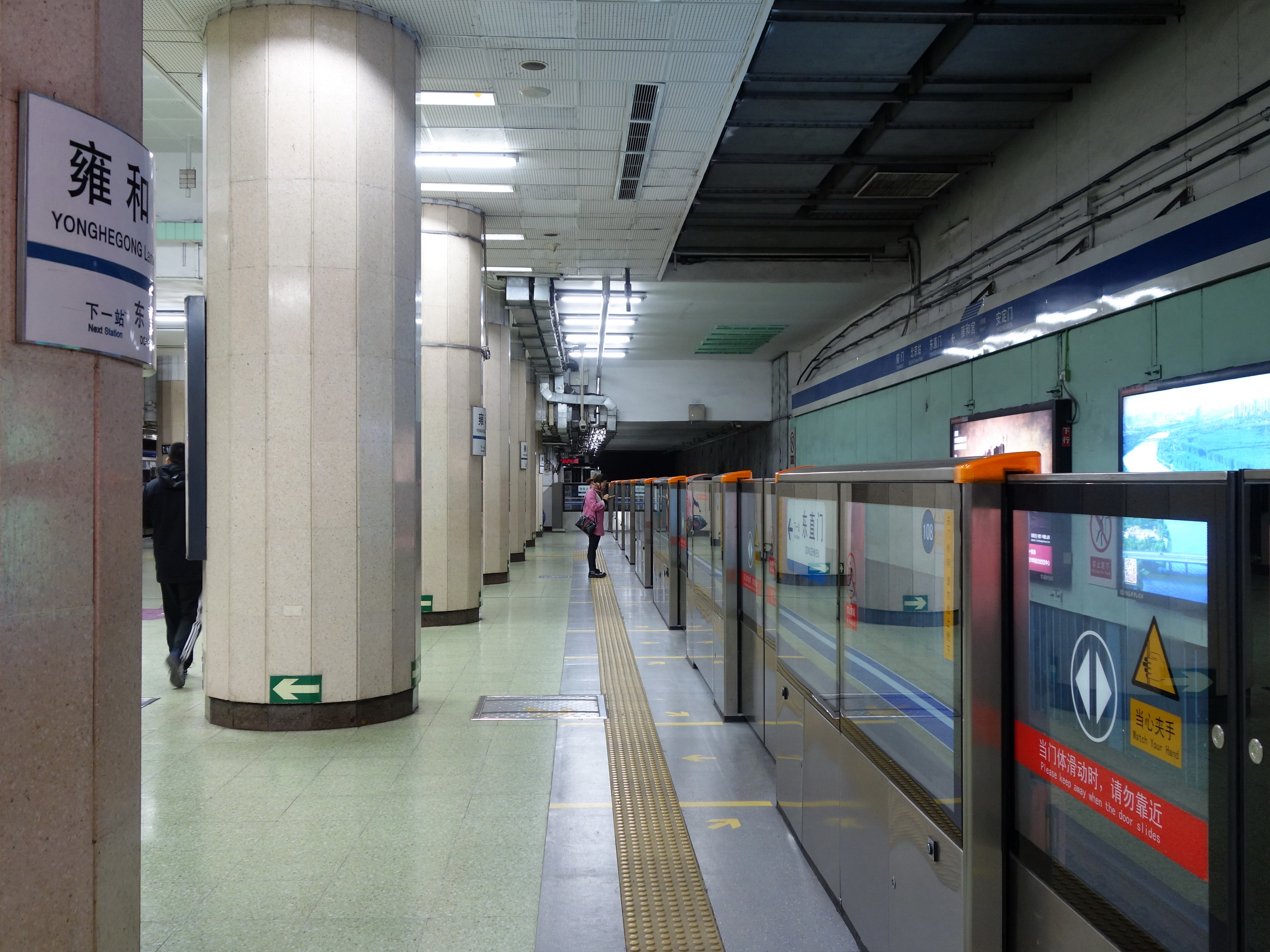
In 2017, platform screen doors were installed on the platform.

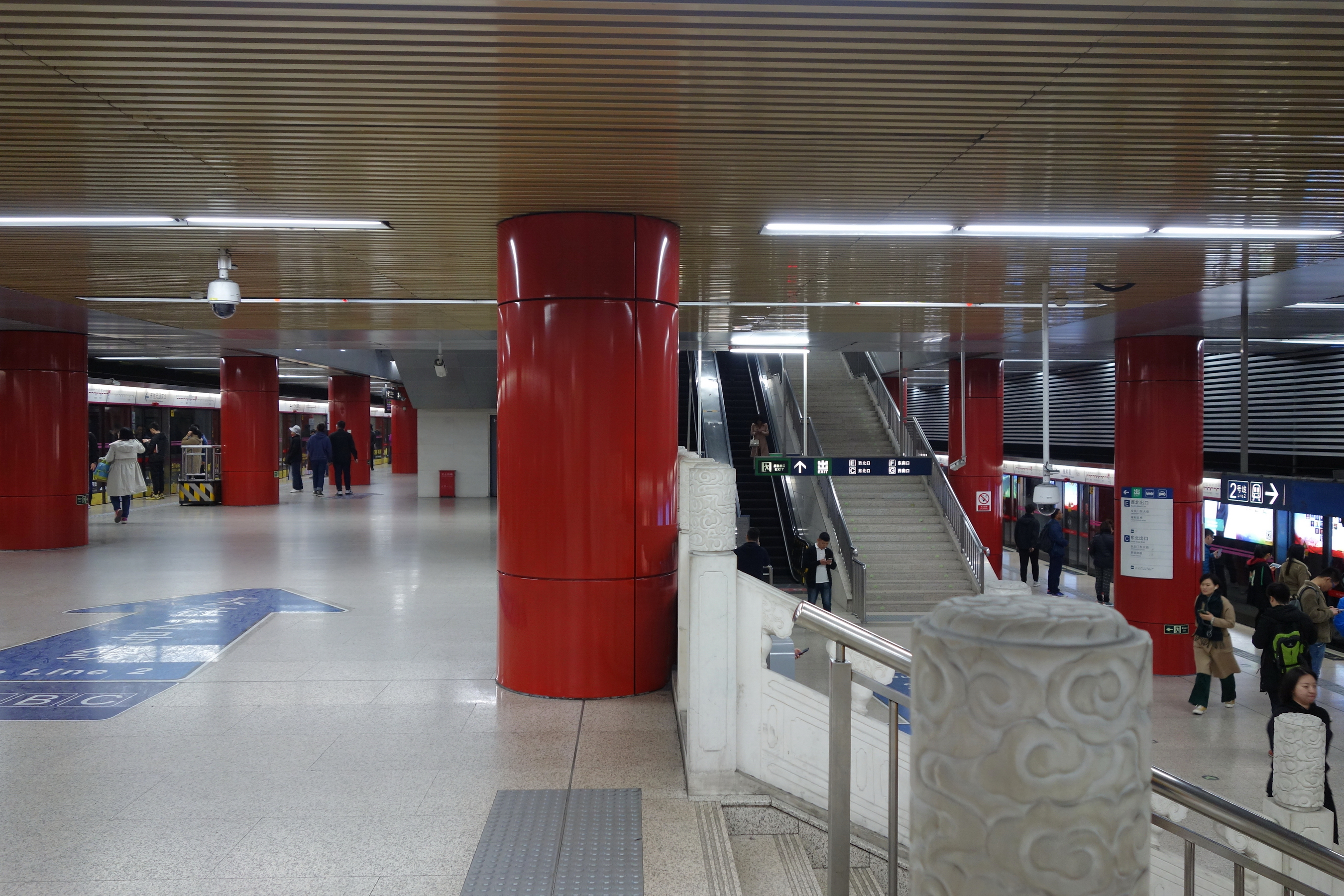
Line 5 platform

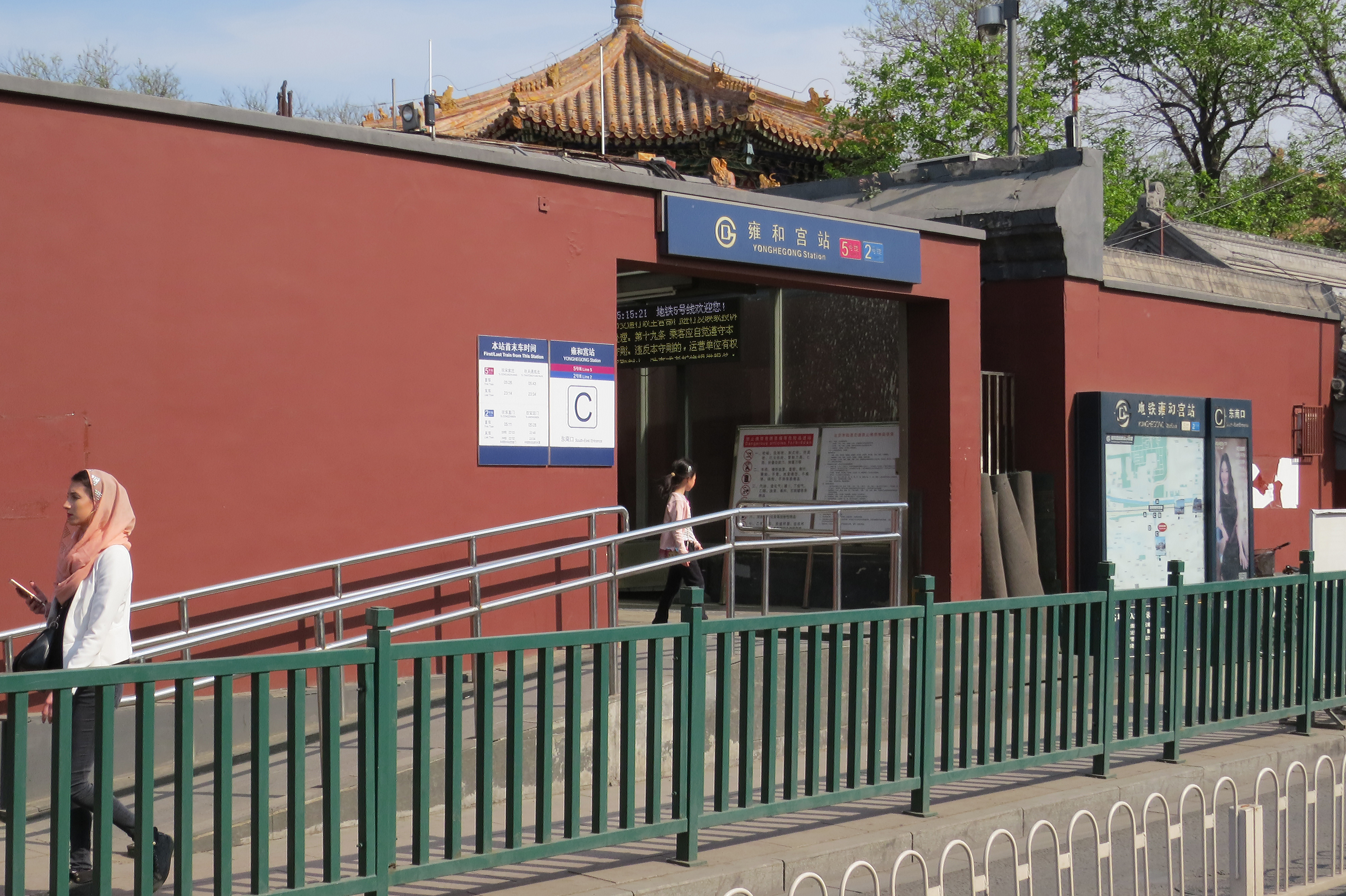
Exit C of Yonghegong Station

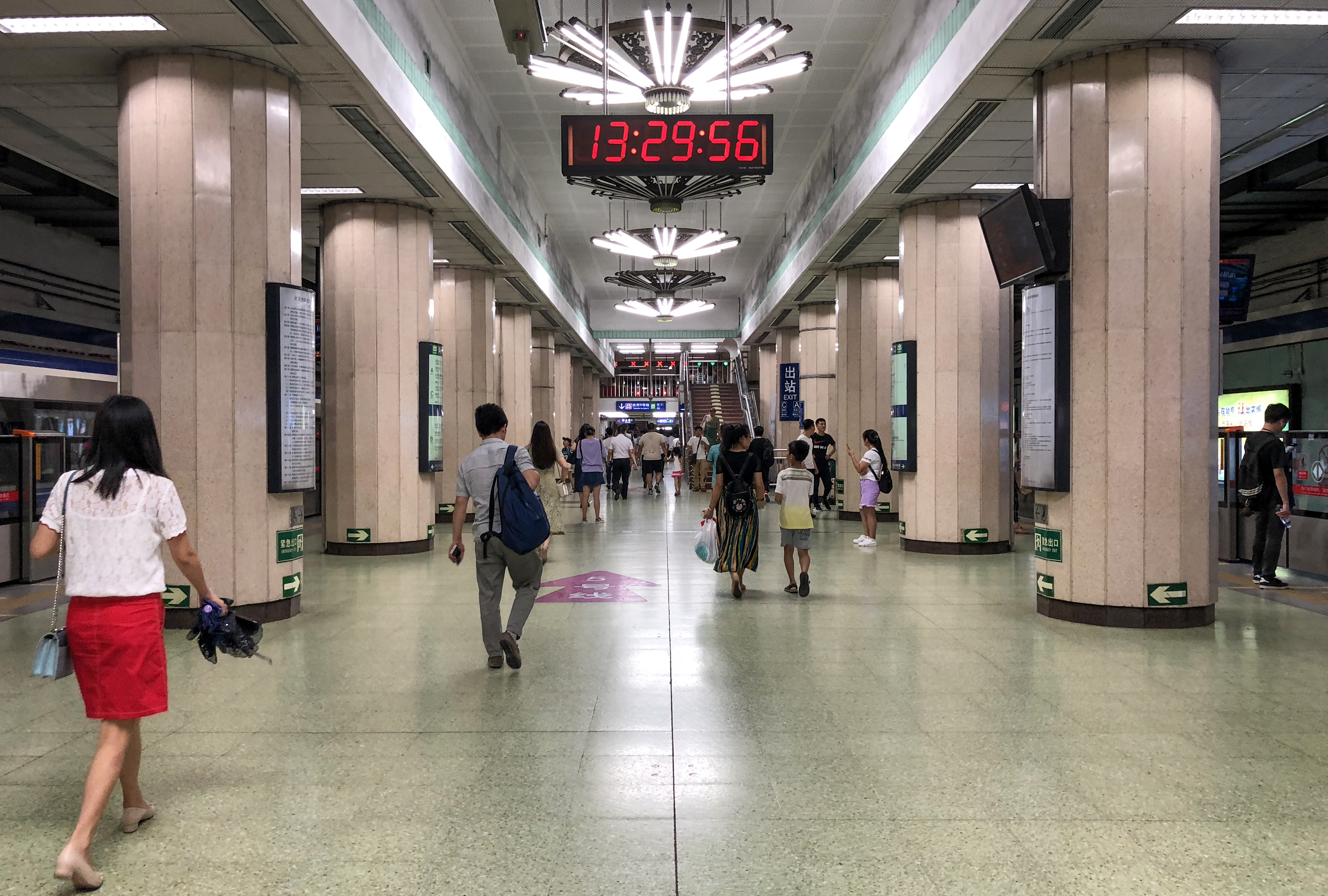
Line 2 platform (August 2018)

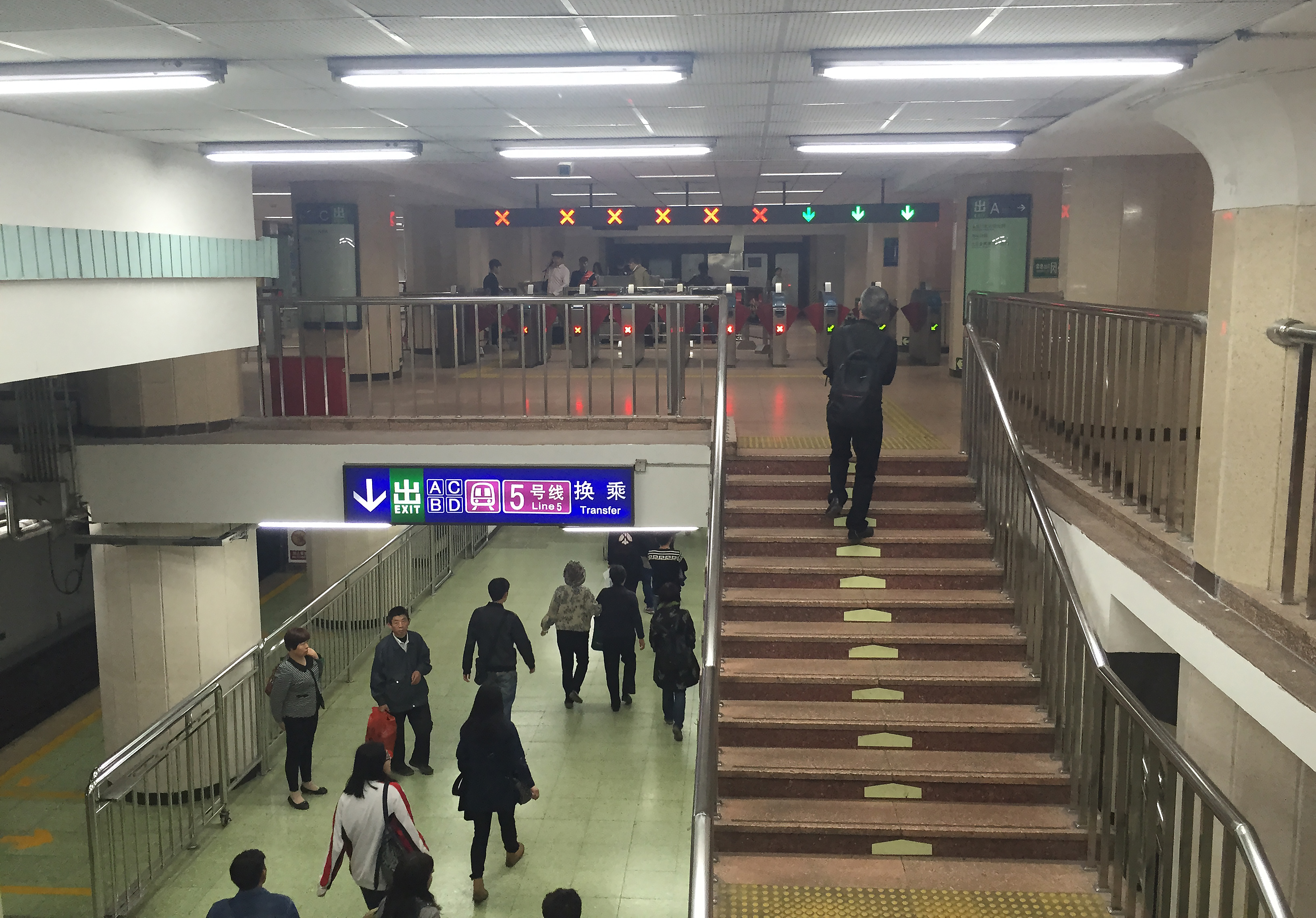
Line 2 concourse (April 2016)

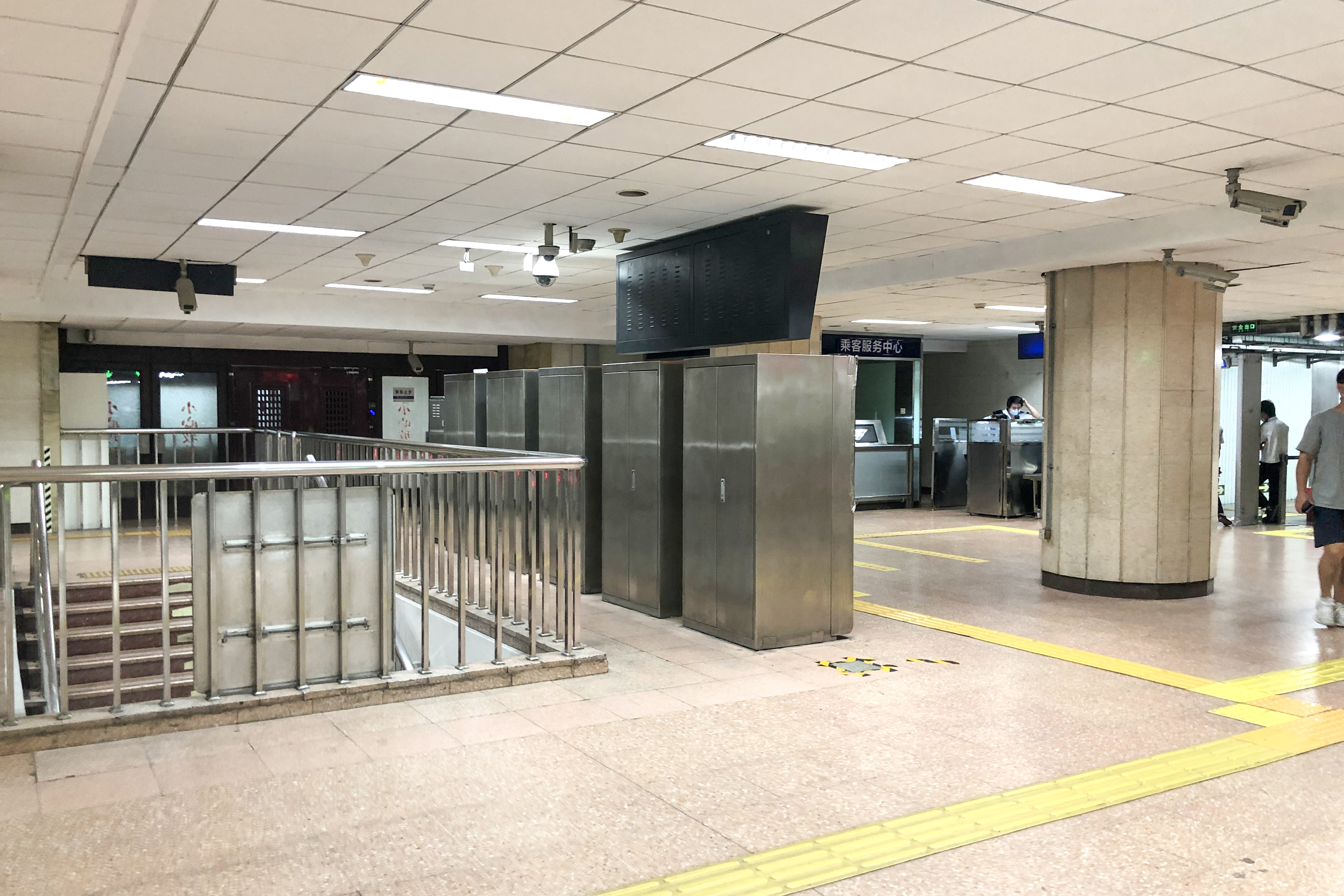
Line 2 west concourse (July 2021)

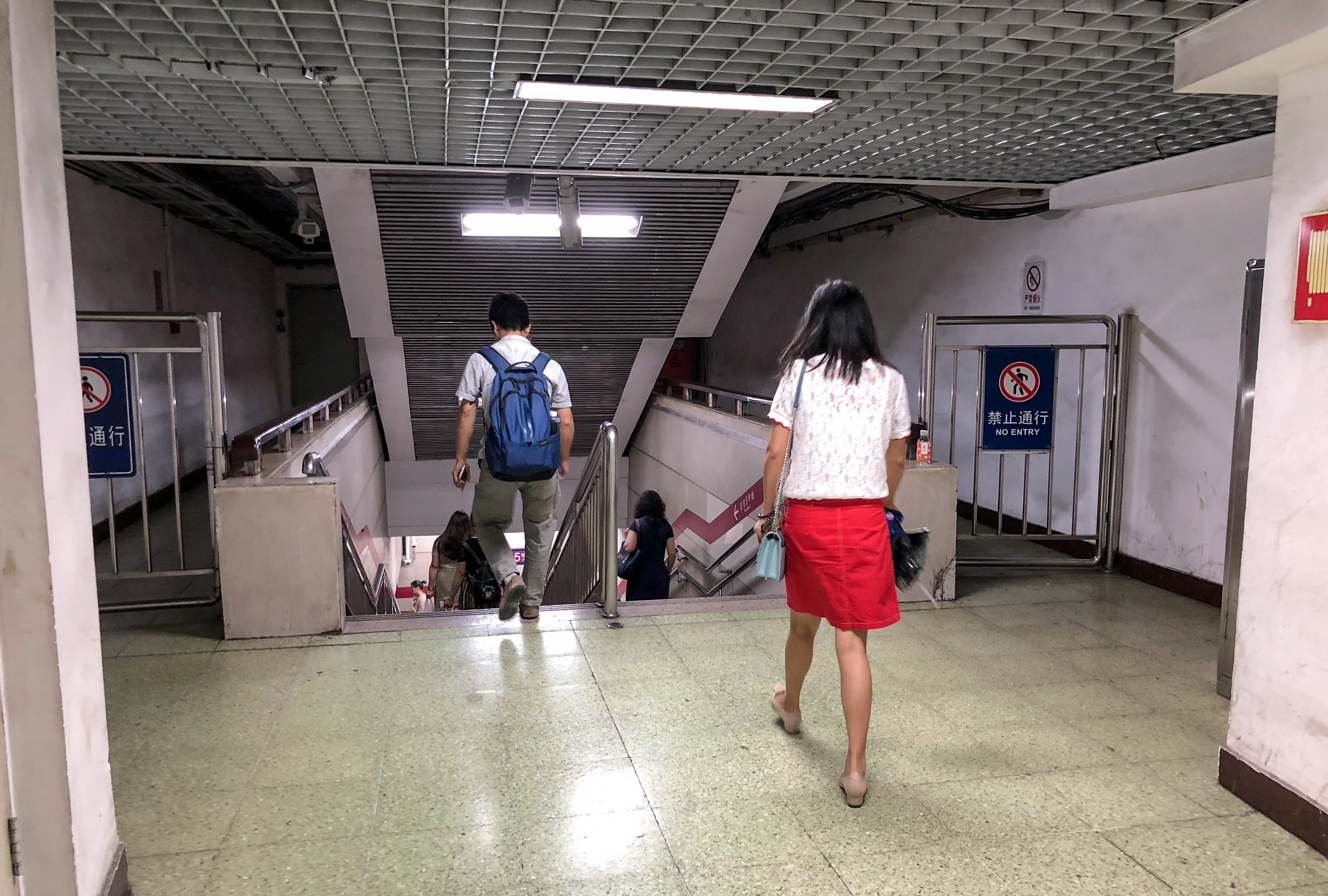
Interchange stairs

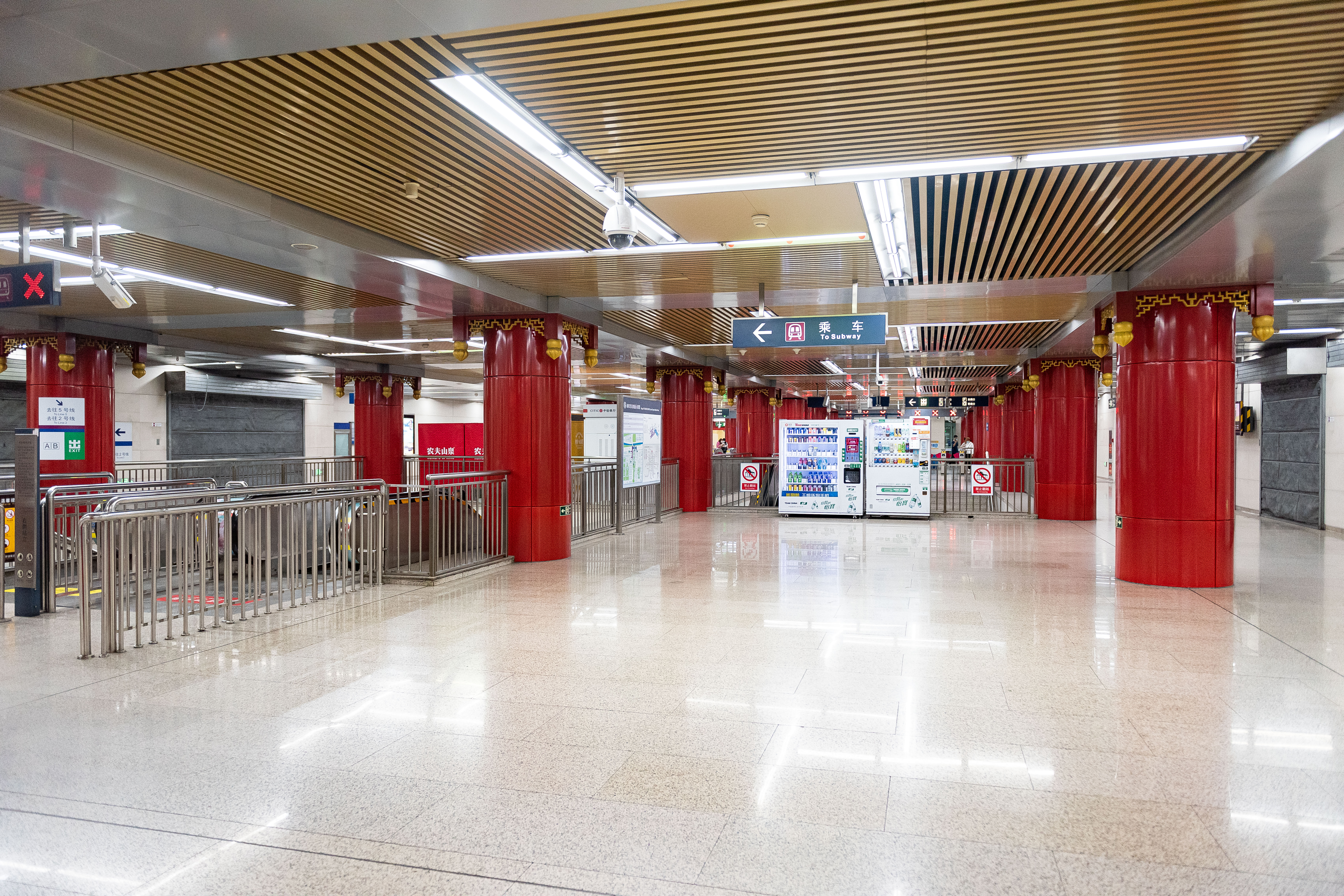
Line 5 concourse

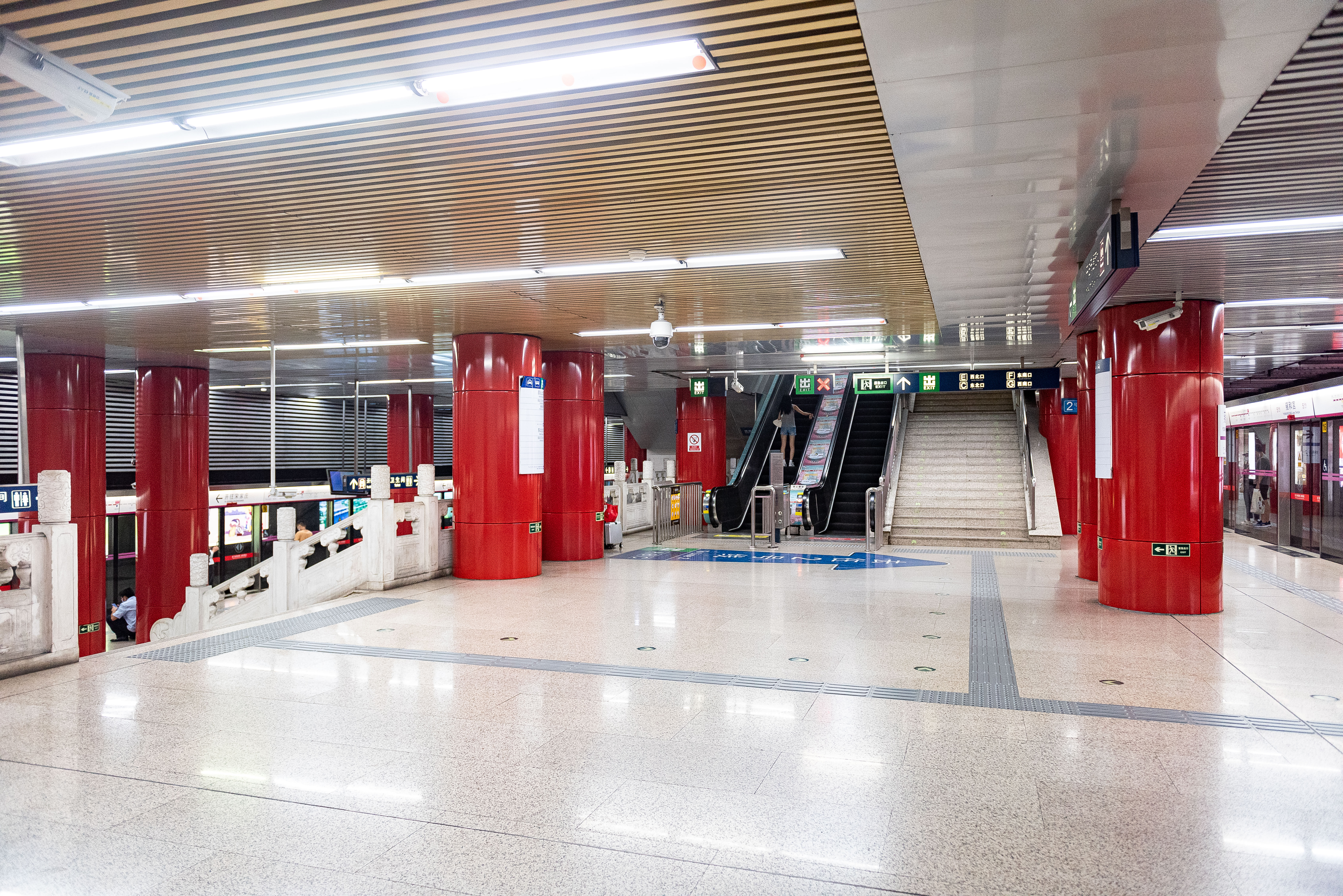
Line 5 northbound platform on the upper level

== See also ==
- Yonghe Temple (also called Lama Temple)
