= Tiantongyuannan station =

Beijing Subway station

Tiantongyuannan 天通苑南
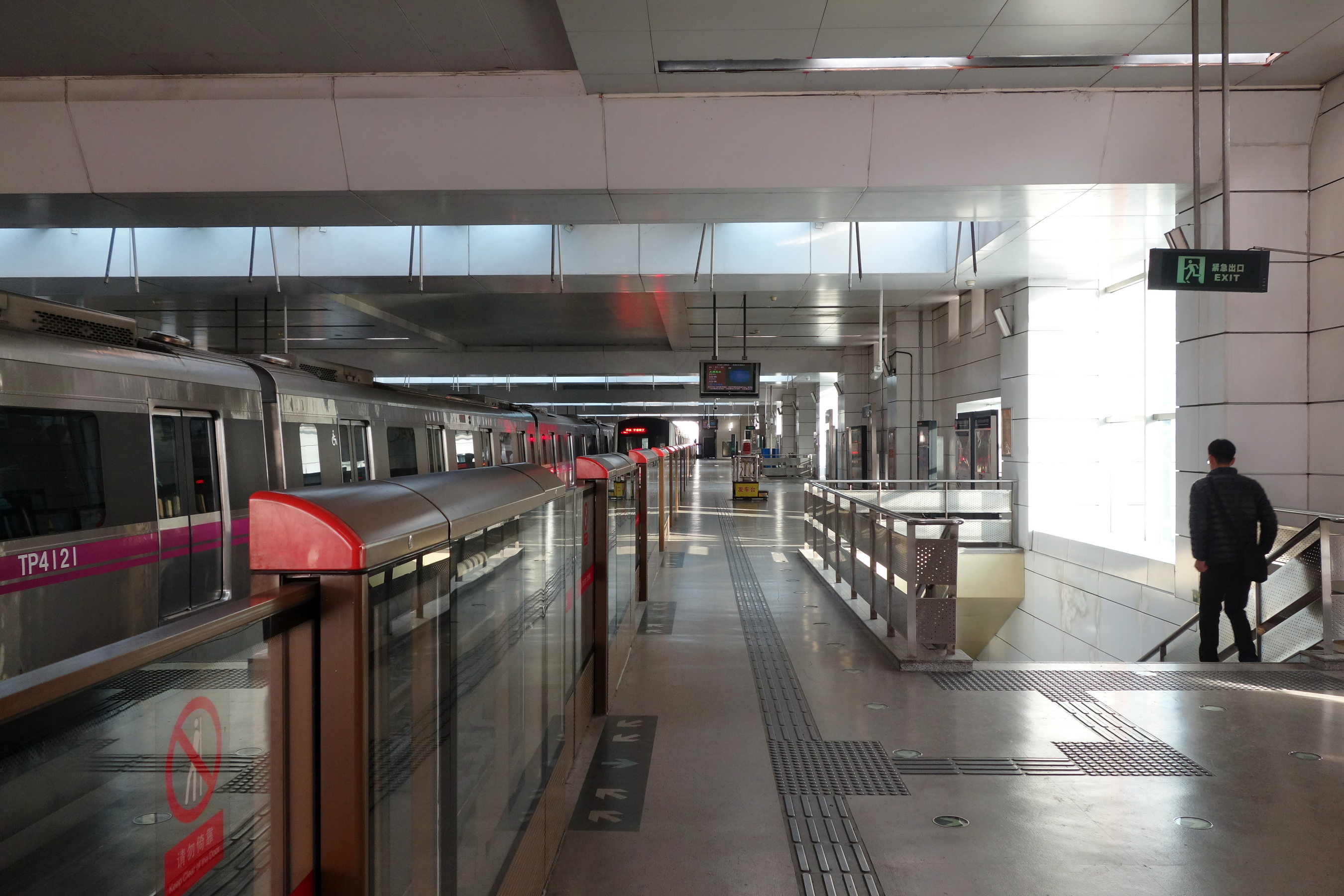
- Platform

General information
- Location: Litang Road (立汤路); Changping District, Beijing; China
- Coordinates: 40°03′59″N 116°24′46″E
- Operator: Beijing Mass Transit Railway Operation Corporation Limited
- Line: Line 5
- Platforms: 2 (2 side platforms)
- Tracks: 2

Construction
- Structure type: Elevated
- Accessible: Yes

History
- Opened: October 7, 2007; 18 years ago

Services
Preceding station	Beijing Subway	Following station
Tiantongyuan towards Tiantongyuanbei	Line 5	Lishui Qiao towards Songjiazhuang
Location
- Location within Beijing

Tiantongyuannan Station (Chinese: 天通苑南站; pinyin: Tiāntōngyuàn Nán Zhàn) is a station on Line 5 of the Beijing Subway.

== Station layout ==
The station has 2 elevated side platforms.

== Exits ==
There is 1 exit, A, which is accessible.
