= Puhuangyu station =

Beijing Subway interchange station

Coordinates: 39°51′56″N 116°25′19″E

Puhuangyu 蒲黄榆
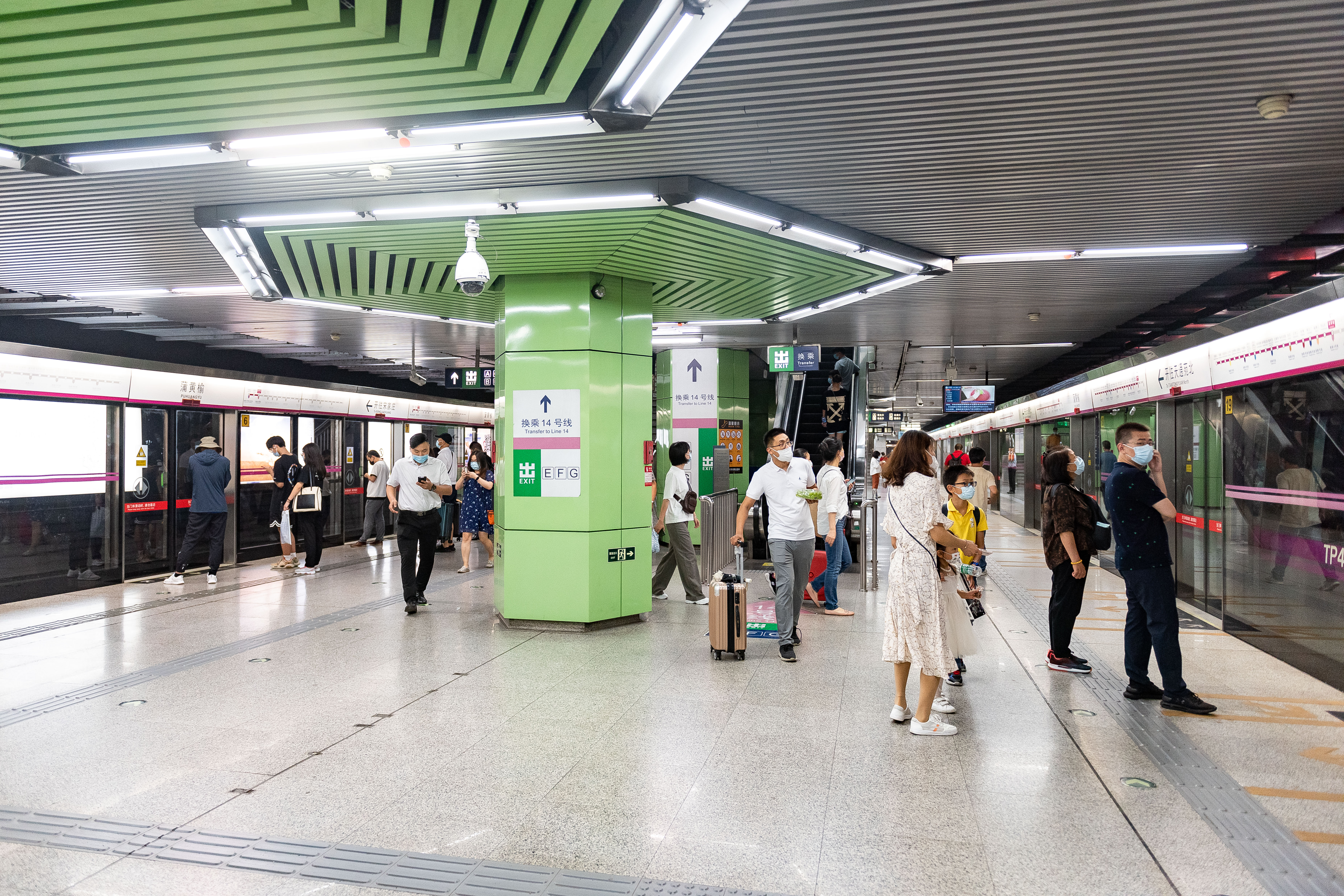
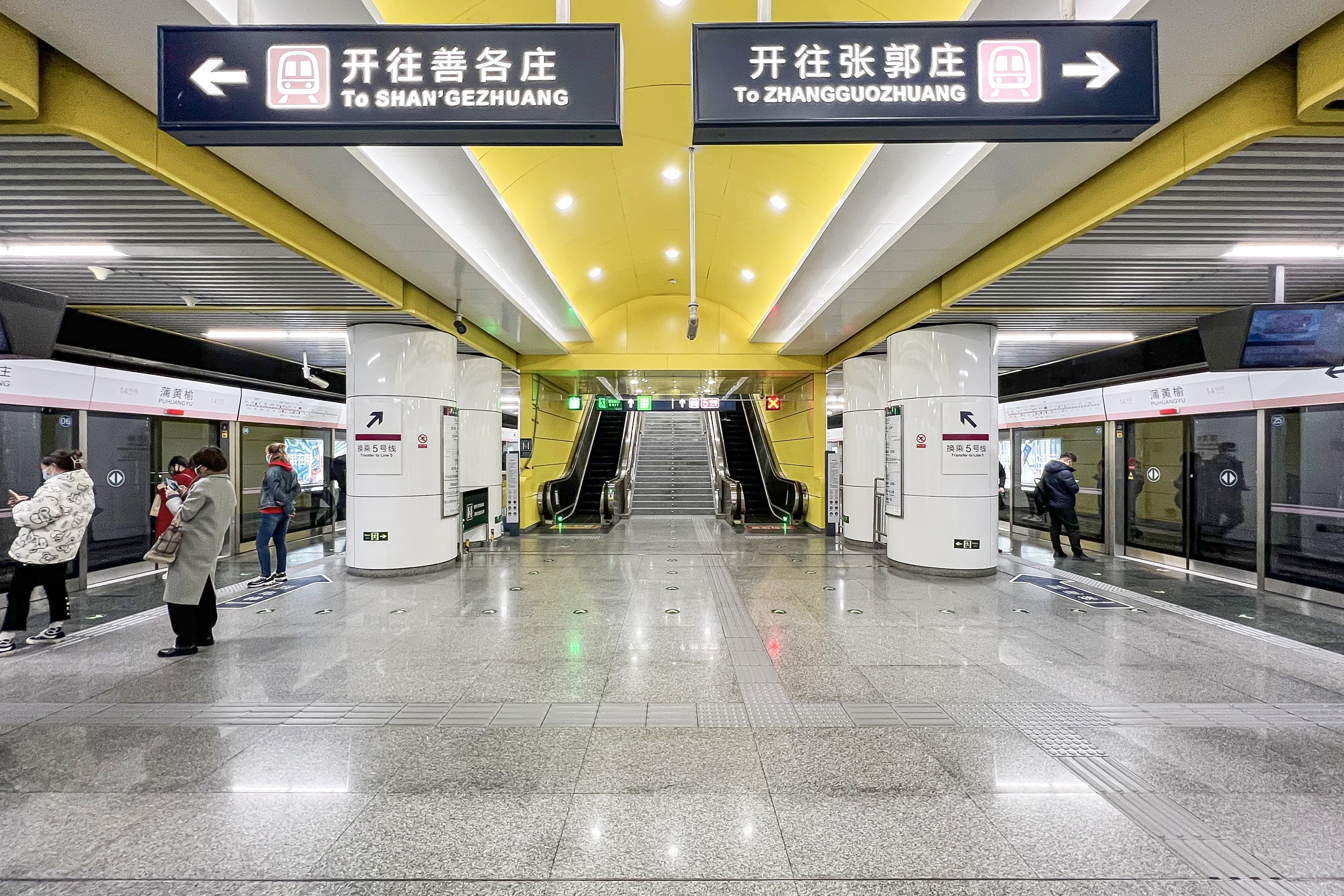
- Line 5 platform Line 14 platform

General information
- Location: Anlelin Road (安乐林路) / Pufang Road (蒲方路) and Puhuangyu Road; Border of Dongtiejiangying Subdistrict and Fangzhuang Subdistrict, Fengtai District, Beijing; China
- Operator: Beijing Mass Transit Railway Operation Corporation Limited (Line 5); Beijing MTR Corporation Limited (Line 14)
- Lines: Line 5; Line 14
- Platforms: 4 (2 island platforms)
- Tracks: 4

Construction
- Structure type: Underground
- Accessible: Yes

History
- Opened: October 7, 2007; 18 years ago (Line 5); December 26, 2015; 10 years ago (Line 14)

Services
Preceding station	Beijing Subway	Following station
Temple of Heaven East Gate towards Tiantongyuanbei	Line 5	Liujiayao towards Songjiazhuang
Jingtai towards Zhangguozhuang	Line 14	Fangzhuang towards Shangezhuang
Location
- Location within Beijing

Puhuangyu Station (simplified Chinese: 蒲黄榆站; traditional Chinese: 蒲黃榆站; pinyin: Púhuángyú Zhàn) is an interchange subway station between Line 5 and Line 14 of the Beijing Subway. Line 14 station was opened on December 26, 2015. The name Puhuangyu combines the first character from the names of three constituent villages: Puzhuang, Huangtukeng, Yushucun.

== Station layout ==
Both the line 5 and 14 stations have underground island platforms.

== Exits ==
There are 7 exits, lettered A, B, C, D, E, F, and G. Exits B and F are accessible.

== Gallery ==
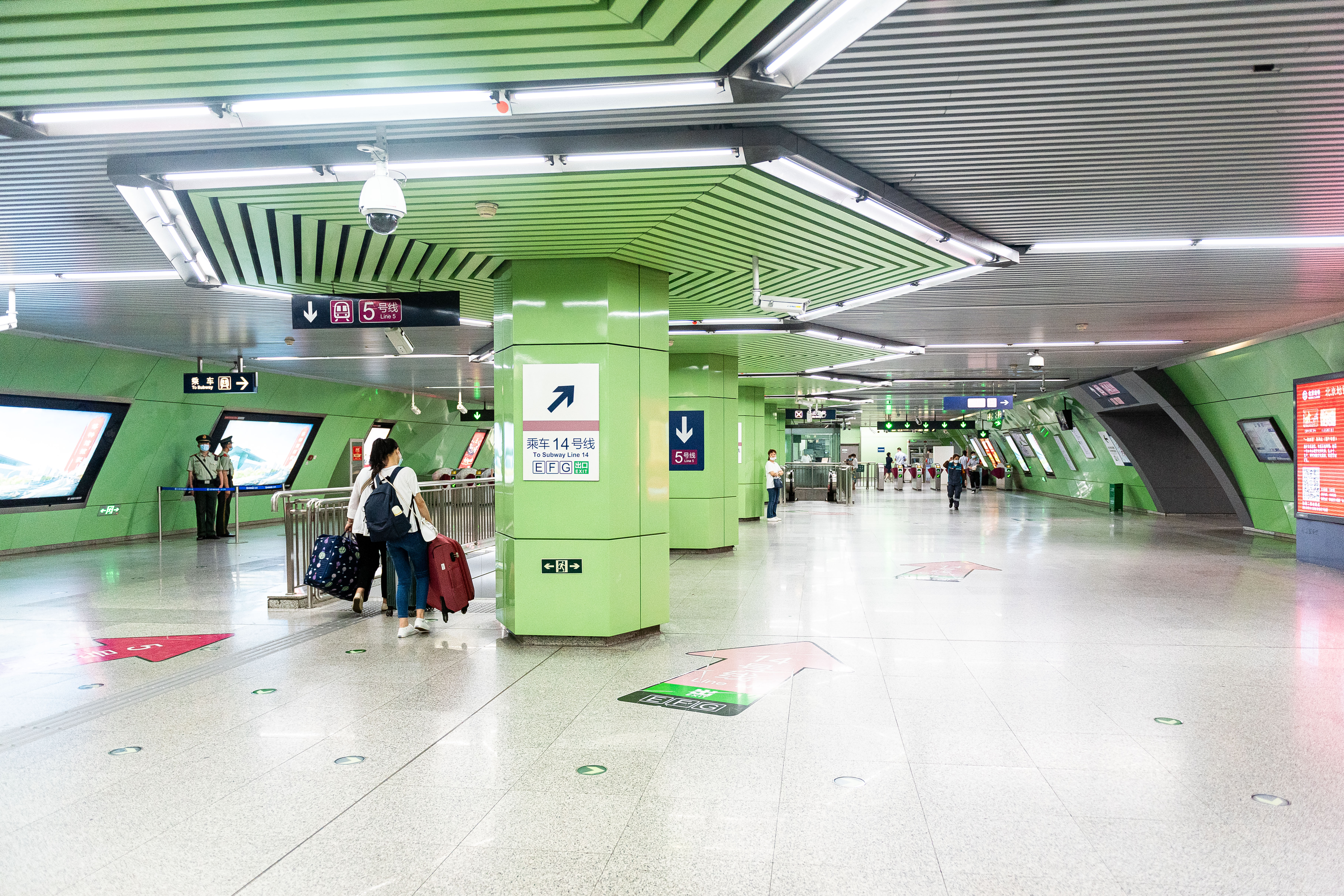
Line 5 concourse

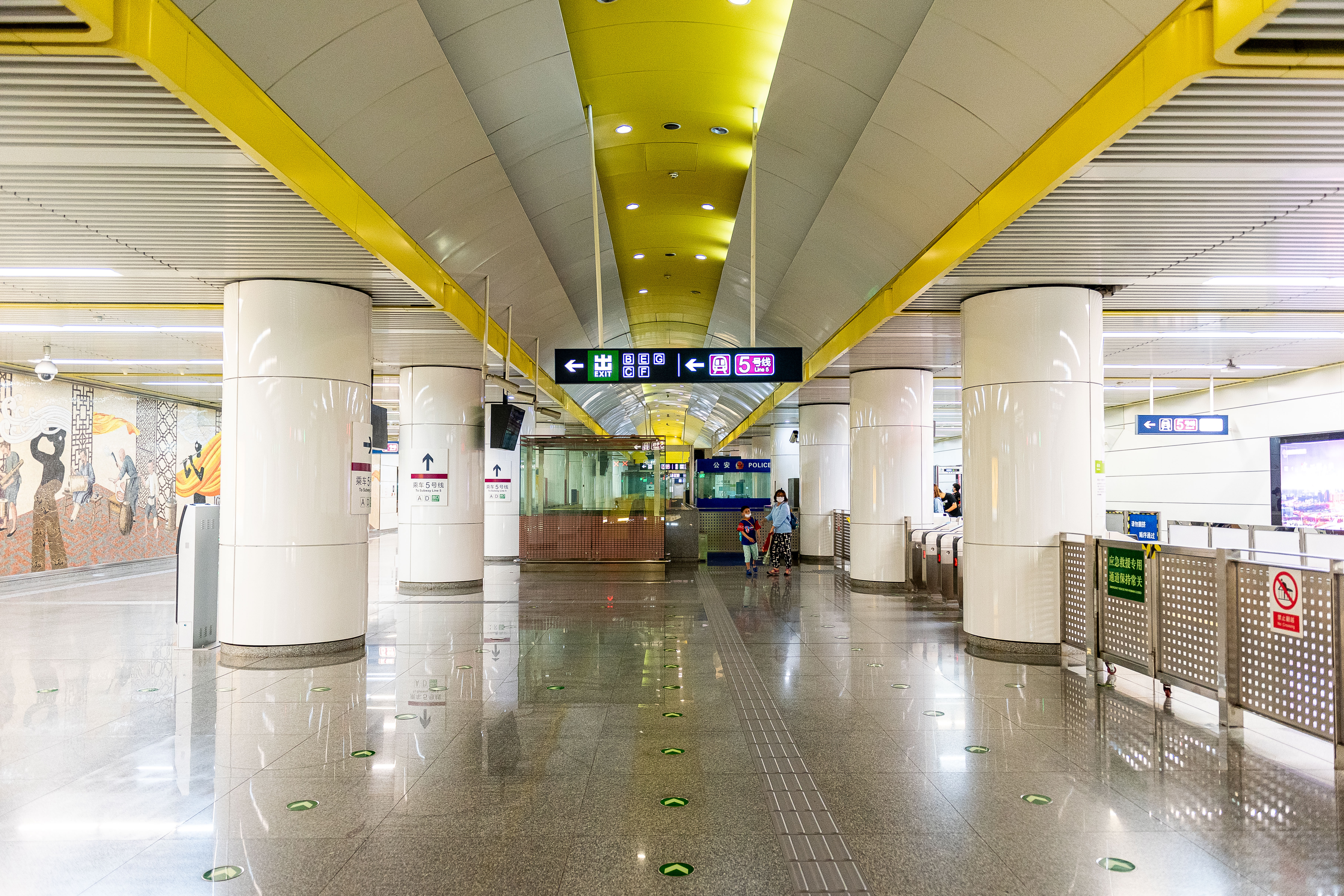
Line 14 concourse
