= Line 5 (Beijing Subway) =

Railway line in Beijing, China

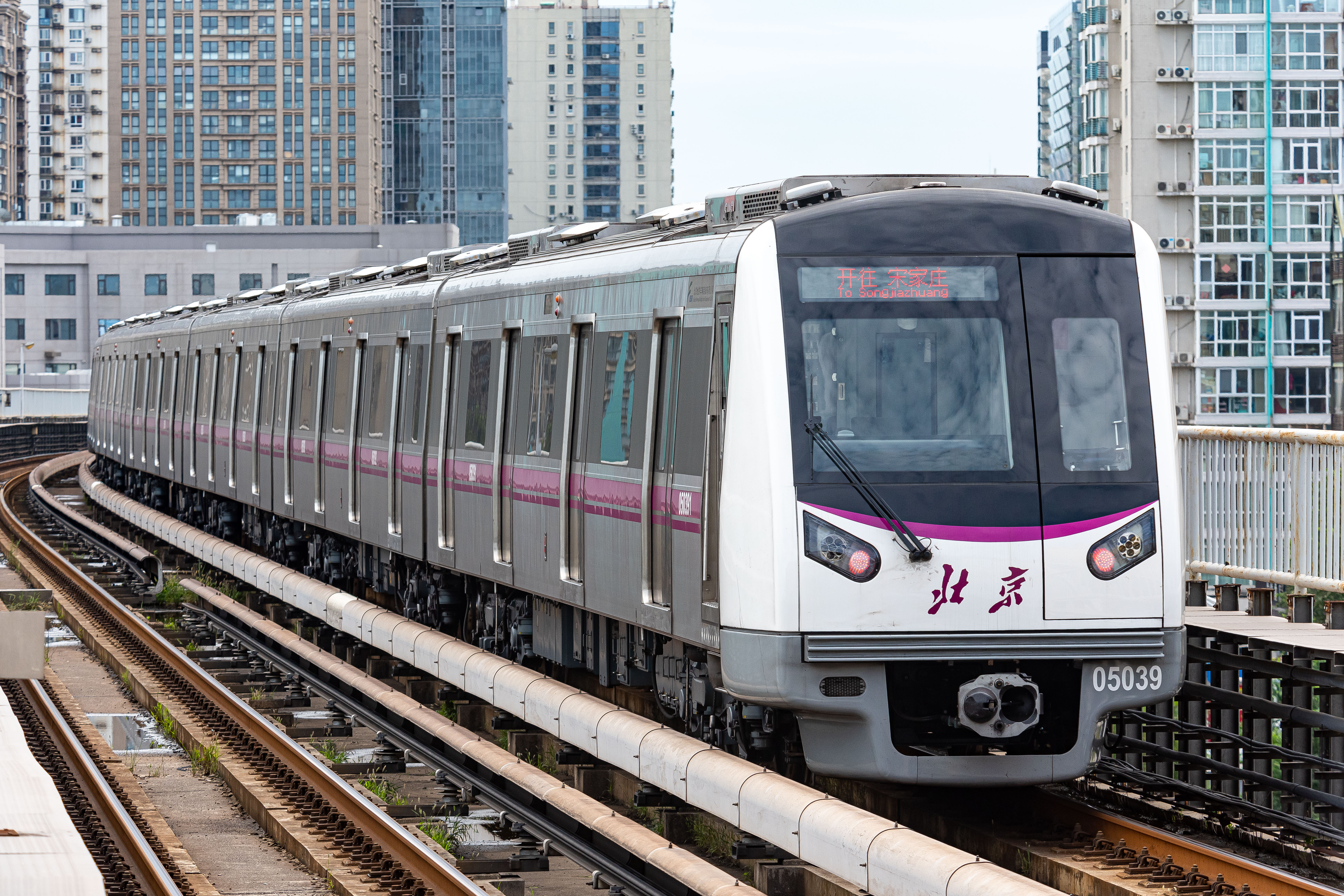
- A train leaving Datunludong station in August 2025

Overview
- Other name: M5 (planned name)
- Status: Operational
- Locale: Fengtai, Dongcheng, Chaoyang, and Changping districts Beijing
- Termini: Tiantongyuanbei; Songjiazhuang
- Stations: 23

Service
- Type: Rapid transit
- System: Beijing Subway
- Operator(s): Beijing Mass Transit Railway Operation Corp., Ltd
- Depot(s): Taipingzhuang, Songjiazhuang Depots
- Rolling stock: 6-car Type B (DKZ13)
- Daily ridership: 713,700 (2024 Avg.); 1,163,000 (2016 Peak)

History
- Opened: October 7, 2007; 19 years ago

Technical
- Line length: 27.6 km (17.1 mi)
- Track gauge: 1,435 mm (4 ft 8 1/2 in)
- Electrification: 750 V DC third rail
- Operating speed: 80 km/h (50 mph) maximum

Line 5 of the Beijing Subway (Chinese: 北京地铁5号线; pinyin: běijīng dìtiě wǔhào xiàn) is a rapid transit line that runs north to south through central Beijing. Line 5's color is maroon. It entered into operation on October 7, 2007. It runs for 27.6 km (17.1 mi) in a near straight line through the city center (just approximately one kilometre (0.62 mi) east of the Forbidden City at Dongdan) from Tiantongyuanbei in Changping District to Songjiazhuang in Fengtai District. Though Line 4 and Line 8 also broadly follow north-south routes (and so, in part, do Lines 14 and 13), Line 5 remains the only line to follow an almost entirely straight north-south course. Line 5 is also notable for including three stations in the densely populated northern suburb of Tiantongyuan, as well as providing convenient access to the Temple of Earth and Temple of Heaven. Since Line 5 connects with Line 1, Line 2 (twice), Line 6, Line 7, Line 10 (twice), Line 13, Line 14 and Line 15, and also links densely populated suburbs directly to the city center, it tends to experience very crowded conditions during rush hour and even very late into the evening. Over 1 million passengers use the line every weekday in 2019.

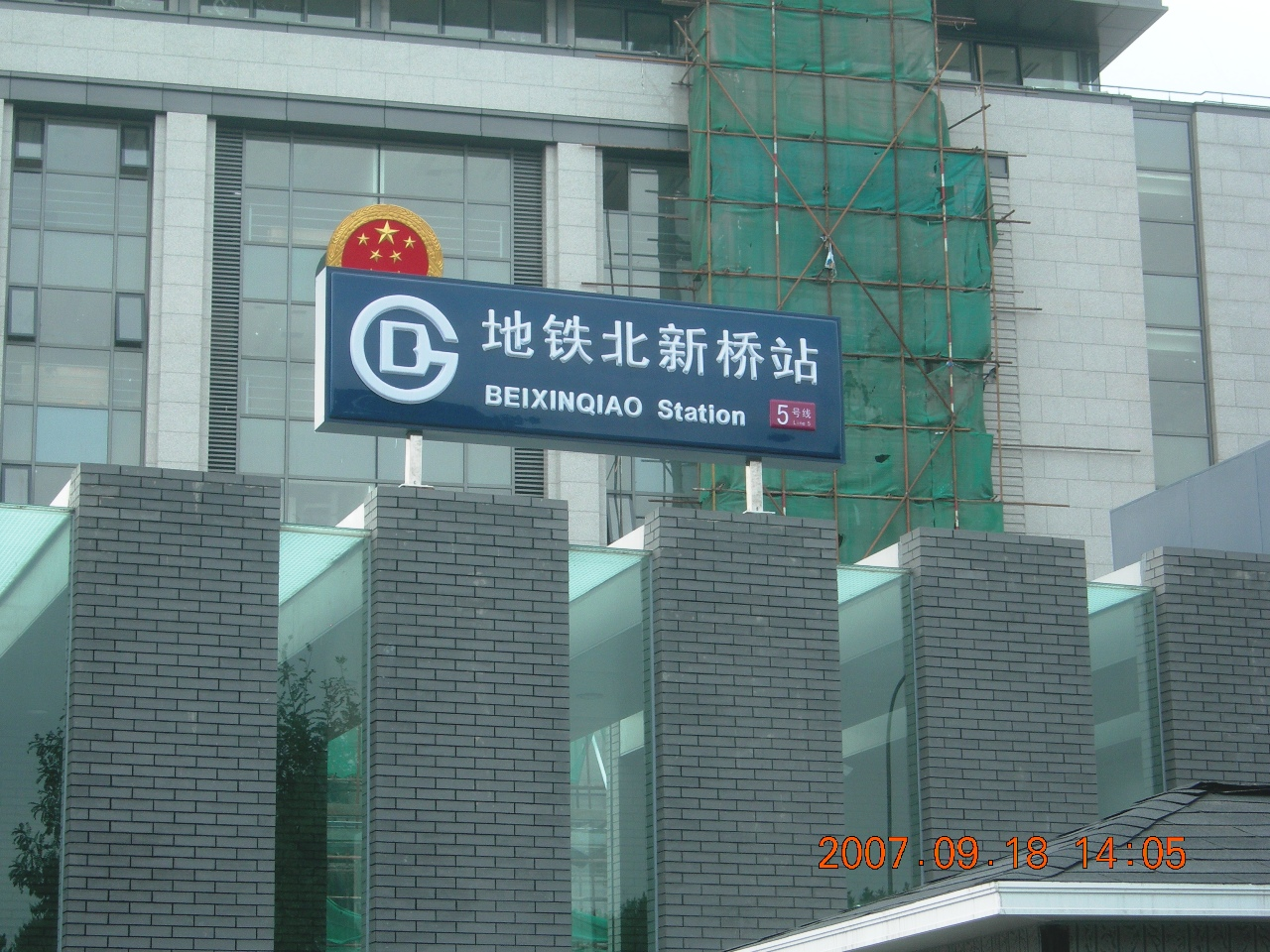
Line 5 entrance at Beixinqiao.

== Hours of operation ==
The first south-bound trains departs from Tiantongyuan North at 4:59 am. The first north-bound train departs from Songjiazhuang at 5:19 am. The last south-bound train leaves Tiantongyuan North at 10:47 pm. The last north-bound train leaves Songjiazhuang at 11:10 pm. For the official timetable, see the reference.

== Route ==
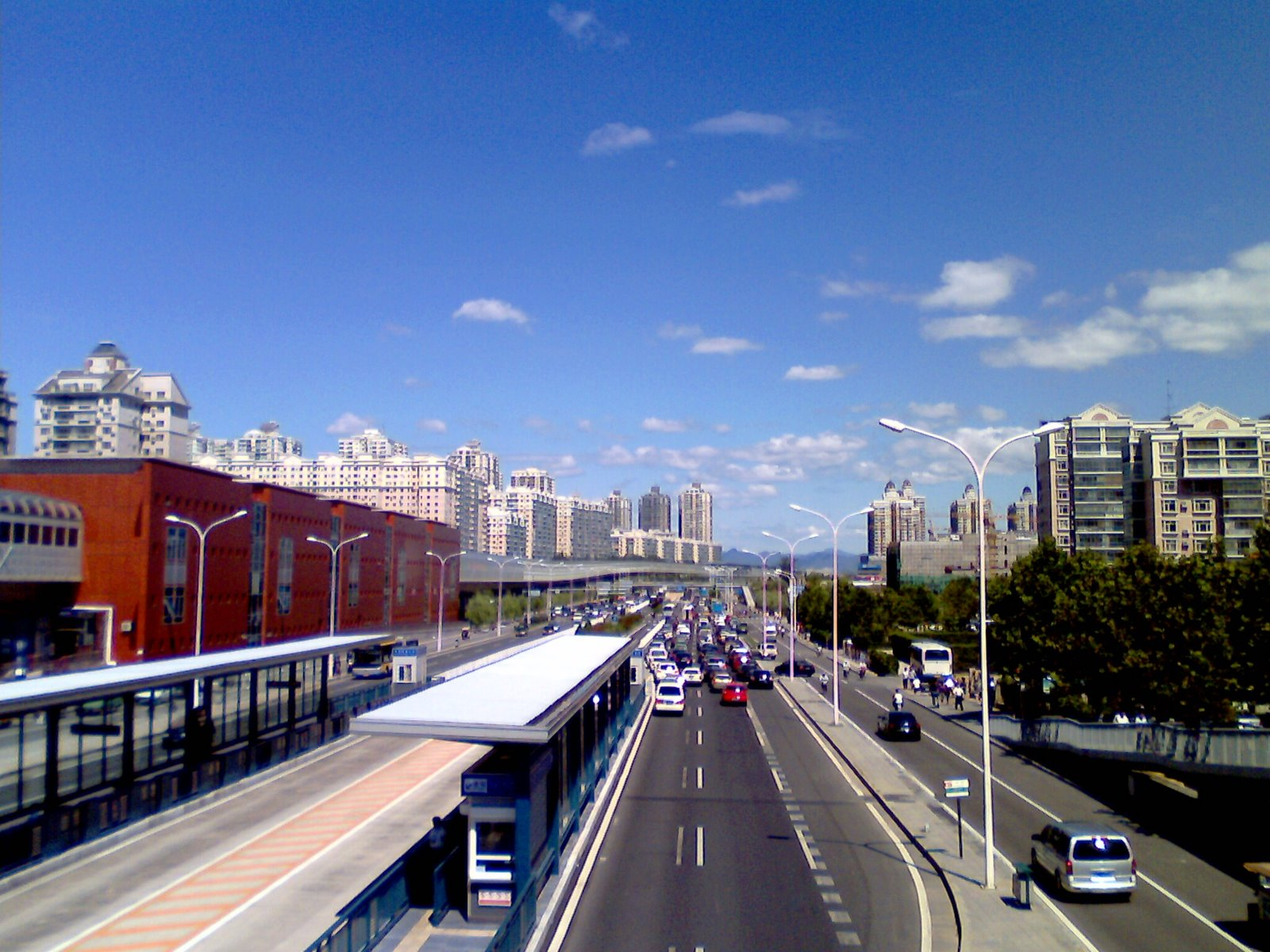
To the left is Tiantongyuannan station; a BRT route is visible in the center.

Line 5 runs in a North-South direction, beginning with three stations in the northern suburb of Tiantongyuan in Changping District, about 5 kilometres (3.1 mi) outside the 5th Ring Road. Then, it enters Chaoyang District and connects to Line 13 at Lishuiqiao. At Datunludong, it connects with Line 15. At Huixin Xijie Nankou, it links up with Line 10 Loop. Further south, it passes immediately to the east of the Temple of Earth and meets the Line 2 Loop at Yonghegong (Lama Temple). Then Line 5 cuts through the old areas of Dongcheng District. It connects with the East-West Line 6 at Dongsi, and the old foreign Legation Quarter between Dongdan and Chongwenmen. Further south, Line 5 stops at Tiantan Dongmen (Temple of Heaven East Gate), connects with the East-West Line 7, as well as Puhuangyu (connects with Line 14) and eventually reaches Songjiazhuang and Line 10 again, in Fengtai District.

== Stations (North to South) ==
●: stop

▲: some SB PM peak trains skip

▼: some NB PM peak trains skip

| Service Route | Station Name | | Connections | Nearby Bus Stops | Travel Time | Distance km | | Location |
| Service Route | English | Chinese | Connections | Nearby Bus Stops | Travel Time | Distance km | | Location |
|---|---|---|---|---|---|---|---|---|
| ● | Tiantongyuanbei | 天通苑北 | | 426 428 430 441 487 520 533 537 643 860 905 922 922区 933 966 984 BRT3(快速公交3) 昌27 昌27专 C110 C112 C114 C118 C120 C121 快速直达专线18 快速直达专线77 快速直达专线103 快速直达专线158 快速直达专线164 快速直达专线220 专35 专42 专117 专137 | 0:00 | 0.000 | 0.000 | Changping |
| ▲ | Tiantongyuan | 天通苑 | 18 | 319 426 430 432 465 520 621 905 966 984 BRT3(快速公交3) 昌27专 快速直达专线60 专20 专58 专104 专119 专133 专136 专137 | 0:02 | 0.939 | 0.939 | Changping |
| ▲ | Tiantongyuannan | 天通苑南 | | 301 319 426 430 432 465 520 558 621 905 966 984 BRT3(快速公交3) 昌27专 快速直达专线168 专58 | 0:04 | 0.965 | 1.904 | Changping |
| ● | Lishui Qiao | 立水桥 | 13 | 301 319 426 430 465 558 617 621 628 905 966 984 BRT3(快速公交3) 昌27专 快速直达专线60 快速直达专线168 | 0:06 | 1.544 | 3.448 | Chaoyang |
| ● | Lishuiqiaonan | 立水桥南 | | 319 430 465 617 620 621 628 905 966 快速直达专线60 快速直达专线183 专48 专81 专107 专164 专197 专213 | 0:09 | 1.305 | 4.753 | Chaoyang |
| ● | Beiyuanlubei | 北苑路北 | | 141 319 415 430 466 484 569 593 596 617 620 653 695 905 快速直达专线183 夜26 专37 专120 | 0:11 | 1.286 | 6.039 | Chaoyang |
| ● | Datunludong | 大屯路东 | 15 | 311 319 415 425 430 484 538 569 596 620 695 夜26 专40 | 0:15 | 3.000 | 9.039 | Chaoyang |
| ● | Huixin Xijie Beikou | 惠新西街北口 | | 18 84 379 386 400 400快 406 407 408 419 430 490 567 613 658 快速直达专线147 夜26 夜28 | 0:17 | 1.838 | 10.877 | Chaoyang |
| ● | Huixin Xijie Nankou | 惠新西街南口 | 10 | 95 125 361 430 515 921 944 夜26 | 0:19 | 1.122 | 11.999 | Chaoyang |
| ● | Heping Xiqiao | 和平西桥 | 12 | 75 95 117 125 300 302 328 361 368 430 547 601 604 607 641 671 921 快速直达专线178 夜26 夜30 | 0:21 | 1.025 | 13.024 | Chaoyang |
| ● | Hepingli Beijie | 和平里北街 | | 104 117 125 430 | 0:23 | 1.059 | 14.083 | Dongcheng |
| ● | Yonghegong Lama Temple | 雍和宫 | 2 | 13 18 44 75 84 115 117 125 130 142 200 夜20 | 0:26 | 1.151 | 15.234 | Dongcheng |
| ● | Beixinqiao | 北新桥 | Capital Airport | 13 82 84 106 107 115 117 135 612 | 0:28 | 0.866 | 16.100 | Dongcheng |
| ● | Zhangzizhong Lu | 张自忠路 | | 3 4 13 82 84 106 113 115 118 夜3 夜34 | 0:30 | 0.791 | 16.891 | Dongcheng |
| ● | Dongsi | 东四 | 6 | 58 84 101 106 109 110 128 夜13 | 0:32 | 1.016 | 17.907 | Dongcheng |
| ● | Dengshi Kou | 灯市口 | | 84 104 106 108 110 111 128 | 0:34 | 0.848 | 18.755 | Dongcheng |
| ● | Dongdan | 东单 | 1 | 1 1区 41 52 84 104 106 108 110 111 120 128 140 夜1 | 0:36 | 0.945 | 19.700 | Dongcheng |
| ● | Chongwen Men | 崇文门 | 2 | 8 9 12 17 24 29 39 41 44 60 63 84 103 104 106 108 110 111 128 137 142 599 622 夜5 夜19 夜24 夜28 | 0:38 | 0.821 | 20.521 | Dongcheng |
| ● | Ciqi Kou | 磁器口 | 7 | 17 23 39 41 57 60 84 106 108 128 137 599 夜7 夜24 夜28 | 0:40 | 0.876 | 21.397 | Dongcheng |
| ▼ | Temple of Heaven East Gate | 天坛东门 | | 6 17 24 34 35 36 39 41 54 60 72 84 128 599 958 快速直达专线6 夜24 | 0:42 | 1.183 | 22.580 | Dongcheng |
| ▼ | Puhuangyu | 蒲黄榆 | 14 | 25 39 53 54 91 122 128 141 200 599 821 957 夜24 夜28 专161 专162 专202 | 0:44 | 1.900 | 24.480 | Fengtai |
| ▼ | Liujiayao | 刘家窑 | | 2 7 12 39 50 51 54 93 139 300 300快 368 599 649 665 687 821 827 829 839 848 881 943 954 957 973 997 夜23 夜24 夜30 专202 | 0:46 | 0.905 | 25.385 | Fengtai |
| ● | Songjiazhuang | 宋家庄 | 10 Yizhuang | 2 39 84 139 141 366 511 524 526 555 576 581 990 快速直达专线116 快速直达专线211 夜28 专62 | 0:48 | 1.670 | 27.055 | Fengtai |

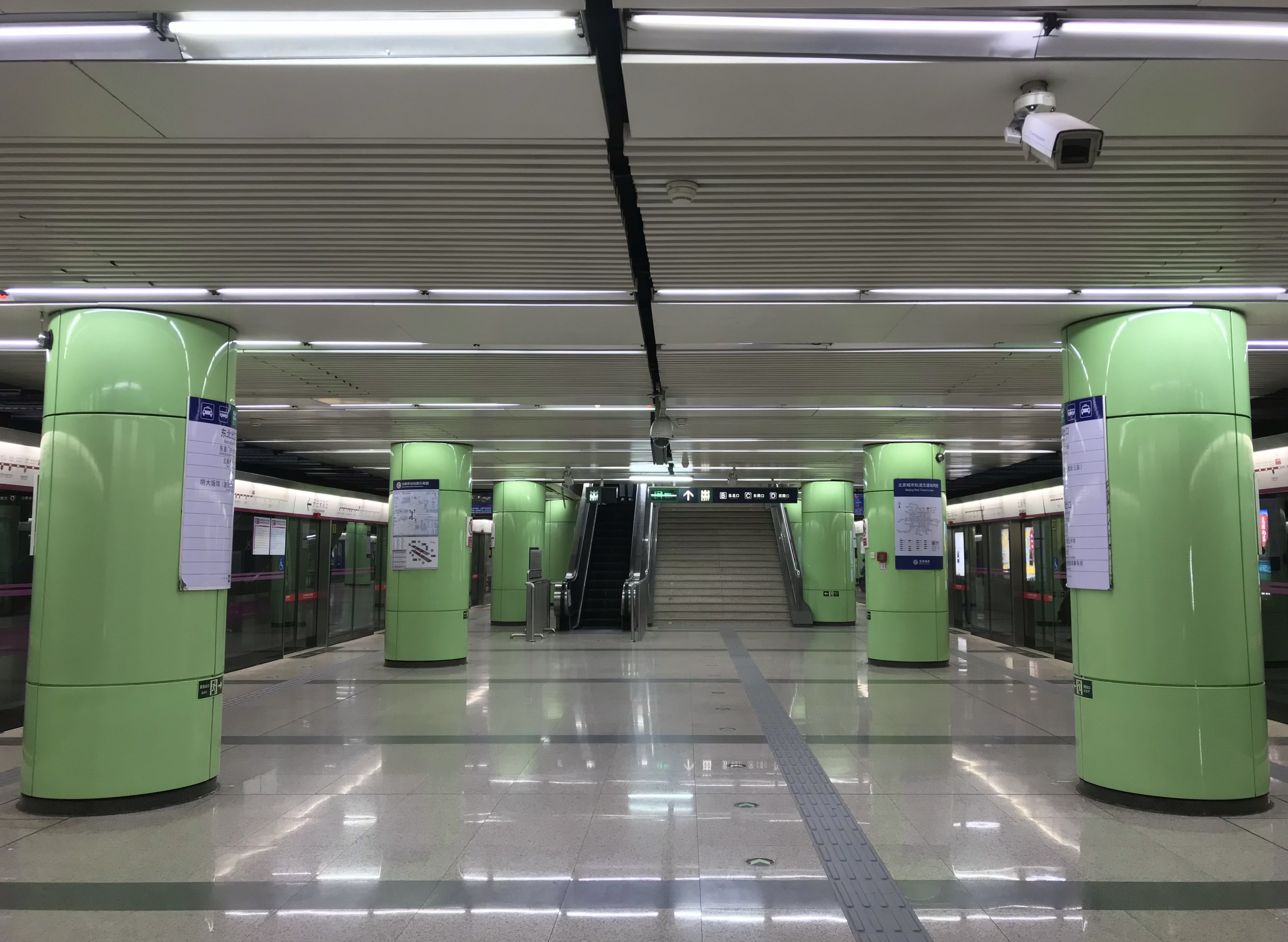
Beixinqiao Station

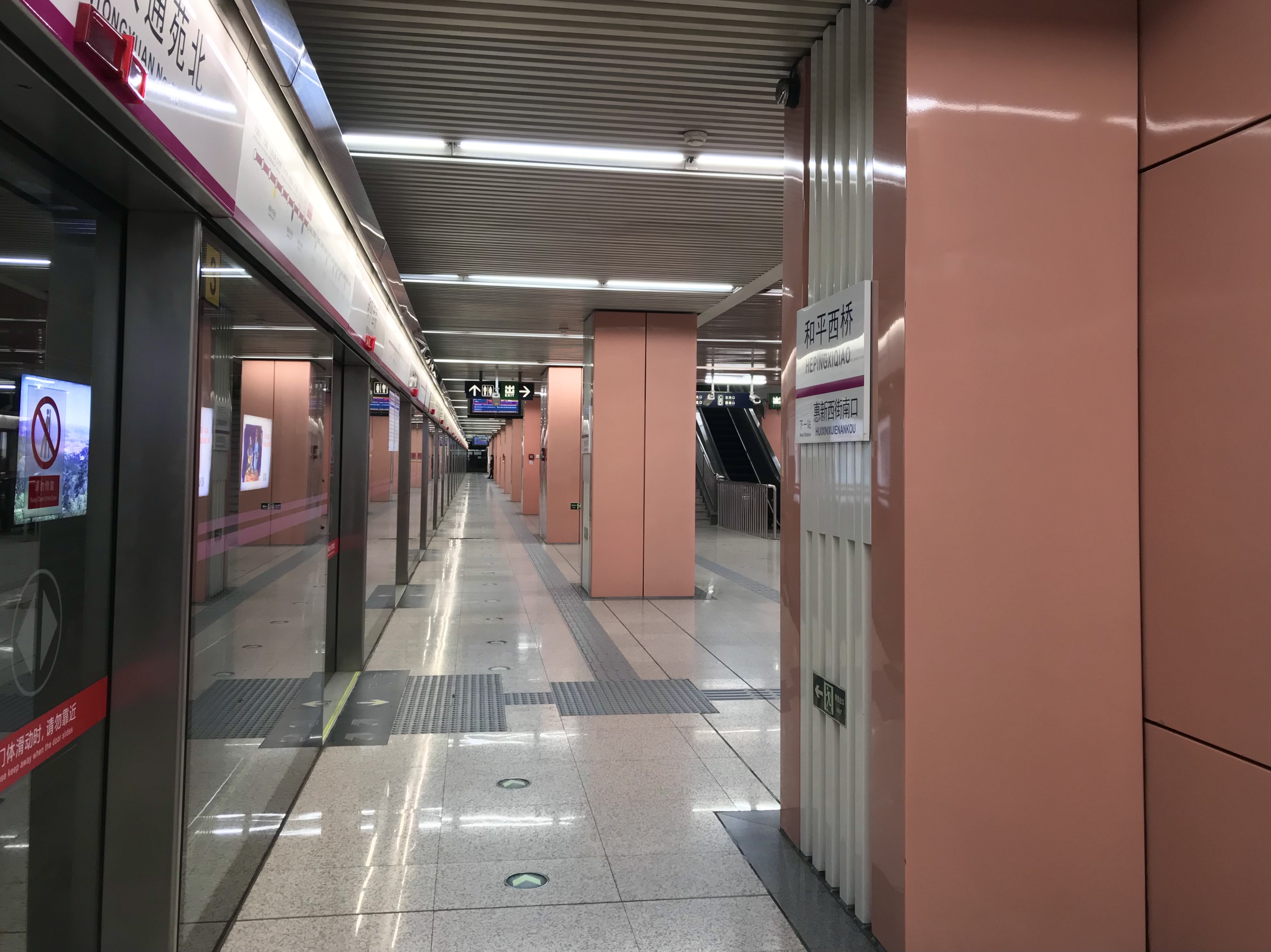
Heping Xiqiao Station

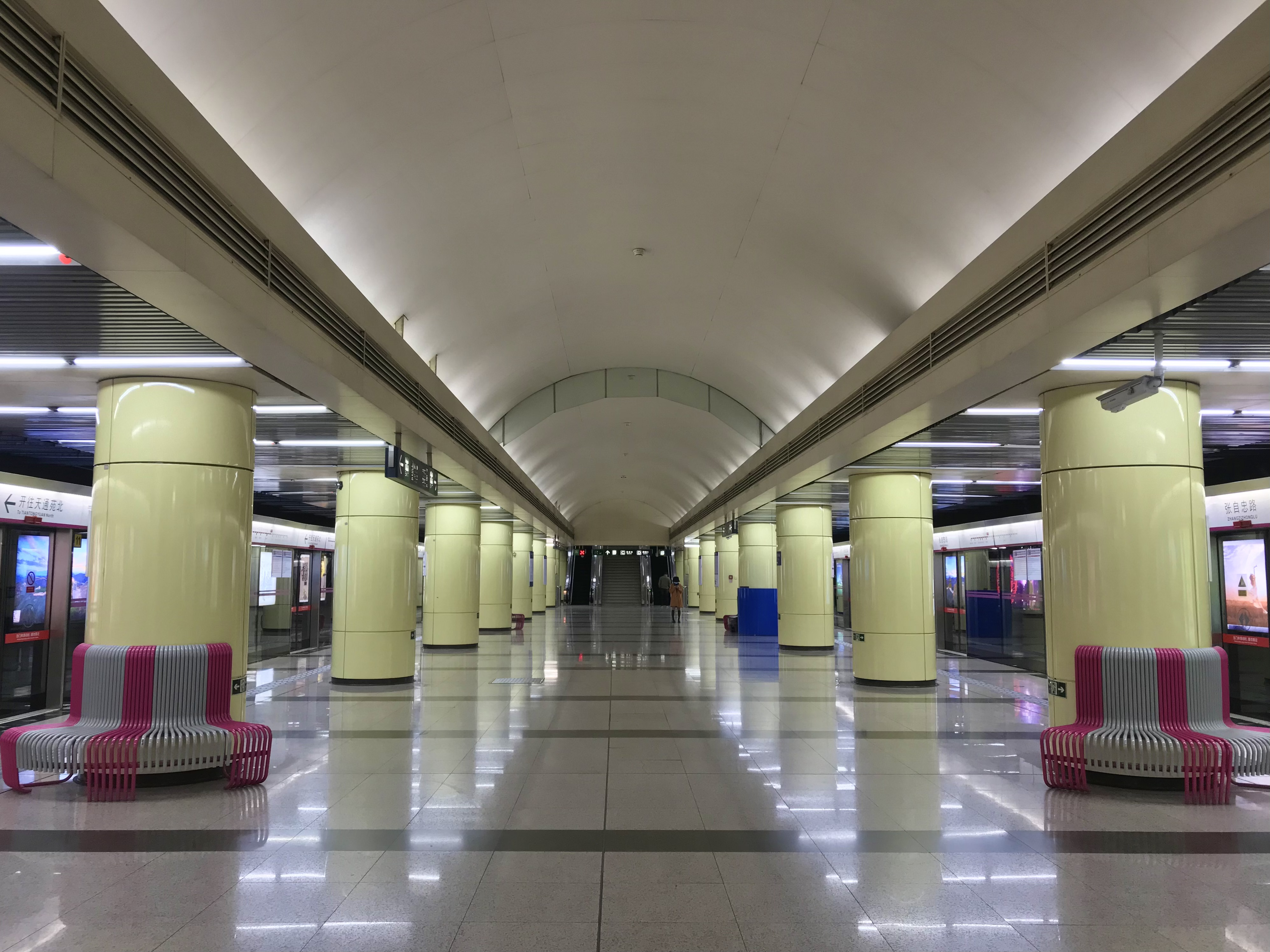
Zhangzizhong Lu Station

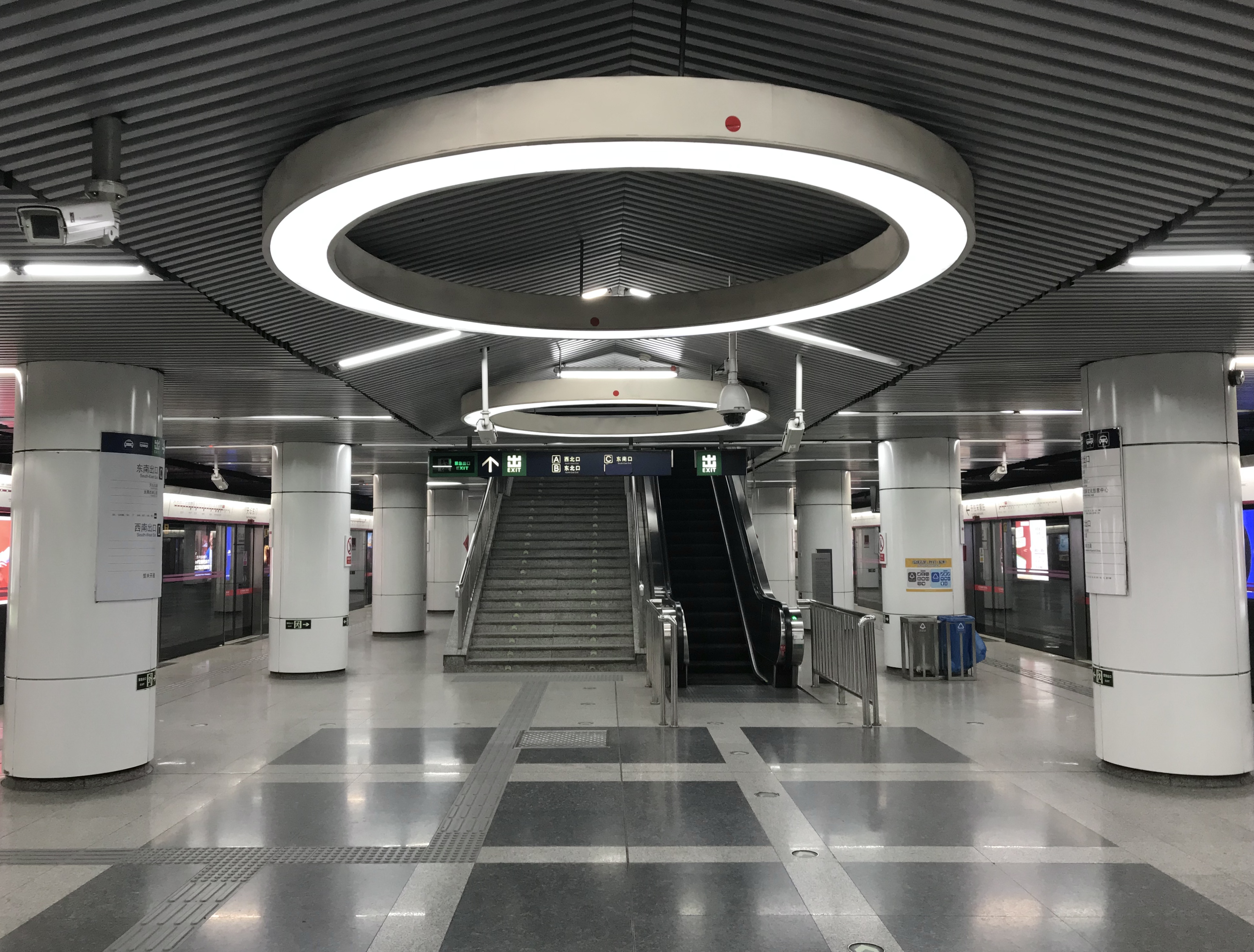
Temple of Heaven East Gate station

=== Technology ===
Line 5 was the first subway line in Beijing to feature platform screen doors in underground stations and automatic platform gates in elevated stations that prevent riders from falling onto the tracks. Line 5 stations also have LCD screens that display the wait times for the next train. Line 5 trains have digital voice announcements (in Mandarin and English) and LCD passenger information displays.

| Line 5 platform at Dongdan with platform screen doors | Platform doors. | Articulated, interconnected cars on Line 5. | LCD inside Line 5 train. |

== History ==
Construction work on Line 5 got underway in late 2002 and the line opened to the public on October 7, 2007.

=== Timeline ===
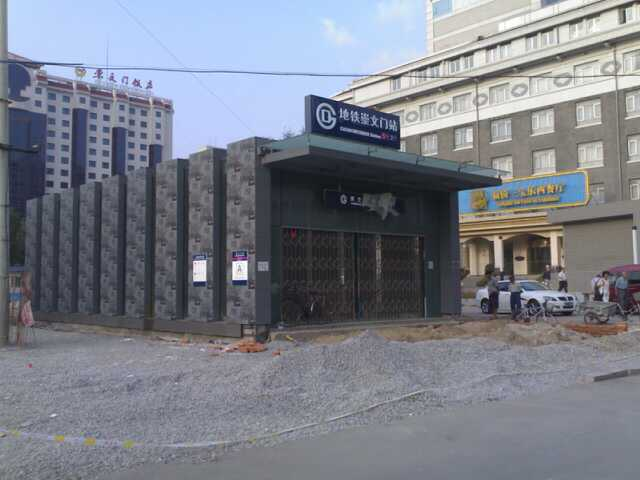
Station entrance at Chongwenmen prior to Line 5's opening.

- December 28, 2002: Construction on Line 5 began.
- March 28, 2004: Tunneling started underneath Yonghegong Lama Temple and Hepingli Beijie stations, marking the start of Line 5 construction in urban Beijing. The tunnel would pass the Temple of Heaven.
- May 20, 2004: The tunnel between Yonghegong Lama Temple and Zhangzizhonglu stations broke through.
- November 11, 2005: Railway tracks were laid at Huixinxijie Beikou station.
- July 2006: The entire underground railway was completed.
- September 2006: Platform screen doors began installation in Line 5 stations.
- April 2007: Line 5 started trial runs without passengers.
- October 7, 2007: Line 5 opened to the public at 2 p.m.
- November 23, 2007: Sound insulation were installed on the elevated parts of Line 5 following complaints of excess noise from nearby residents.

| Segment | Commencement | Length | Station(s) | Name |
|---|---|---|---|---|
| Songjiazhuang — Tiantongyuanbei | 7 October 2007 | 27.6 km (17.15 mi) | 23 | (initial phase) |

== Rolling stock ==
| Model | Image | Manufacturer | Year built | Amount in service | Fleet numbers | Depot |
|---|---|---|---|---|---|---|
| DKZ13 | | CRRC Changchun Railway Vehicles; Beijing Subway Rolling Stock Equipment | 2006 | 61 | TP401–TP461 | Taipingzhuang; Songjiazhuang |
