= Temple of Heaven East Gate station =

Beijing Subway station

Temple of Heaven East Gate 天坛东门
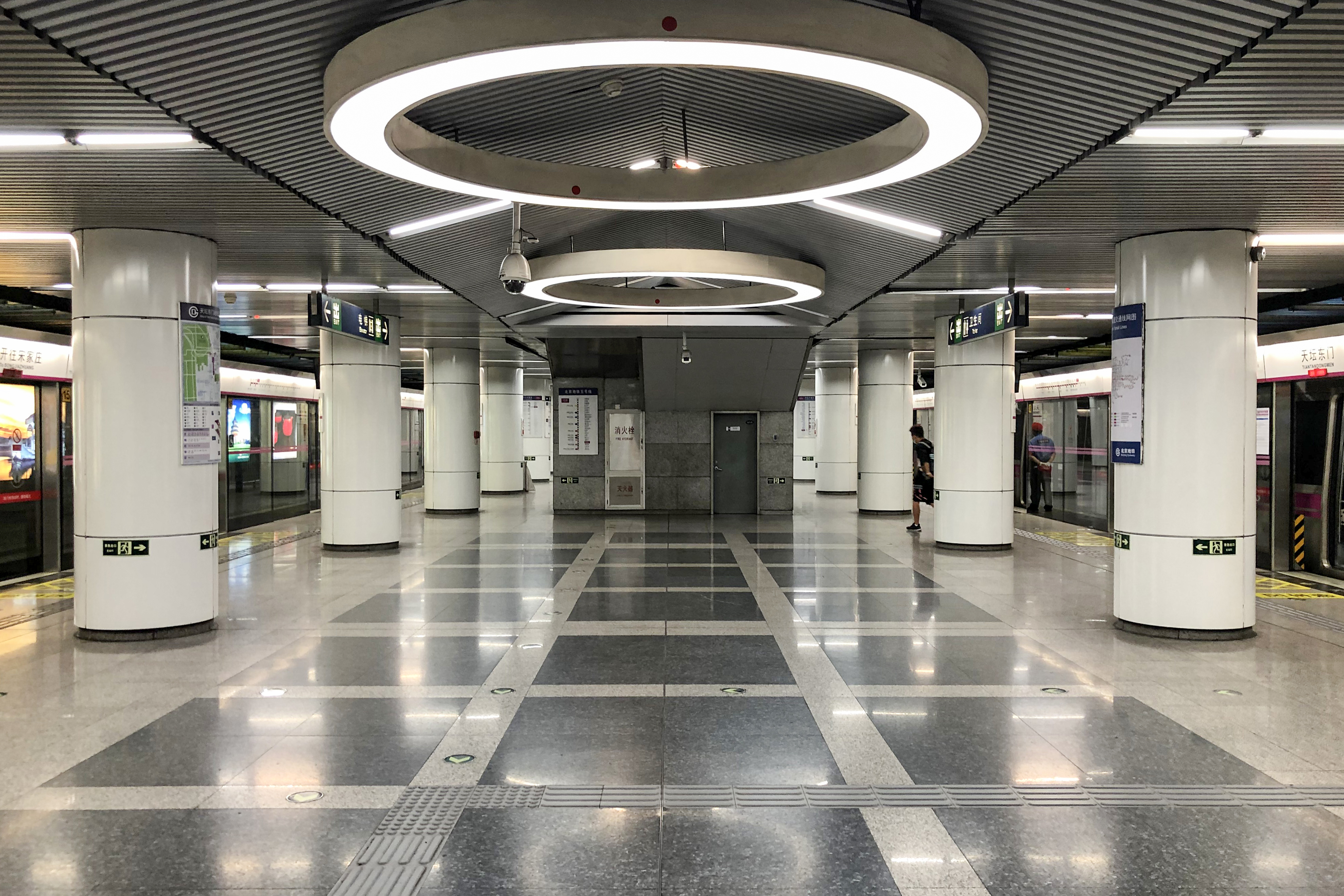
- Platform in July 2020

General information
- Location: Tiantan East Road (天坛东路) and Tiyuguan Road (体育馆路); Dongcheng District, Beijing; China
- Coordinates: 39.8825°N 116.4208°E
- Operator: Beijing Mass Transit Railway Operation Corporation Limited
- Line: Line 5
- Platforms: 2 (1 island platform)
- Tracks: 2

Construction
- Structure type: Underground
- Accessible: Yes

History
- Opened: October 7, 2007; 18 years ago

Services
Preceding station	Beijing Subway	Following station
Ciqi Kou towards Tiantongyuanbei	Line 5	Puhuangyu towards Songjiazhuang
Location
- Location within Beijing

Temple of Heaven East Gate station (simplified Chinese: 天坛东门站; traditional Chinese: 天壇東門站; pinyin: Tiāntán Dōngmén zhàn) is a station on Line 5 of the Beijing Subway. The station's name refers to the east gate of the Temple of Heaven, where it is located.

== Station layout ==
The station has an underground island platform.

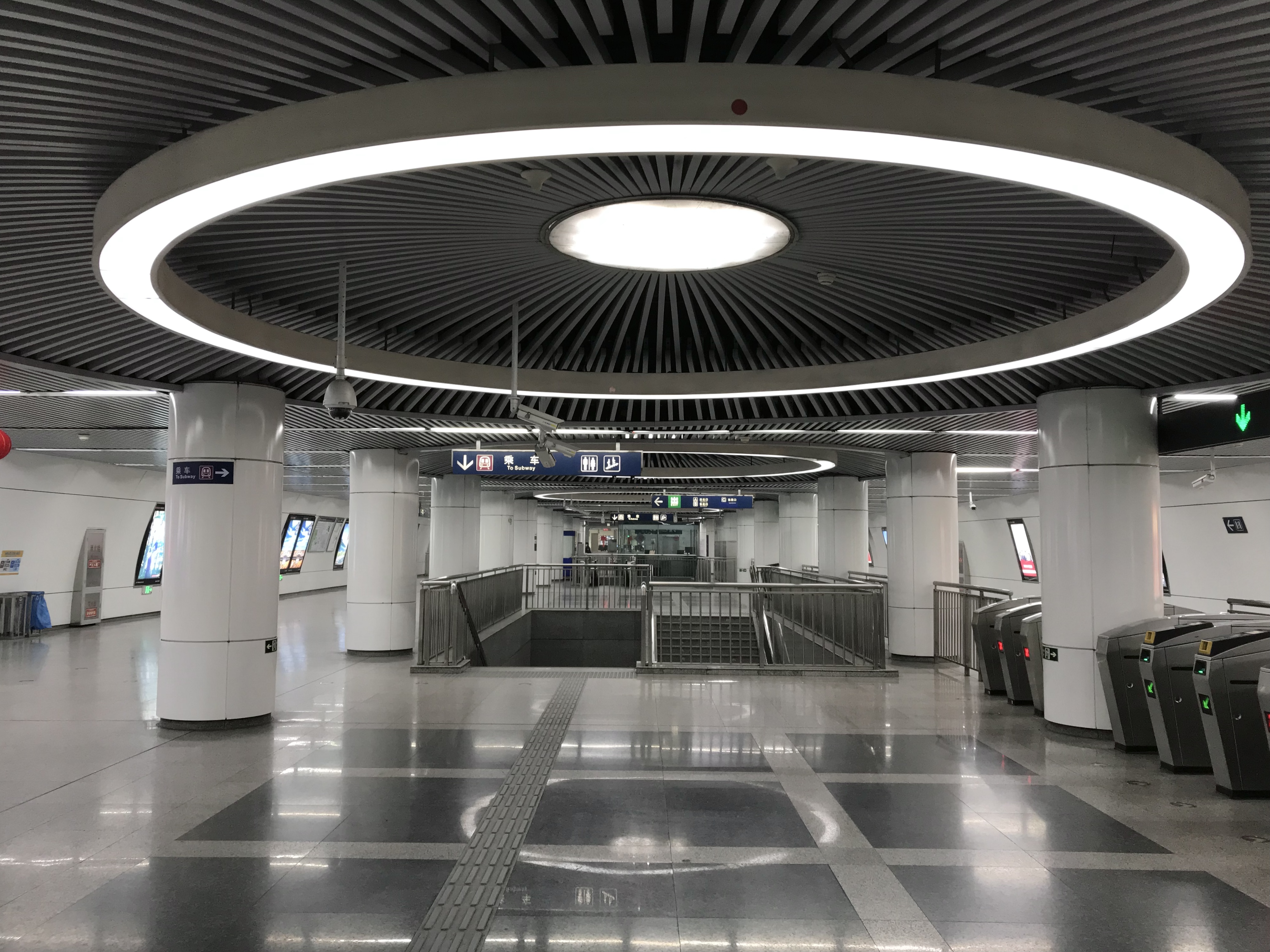
Concourse (February 2021)

== Exits ==
There are three exits, lettered A2, B, and C. Exits B and C are accessible.
