= Wanyuan Jie station =

Beijing Subway station

Wanyuan Jie 万源街
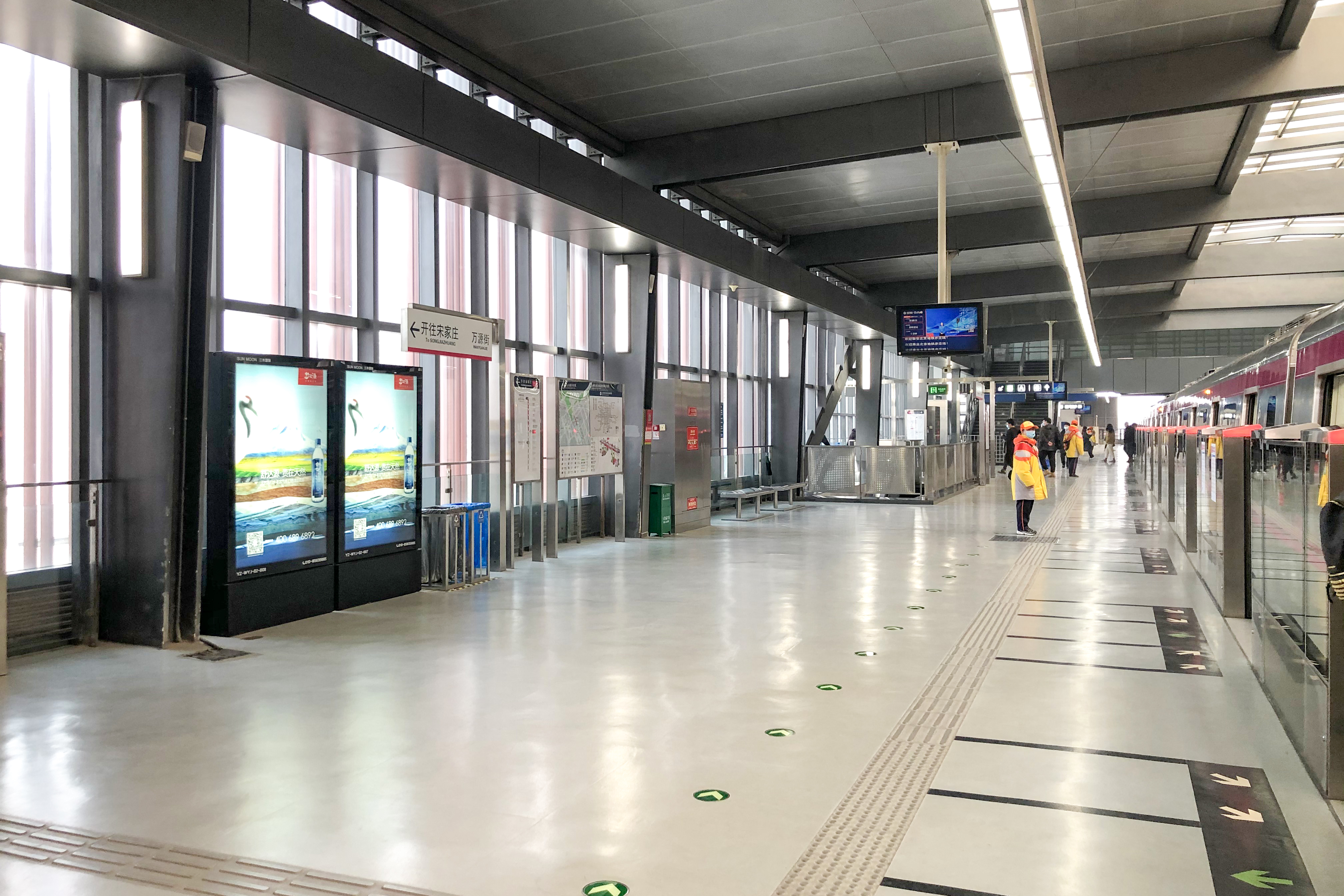
- Platform

General information
- Location: North Hongda Road (宏达北路) and Wanyuan Street (万源街); Daxing District, Beijing; China
- Coordinates: 39°48′11″N 116°30′20″E
- Operator: Beijing Mass Transit Railway Operation Corporation Limited
- Line: Yizhuang line
- Platforms: 2 (2 side platforms)
- Tracks: 2

Construction
- Structure type: Elevated
- Accessible: Yes

History
- Opened: December 30, 2010; 15 years ago

Services
Preceding station	Beijing Subway	Following station
Yizhuang Culture Park towards Songjiazhuang	Yizhuang line	Rongjing Dongjie towards Yizhuang railway station
Location
- Location within Beijing

Wanyuan Jie Station (simplified Chinese: 万源街站; traditional Chinese: 萬源街站; pinyin: Wànyuán Jiē Zhàn) is a Subway station on the Yizhuang Line of the Beijing Subway. It opened on December 30, 2010, together with the other stations on the line.

== Station layout ==
The station has 2 elevated side platforms.

== Exits ==
There are 2 exits, lettered A1 and B1. Exit A1 is accessible.
