= Rongjing Dongjie station =

Beijing Subway station

Rongjing Dongjie 荣京东街
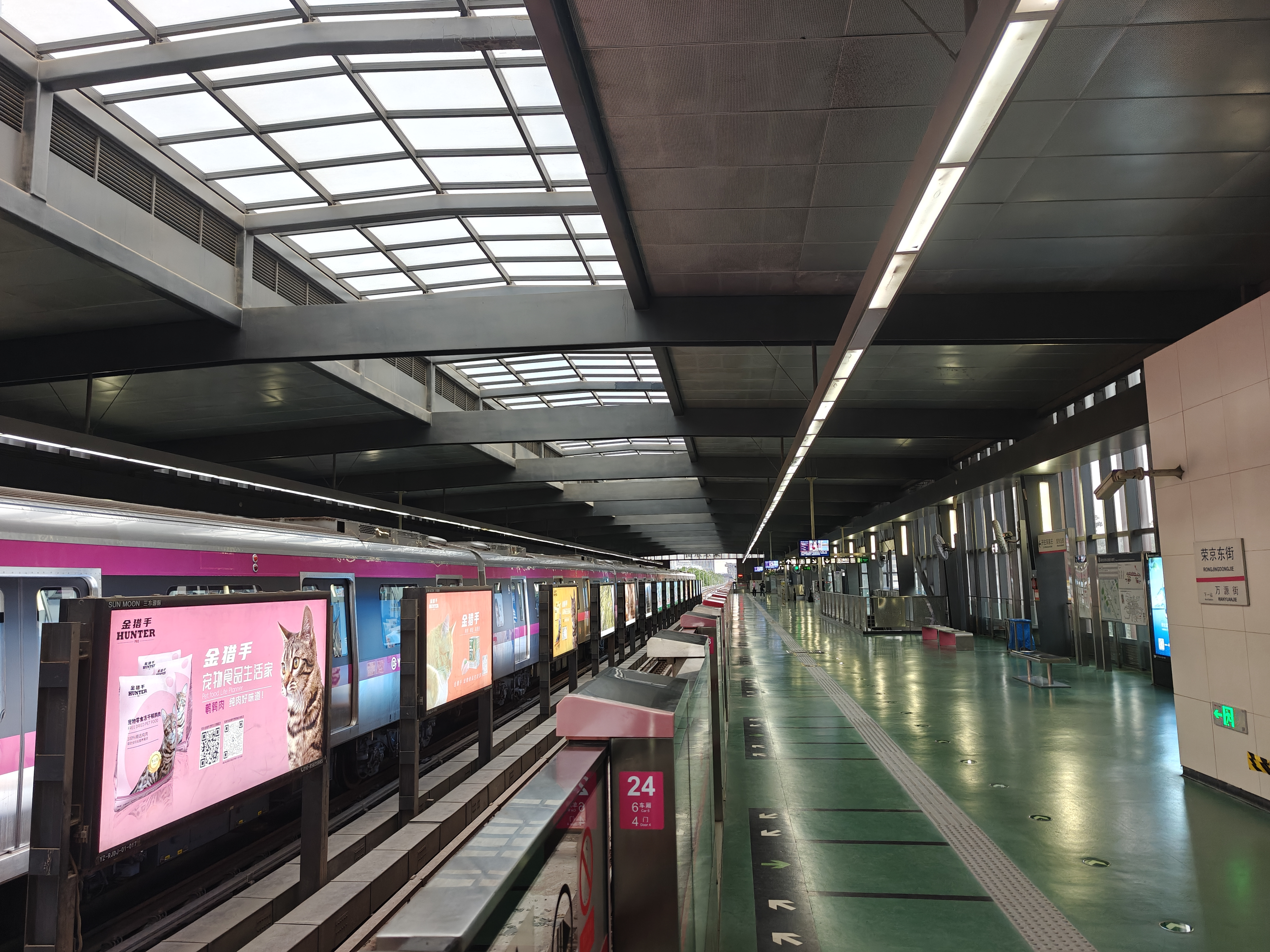
- Platform

General information
- Location: North Hongda Road (宏达北路) and Rongjing East Street (荣京东街); Daxing District, Beijing; China
- Coordinates: 39°47′37″N 116°30′48″E
- Operator: Beijing Mass Transit Railway Operation Corporation Limited
- Line: Yizhuang line
- Platforms: 2 (2 side platforms)
- Tracks: 2

Construction
- Structure type: Elevated
- Accessible: Yes

History
- Opened: December 30, 2010; 15 years ago

Services
| Preceding station | Beijing Subway | Following station |
|---|---|---|
| Wanyuan Jie towards Songjiazhuang | Yizhuang line | Rongchang Dongjie towards Yizhuang railway station |
Location
- Location within Beijing

Rongjing Dongjie Station (simplified Chinese: 荣京东街站; traditional Chinese: 榮京東街站; pinyin: Róngjīng Dōngjiē Zhàn) is a Subway station on the Yizhuang Line of the Beijing Subway. It opened on December 30, 2010, together with the other stations on the line.

== Station layout ==
The station has 2 elevated side platforms.

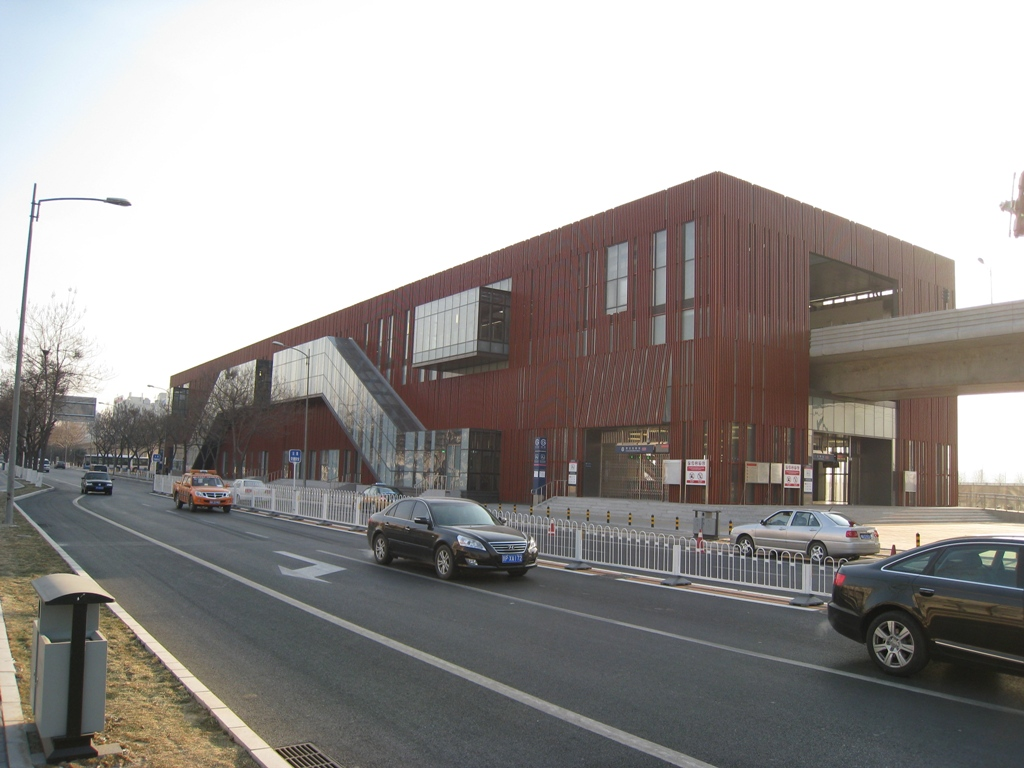
The exterior of the station

== Exits ==
There are 2 exits, lettered A1 and B1. Exit A1 is accessible.
