= Rongchang Dongjie station =

Beijing Subway station

Rongchang Dongjie 荣昌东街
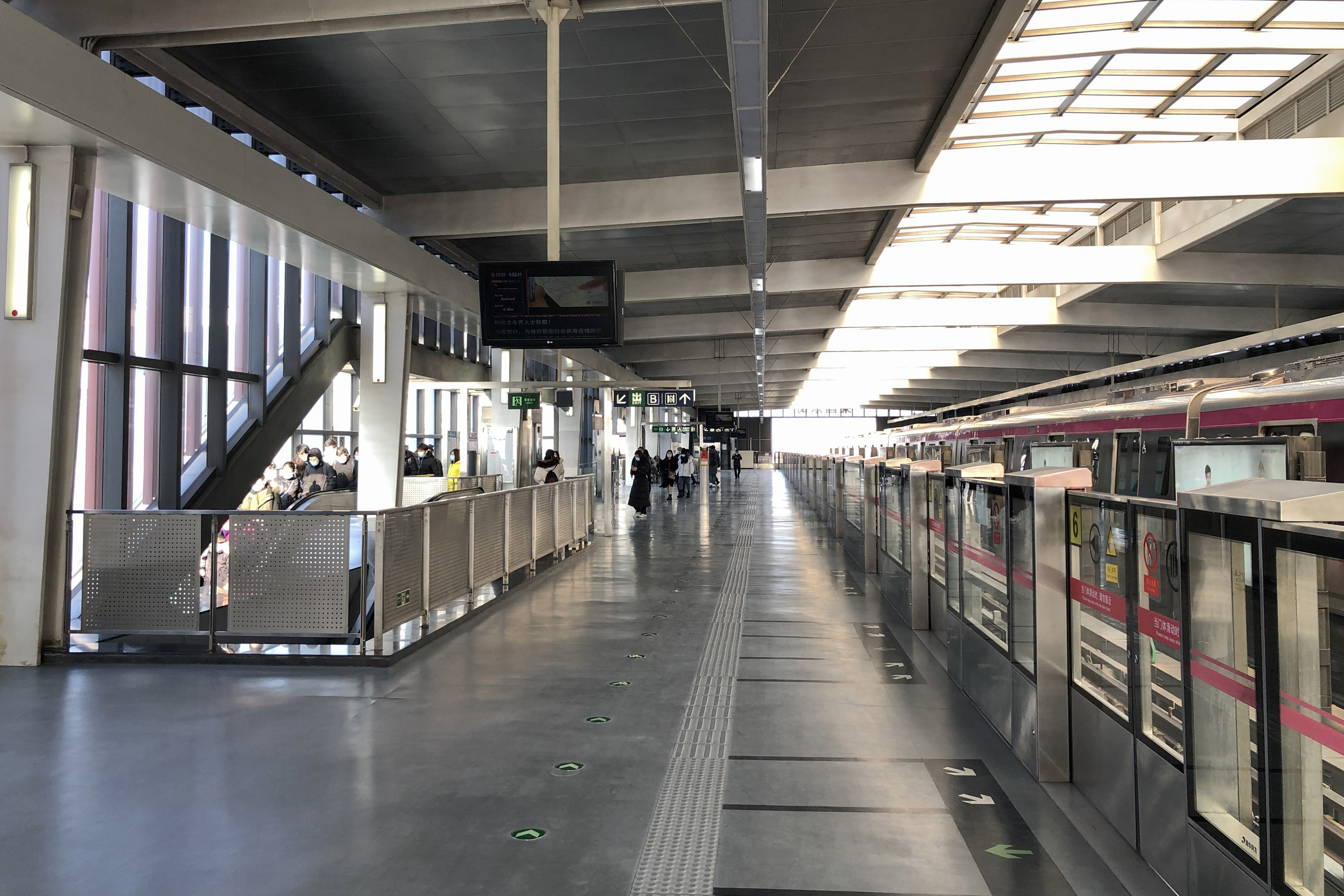
- Eastbound platform

General information
- Location: North Hongda Road (宏达北路) and Rongchang East Street (荣昌东街); Daxing District, Beijing; China
- Coordinates: 39°46′59″N 116°31′18″E
- Operator: Beijing Mass Transit Railway Operation Corporation Limited
- Lines: Yizhuang line Line T1 (Beijing Yizhuang Tram)
- Platforms: 2 (2 side platforms)
- Tracks: 2

Construction
- Structure type: Elevated
- Accessible: Yes

History
- Opened: December 30, 2010; 15 years ago (Yizhuang line); 2020 (Yizhuang T1 line)

Services
Preceding station	Beijing Subway	Following station
Rongjing Dongjie towards Songjiazhuang	Yizhuang line	Tongji Nanlu towards Yizhuang railway station
Yizhuang Tongren towards Quzhuang	Yizhuang T1 line	Beijing Etrong Int'l Exhibition & Convention Center towards Dinghaiyuan
Location
- Location within Beijing

Rongchang Dongjie Station (simplified Chinese: 荣昌东街站; traditional Chinese: 榮昌東街站; pinyin: Róngchāng Dōngjiē Zhàn) is a subway station on the Yizhuang Line of the Beijing Subway. It opened on December 30, 2010, together with the other stations on the line.

As of 2020, it is an interchange station with the Yizhuang T1 line.

The station has two elevated side platforms.

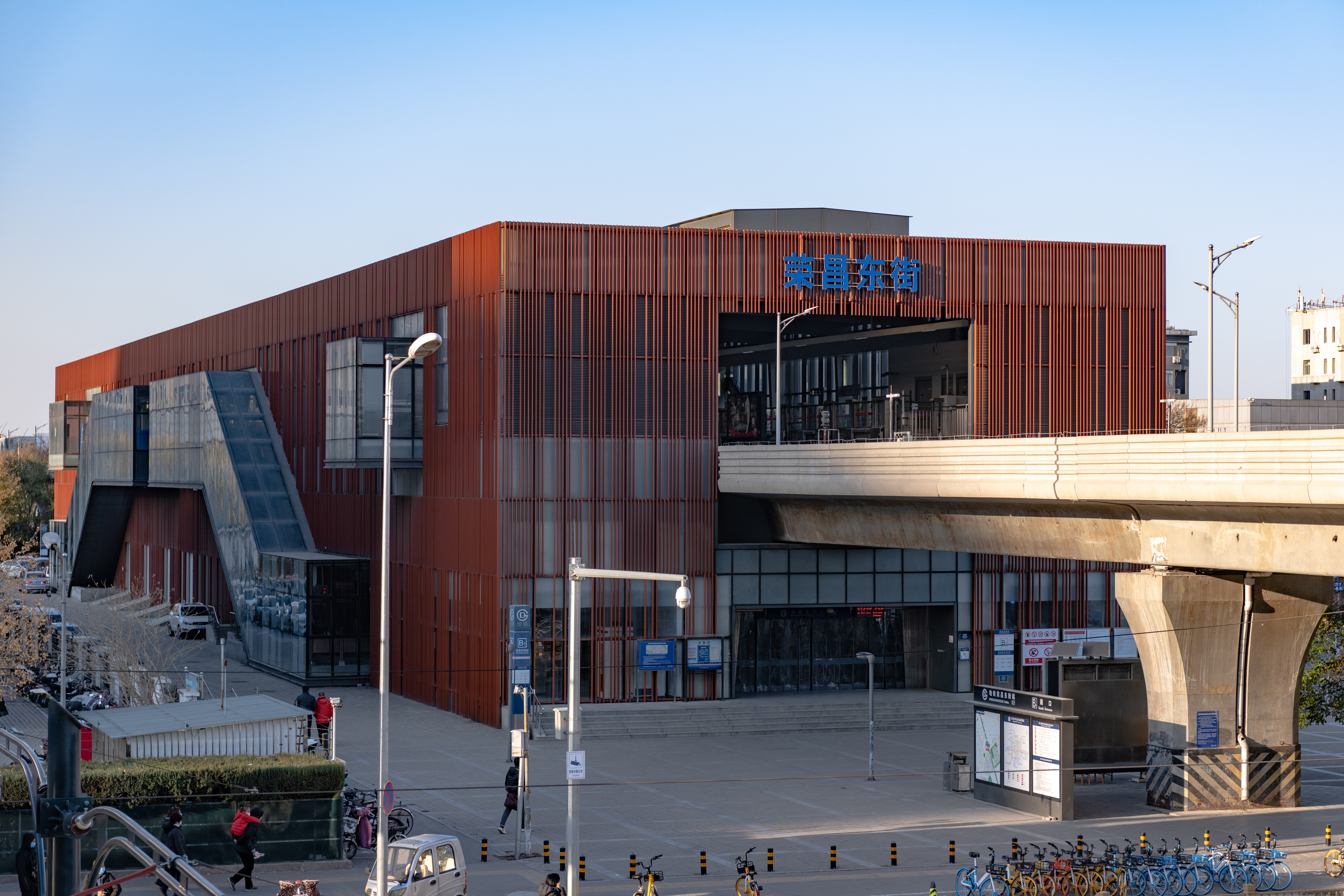
Exterior
