= Tongji Nanlu station =

Beijing Subway station

Tongji Nanlu 同济南路
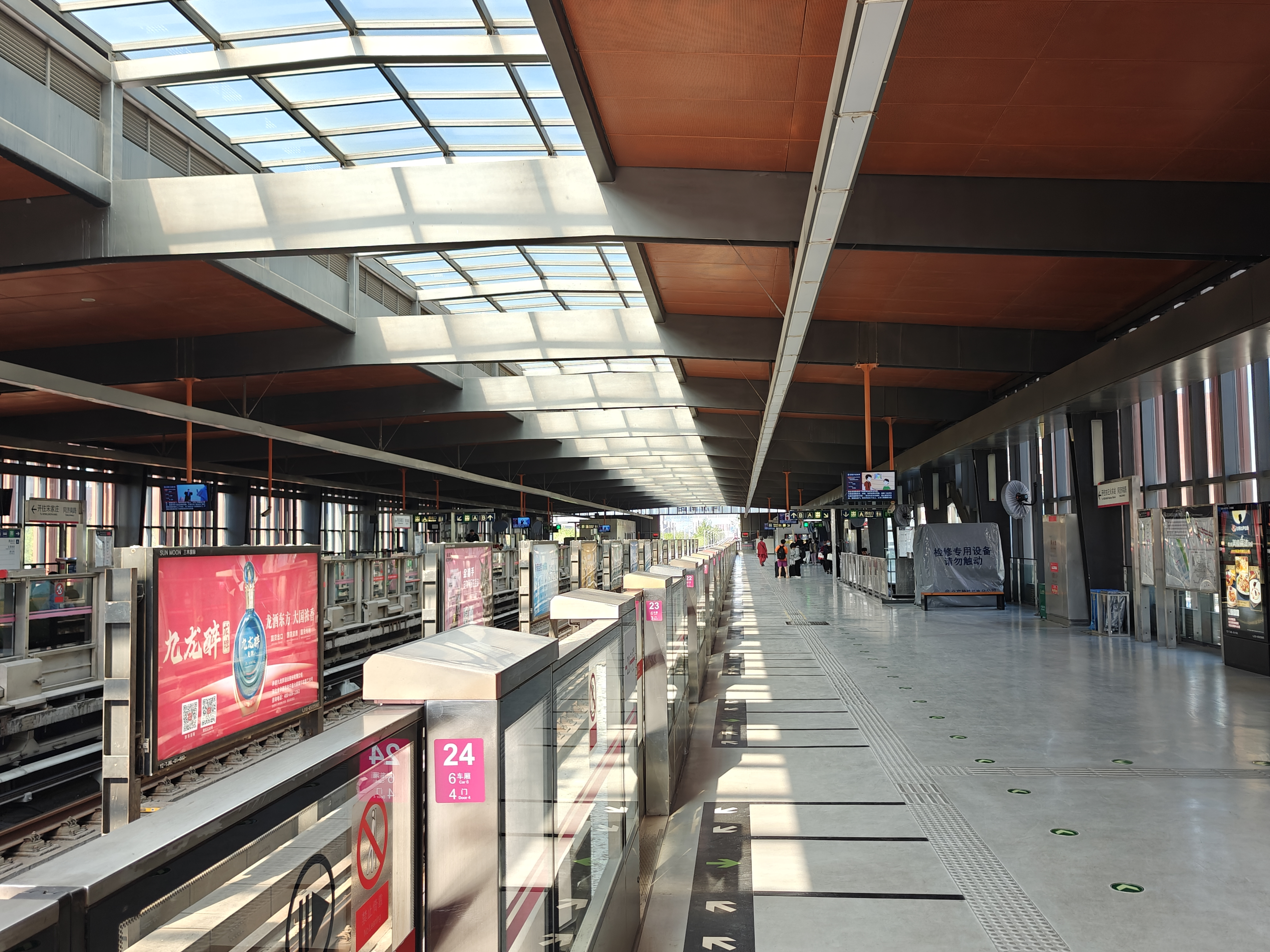
- Eastbound platform

General information
- Location: Kangding Street (康定街) and South Tongji Road (同济南路); Tongzhou District, Beijing; China
- Coordinates: 39°46′23″N 116°32′23″E
- Operator: Beijing Mass Transit Railway Operation Corporation Limited
- Line: Yizhuang line
- Platforms: 3 (1 island platform and 1 side platform)
- Tracks: 3

Construction
- Structure type: Elevated
- Accessible: Yes

History
- Opened: December 30, 2010; 15 years ago

Services
Preceding station	Beijing Subway	Following station
Rongchang Dongjie towards Songjiazhuang	Yizhuang line	Jinghai Lu towards Yizhuang railway station
Location
- Location within Beijing

Tongji Nanlu Station (simplified Chinese: 同济南路站; traditional Chinese: 同濟南路站; pinyin: Tóngjì Nánlù Zhàn; lit. 'Tongji South Road station') is a Subway station on the Yizhuang Line of the Beijing Subway. It opened on December 30, 2010, together with the other stations on the line.

== Station layout ==
The station has an elevated island and side platform.

== Exits ==
The station has 2 exits, lettered A1 and B1. Exit A1 is accessible.
