= Ciqunan station =

Beijing Subway station

Ciqunan 次渠南
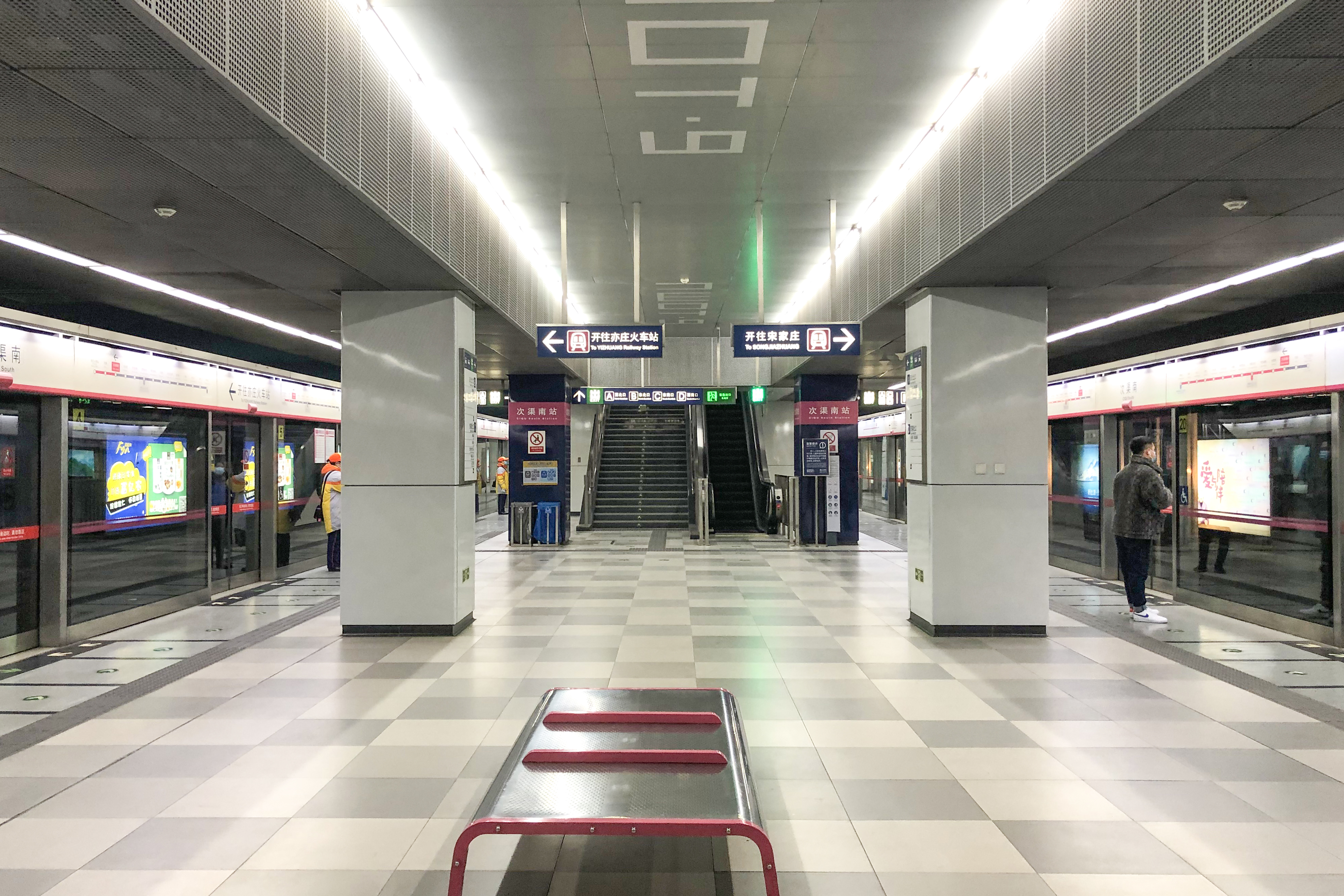
- Platform

General information
- Location: Taihu, Tongzhou District, Beijing; China
- Coordinates: 39°47′41″N 116°34′52″E
- Operator: Beijing Mass Transit Railway Operation Corporation Limited
- Line: Yizhuang line
- Platforms: 2 (1 island platform)
- Tracks: 2

Construction
- Structure type: Underground
- Accessible: Yes

History
- Opened: December 30, 2010; 15 years ago

Services
Preceding station	Beijing Subway	Following station
Jinghai Lu towards Songjiazhuang	Yizhuang line	Ciqu towards Yizhuang railway station
Location
- Location within Beijing

Ciqunan station (Chinese: 次渠南站; pinyin: Cìqúnán zhàn) is a subway station on the Yizhuang line of the Beijing Subway. It opened on December 30, 2010, together with the other stations on the line.

== Station layout ==
The station has an underground island platform.

== Exits ==
There are 4 exits, lettered A, B, C, and D. Exits B and D are accessible.
