= Yizhuangqiao station =

Beijing Subway station

Yizhuang Qiao 亦庄桥
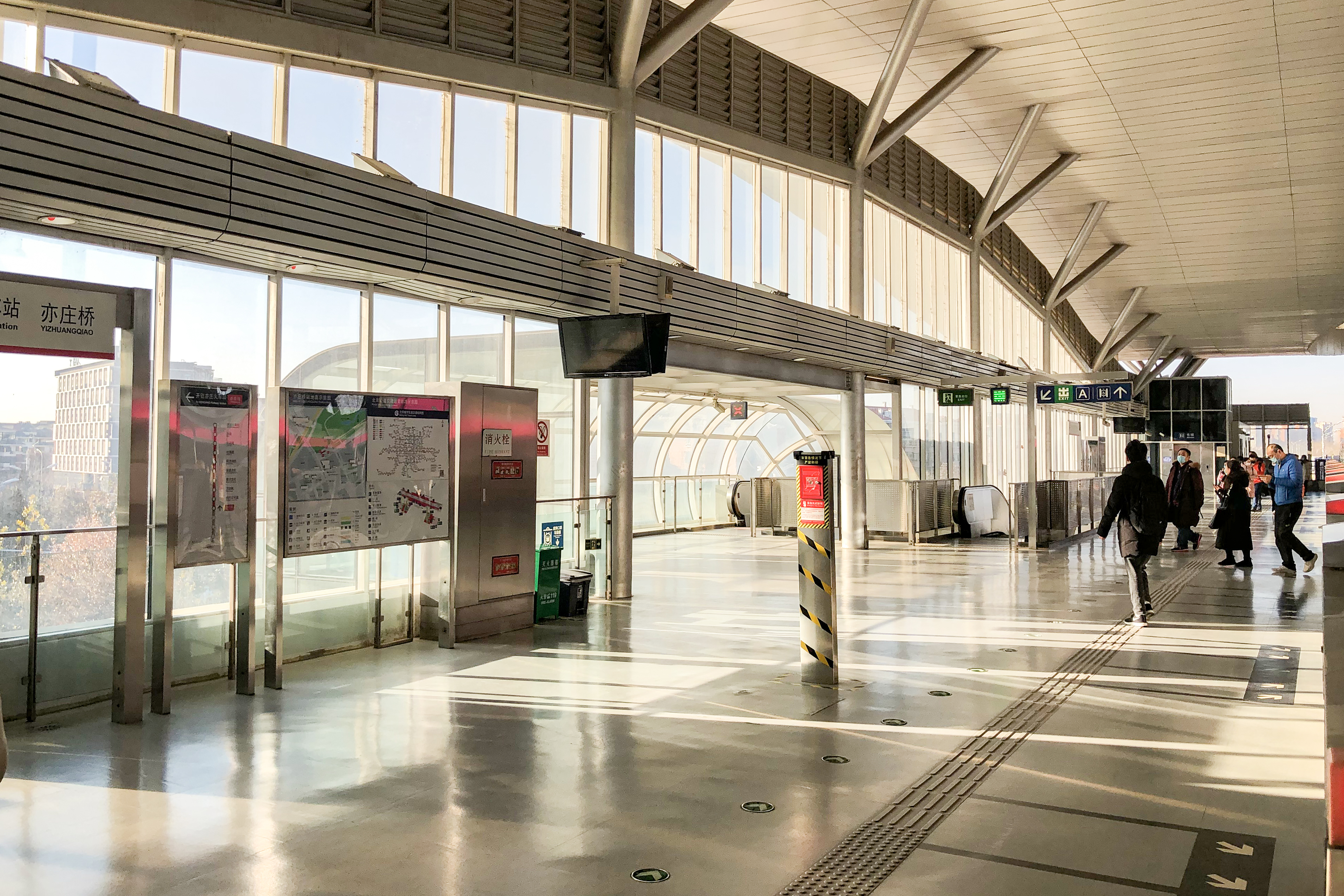
- Platform

General information
- Location: West Wenhuayuan Road (文化园西路) and North Xihuan Road (西环北路); Yizhuang, Daxing District, Beijing; China
- Coordinates: 39°48′11″N 116°28′49″E
- Operator: Beijing Mass Transit Railway Operation Corporation Limited
- Line: Yizhuang line
- Platforms: 2 (2 side platforms)
- Tracks: 2

Construction
- Structure type: Elevated
- Accessible: Yes

History
- Opened: December 30, 2010; 15 years ago

Services
Preceding station	Beijing Subway	Following station
Jiu Gong towards Songjiazhuang	Yizhuang line	Yizhuang Culture Park towards Yizhuang railway station
Location
- Location within Beijing

Yizhuang Qiao Station (simplified Chinese: 亦庄桥站; traditional Chinese: 亦莊橋站; pinyin: Yìzhuāng Qiáo Zhàn) is a Subway station on the Yizhuang Line of the Beijing Subway. It opened on December 30, 2010, together with the other stations on the line.

== Station layout ==
The station has 2 elevated side platforms.

== Exits ==
The station has 2 exits, lettered A1 and B1. Exit A1 is accessible.
