= Xiaohongmen station =

Beijing Subway station

Xiaohong Men 小红门
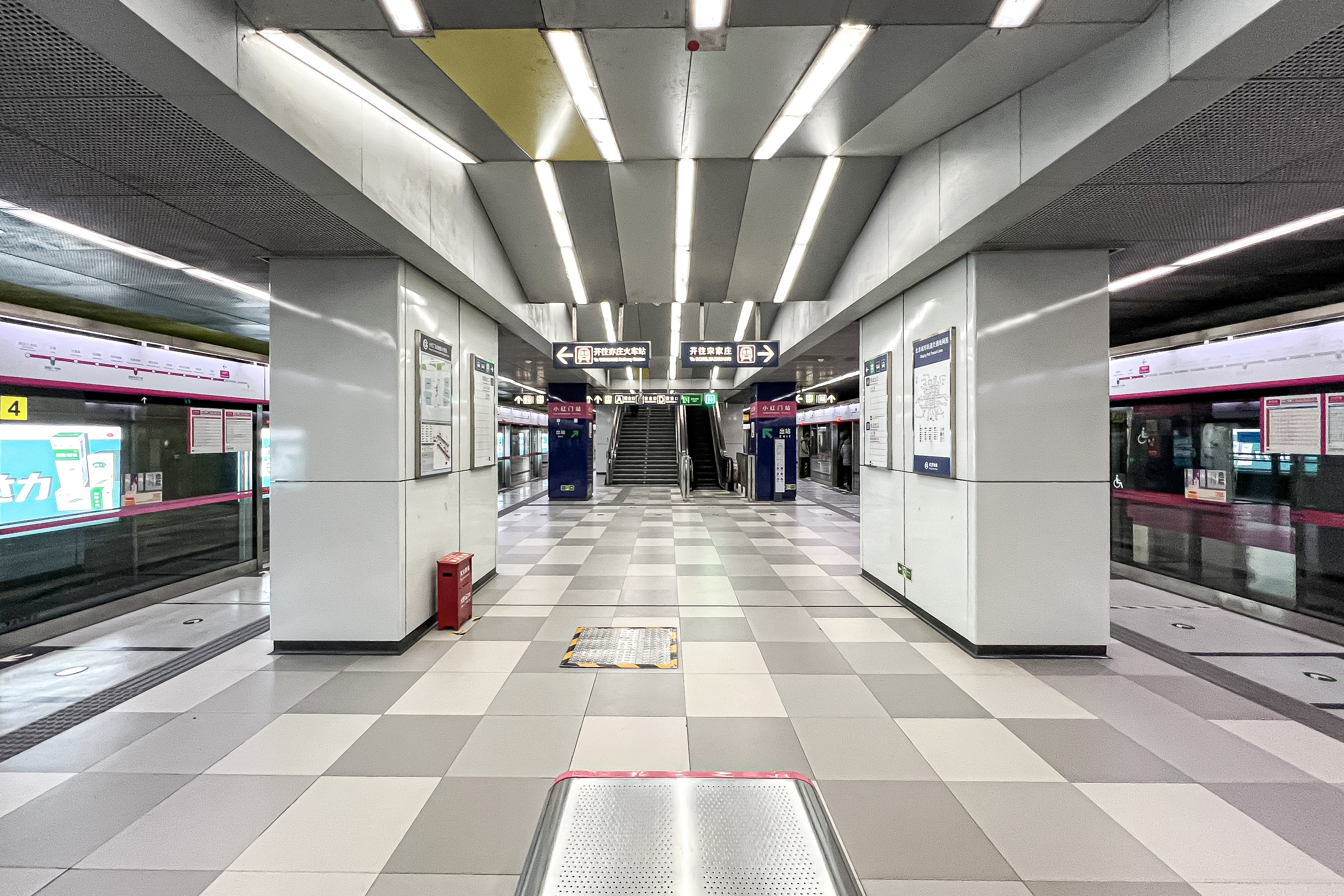
- Platform

General information
- Location: Xiaohongmen, Chaoyang District, Beijing; China
- Coordinates: 39°49′41″N 116°27′33″E
- Operator: Beijing Mass Transit Railway Operation Corporation Limited
- Line: Yizhuang line
- Platforms: 2 (1 island platform)
- Tracks: 2

Construction
- Structure type: Underground
- Accessible: Yes

History
- Opened: December 30, 2010; 15 years ago

Services
Preceding station	Beijing Subway	Following station
Xiaocun towards Songjiazhuang	Yizhuang line	Jiu Gong towards Yizhuang railway station
Location
- Location within Beijing

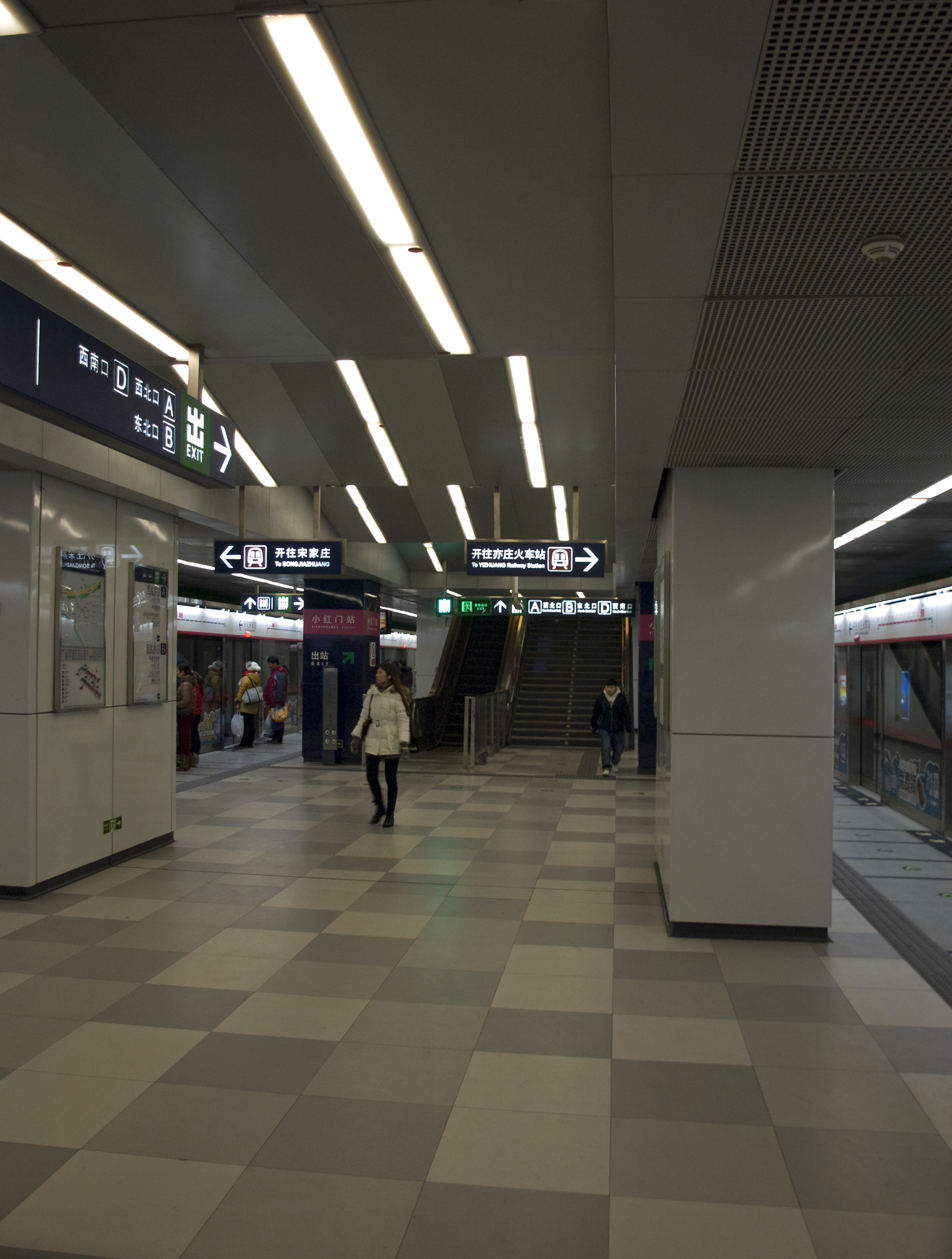
Platform

Xiaohong Men Station (simplified Chinese: 小红门站; traditional Chinese: 小紅門站; pinyin: Xiǎohóng Mén Zhàn) is a Subway station on the Yizhuang Line of the Beijing Subway.

== Station layout ==
The station has an underground island platform.

== Exits ==
There are 3 exits, lettered A, B, and D. Exit A is accessible.
