= Jiugong station =

Beijing Subway station

Jiu Gong 旧宫
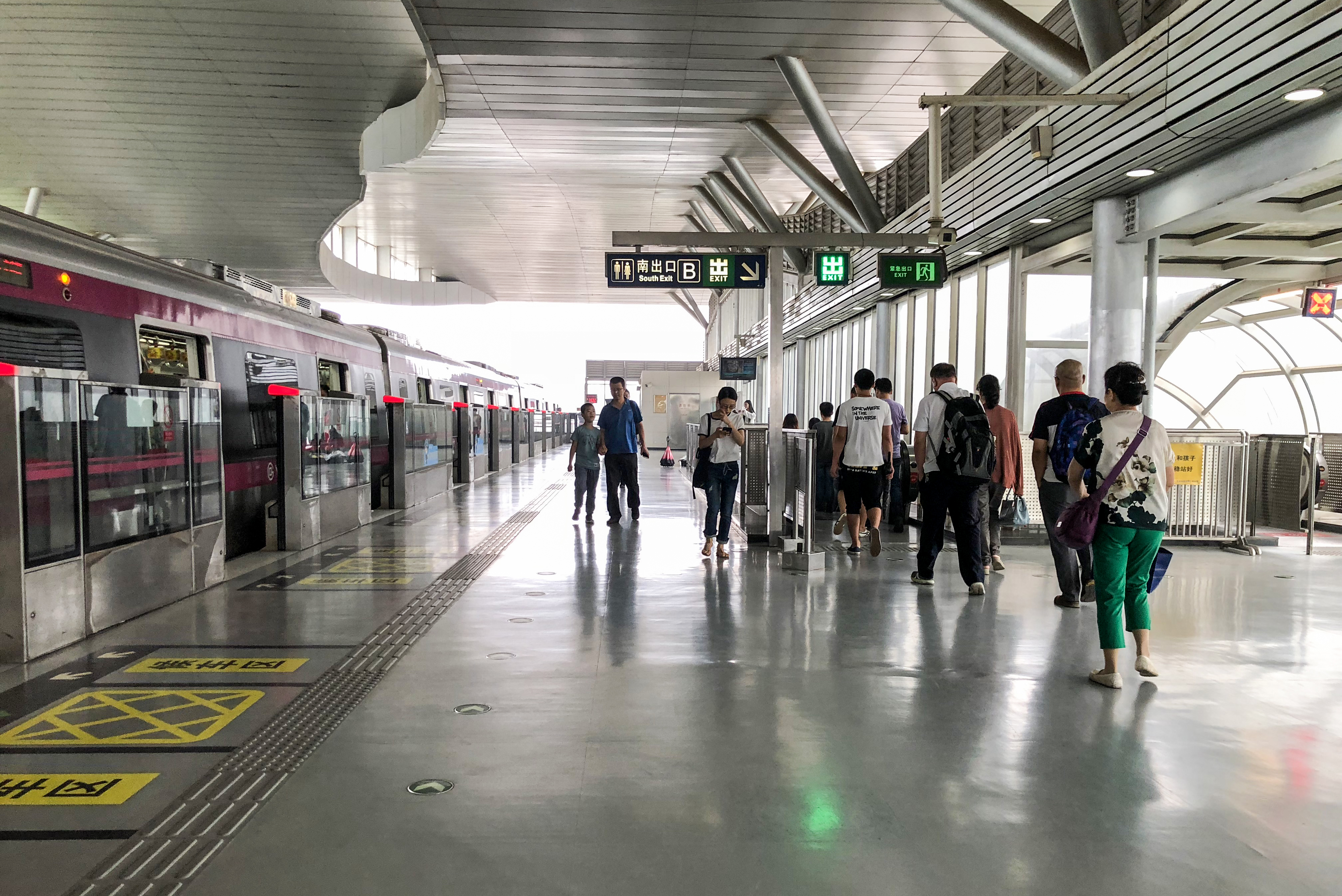
- Platform

General information
- Location: Jiugong, Daxing District, Beijing; China
- Coordinates: 39°48′26″N 116°27′39″E
- Operator: Beijing Mass Transit Railway Operation Corporation Limited
- Line: Yizhuang line
- Platforms: 2 (2 side platforms)
- Tracks: 2

Construction
- Structure type: Elevated
- Accessible: Yes

History
- Opened: December 30, 2010; 15 years ago

Services
| Preceding station | Beijing Subway | Following station |
|---|---|---|
| Xiaohongmen towards Songjiazhuang | Yizhuang line | Yizhuang Qiao towards Yizhuang railway station |
Location
- Location within Beijing

Jiu Gong Station (simplified Chinese: 旧宫站; traditional Chinese: 舊宮站; pinyin: Jiù Gōng Zhàn) is a subway station on the Yizhuang Line of the Beijing Subway.

== Station layout ==
The station has 2 elevated side platforms.

== Exits ==
There are 2 exits, lettered A1 and B1. Exit A1 is accessible.
