= Jinghai Lu station =

Beijing Subway station

Jinghai Lu 经海路
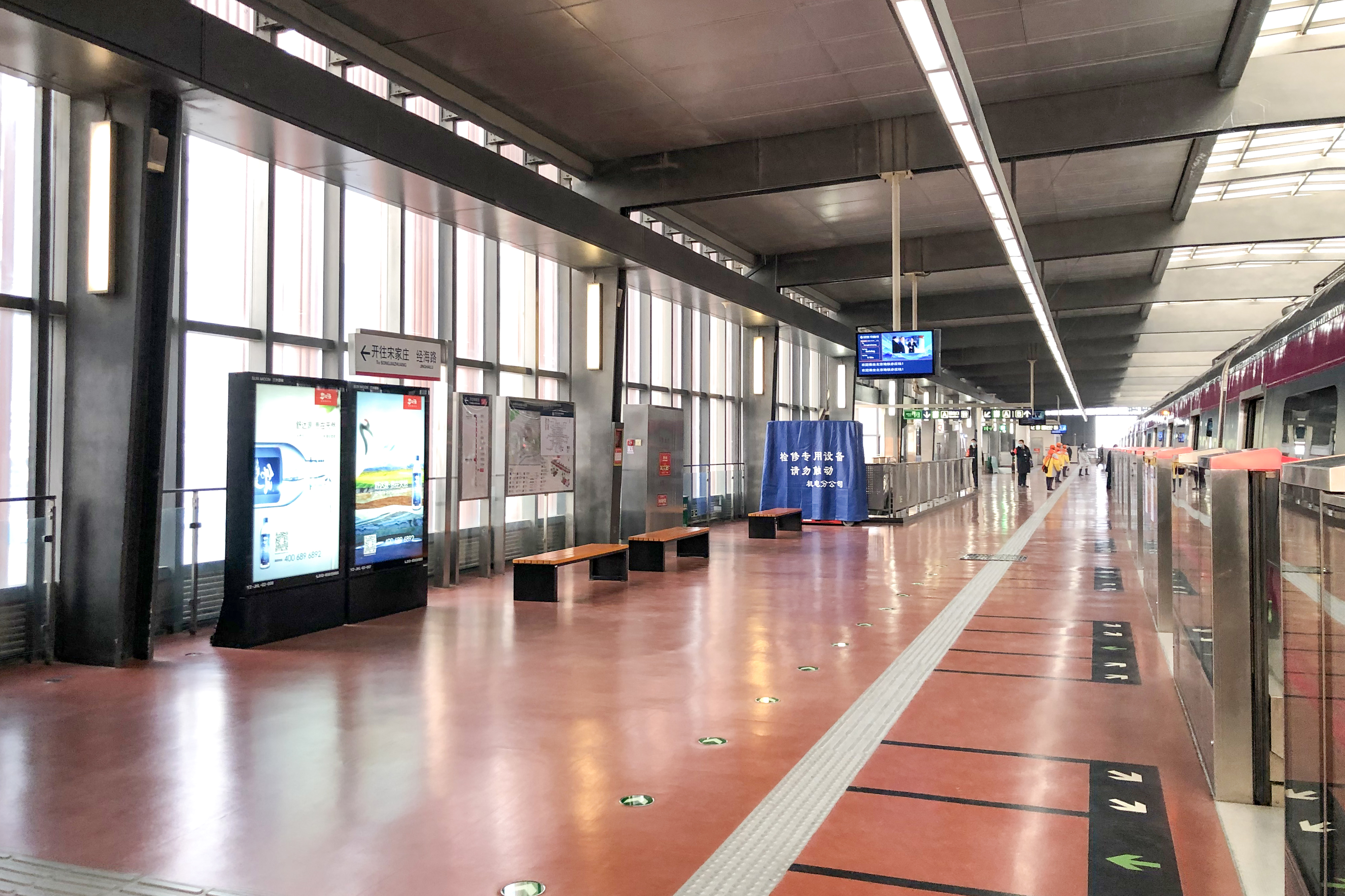
- Eastbound platform

General information
- Location: Kechuang No. 12 Street (科创十二街) and Jinghai Road; Tongzhou District, Beijing; China
- Coordinates: 39°47′01″N 116°33′44″E
- Operator: Beijing Mass Transit Railway Operation Corporation Limited
- Line: Yizhuang line
- Platforms: 2 (2 side platforms)
- Tracks: 2

Construction
- Structure type: Elevated
- Accessible: Yes

History
- Opened: December 30, 2010; 15 years ago

Services
Preceding station	Beijing Subway	Following station
Tongji Nanlu towards Songjiazhuang	Yizhuang line	Ciqunan towards Yizhuang railway station
Location
- Location within Beijing

Jinghai Lu Station (simplified Chinese: 经海路站; traditional Chinese: 經海路站; pinyin: Jīnghǎi Lù Zhàn) is a Subway station on the Yizhuang Line of the Beijing Subway. It opened on December 30, 2010, together with the other stations on the line.

== Station layout ==
The station has 2 elevated side platforms.

== Exits ==
There are 2 exits, lettered A1 and B1. Exit A1 is accessible.
