= Xiaocun station =

Beijing Subway station

Xiaocun 肖村
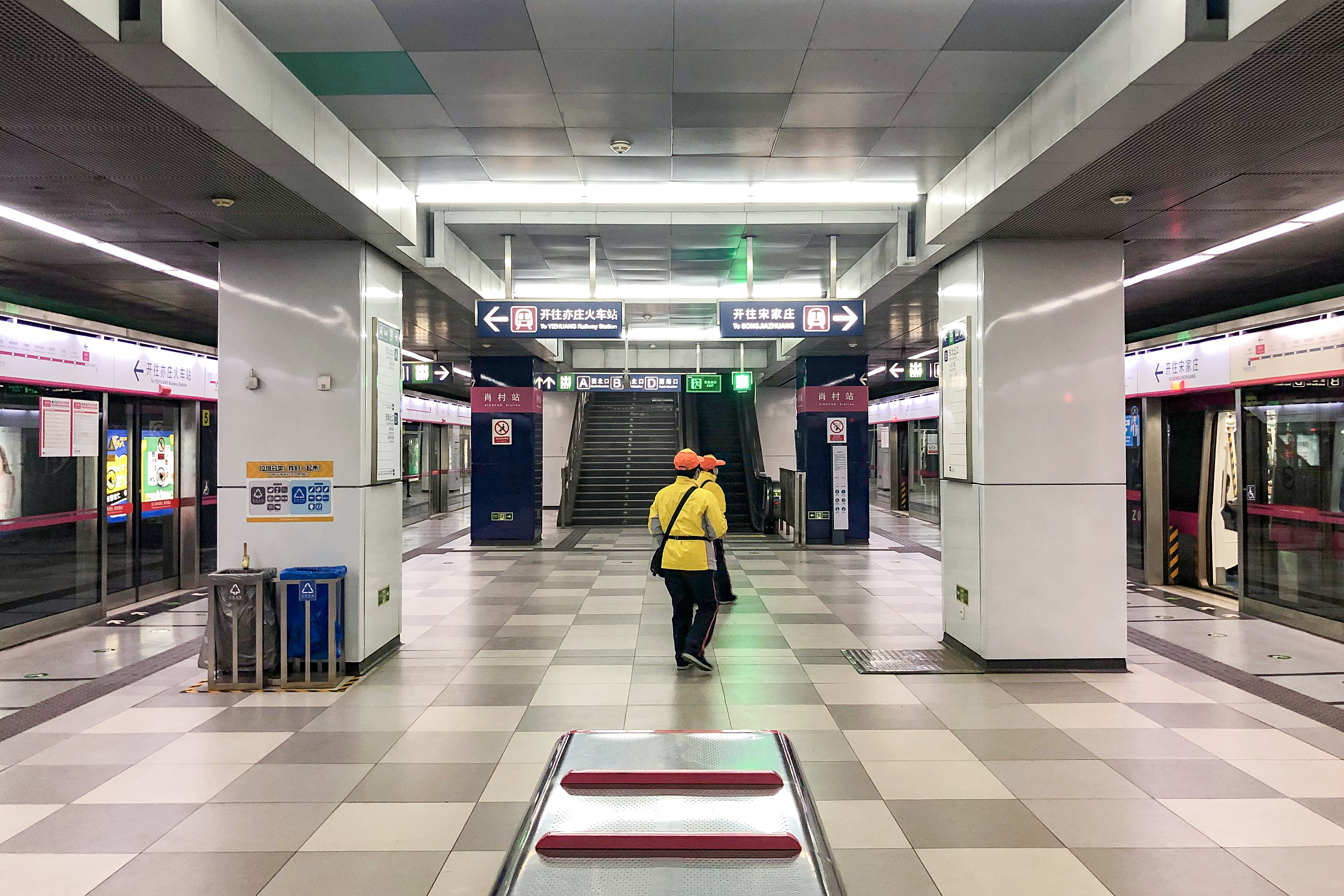
- Platform

General information
- Location: Songzhuang Road (宋庄路) and Shiliuzhuang Road (石榴庄路); Xiaohongmen, Chaoyang District, Beijing; China
- Coordinates: 39°50′03″N 116°26′54″E
- Operator: Beijing Mass Transit Railway Operation Corporation Limited
- Line: Yizhuang line
- Platforms: 2 (1 island platform)
- Tracks: 2

Construction
- Structure type: Underground
- Accessible: Yes

History
- Opened: December 30, 2010; 15 years ago

Services
Preceding station	Beijing Subway	Following station
Songjiazhuang Terminus	Yizhuang line	Xiaohong Men towards Yizhuang railway station
Location
- Location within Beijing

Xiaocun Station (Chinese: 肖村站; pinyin: Xiāocūn Zhàn) is a Subway station on the Yizhuang Line of the Beijing Subway, China.

== Station layout ==
The station has an underground island platform.

== Exits ==
There are 3 exits, lettered A, B, and D. Exit A is accessible.
