= Jinhai Road station =

Jinhai Road station may refer to:

- Jinhai Road station (Shanghai Metro), a station on the Shanghai Metro in Pudong, Shanghai
- Jinhai Road station (Ningbo Rail Transit), a station on the Ningbo Rail Transit in Fenghua, Ningbo, Zhejiang

== See also ==
- Jinghai Lu station
