= Shiliuzhuang station =

Beijing Subway station

Shiliuzhuang 石榴庄
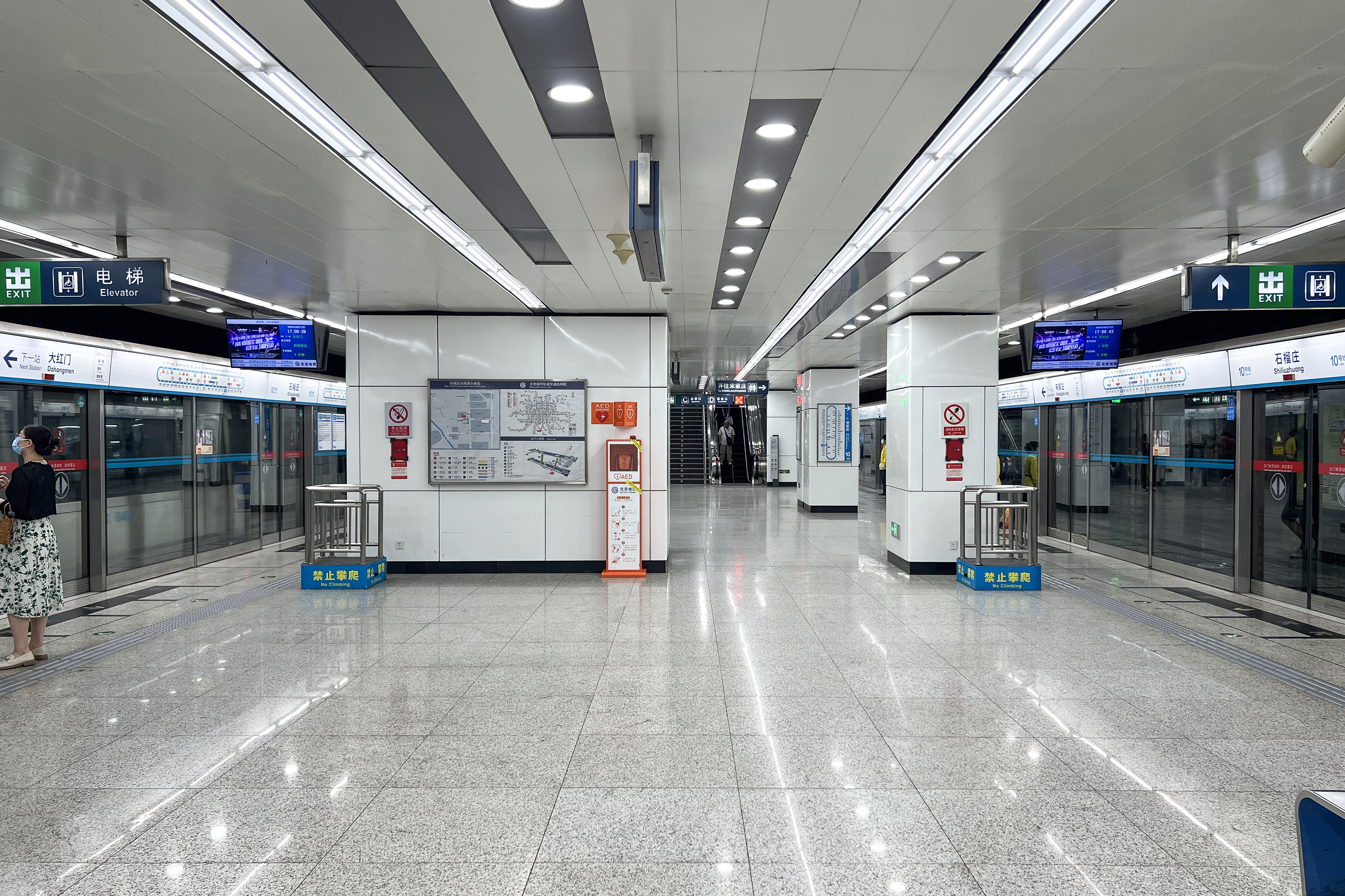
- Platform

General information
- Location: Shiliuzhuang Road (石榴庄路) and Guangcai Road (光彩路); Fengtai District, Beijing; China
- Coordinates: 39.8459°N 116.4141°E
- Operator: Beijing Mass Transit Railway Operation Corporation Limited
- Line: Line 10
- Platforms: 2 (1 island platform)
- Tracks: 2

Construction
- Structure type: Underground
- Accessible: Yes

History
- Opened: December 30, 2012; 13 years ago

Services
Preceding station	Beijing Subway	Following station
Songjiazhuang outer loop / anticlockwise	Line 10	Dahong Men inner loop / clockwise
Location
- Location within Beijing

Shiliuzhuang station (simplified Chinese: 石榴庄站; traditional Chinese: 石榴莊站; pinyin: Shíliuzhuāng zhàn) is a station on Line 10 of the Beijing Subway. This station opened on December 30, 2012.

== Station layout ==
The station has an underground island platform.

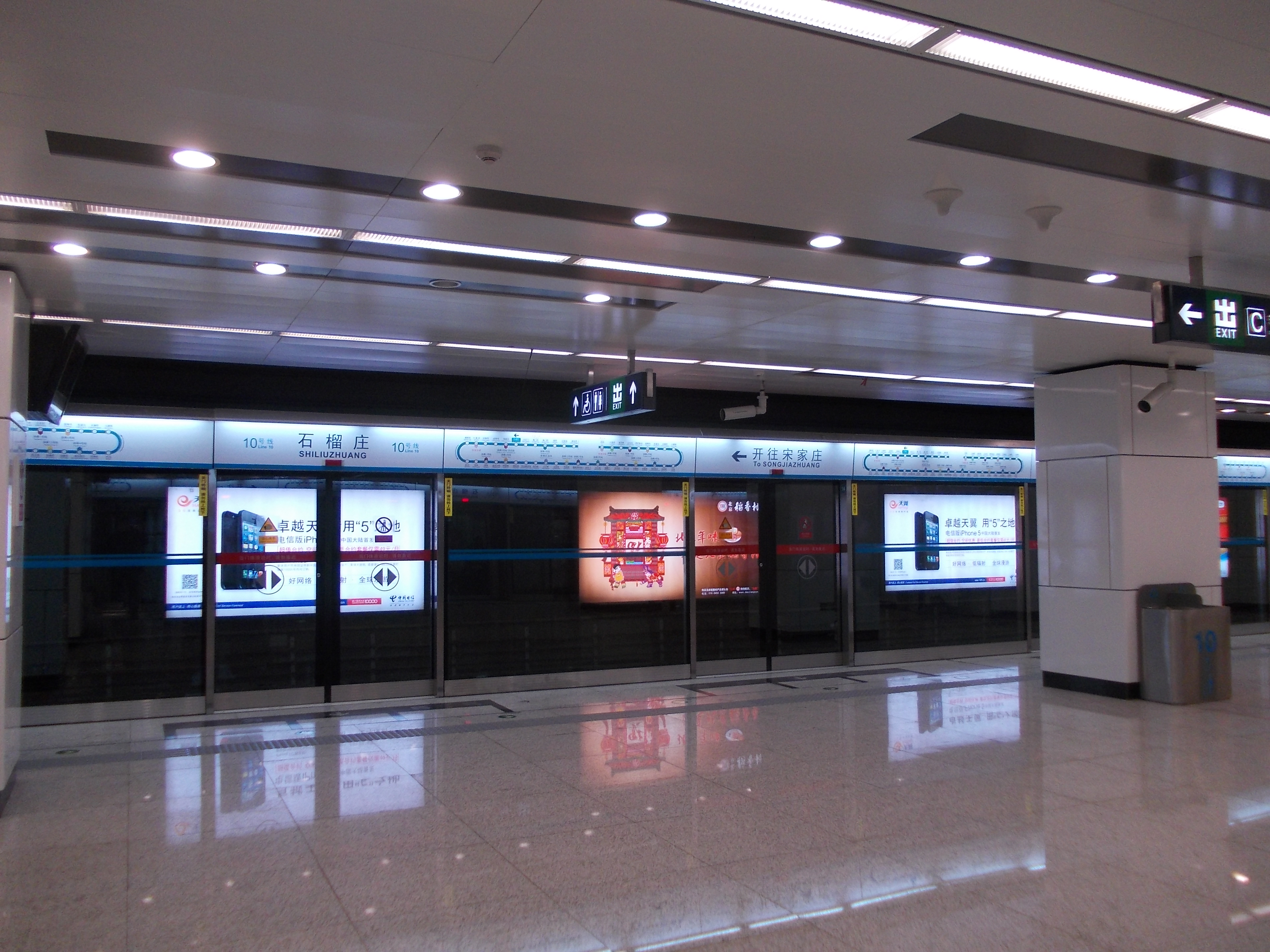
Platform

== Exits ==
There are 2 exits, lettered C and D. Exit C is accessible.
