= Liujiayao station =

Beijing Subway station

Coordinates: 39.8575°N 116.4221°E

Liujiayao 刘家窑
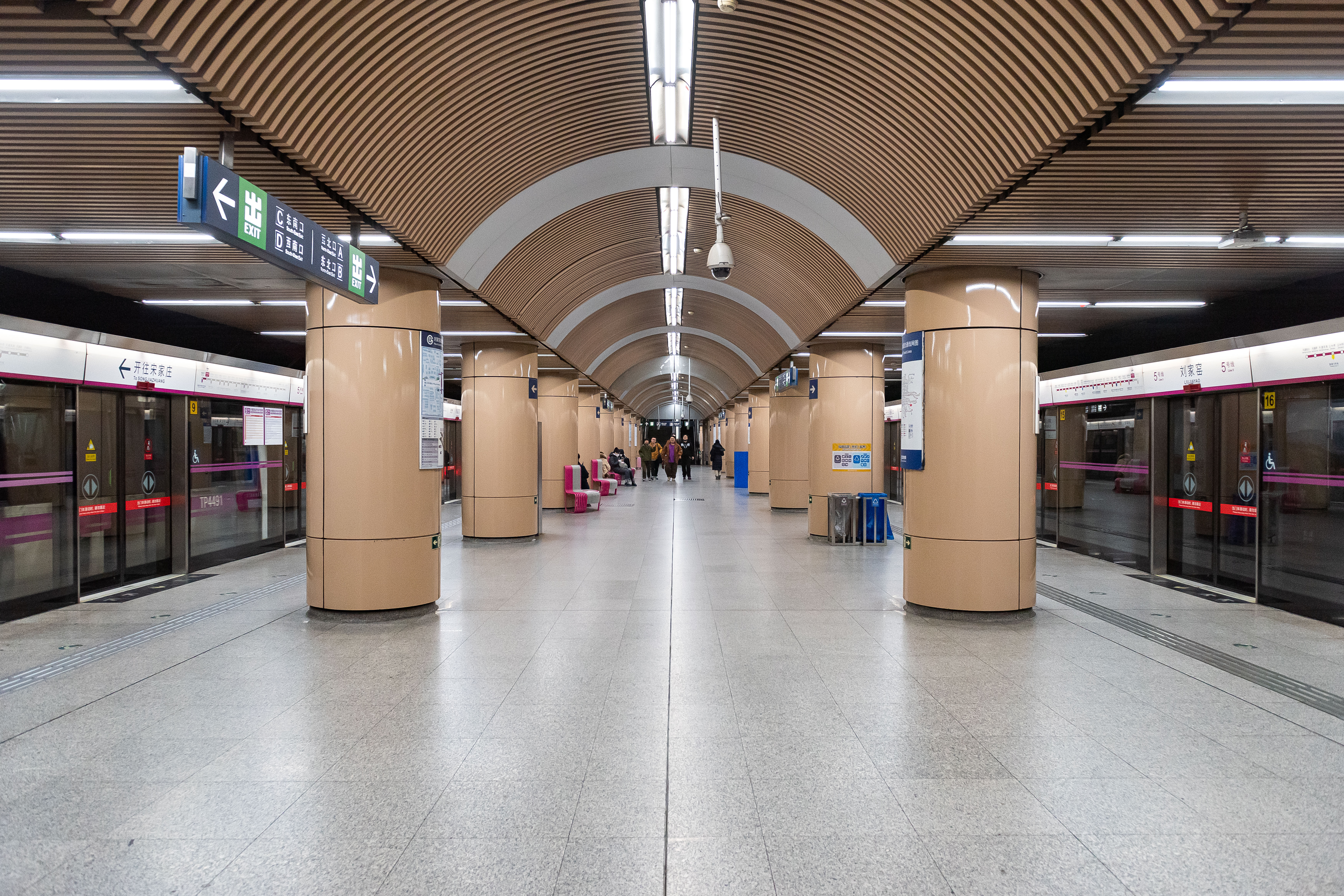
- Platform

General information
- Location: South 3rd Ring Road Middle at Liujiayao Bridge; Fengtai District, Beijing; China
- Operator: Beijing Mass Transit Railway Operation Corporation Limited
- Line: Line 5
- Platforms: 2 (1 island platform)
- Tracks: 2

Construction
- Structure type: Underground
- Accessible: Yes

History
- Opened: October 7, 2007

Services
Preceding station	Beijing Subway	Following station
Puhuangyu towards Tiantongyuanbei	Line 5	Songjiazhuang Terminus
Location
- Location within Beijing

Liujiayao Station (simplified Chinese: 刘家窑站; traditional Chinese: 劉家窯站; pinyin: Liújiāyáo Zhàn) is a station on Line 5 of the Beijing Subway.

== Station layout ==
The station has an underground island platform.

== Exits ==
There are 4 exits, lettered A, B, C, and D. Exits A and C are accessible.
