= Yizhuang T1 line =

Tram line of the Beijing Subway system

Yizhuang T1 Line

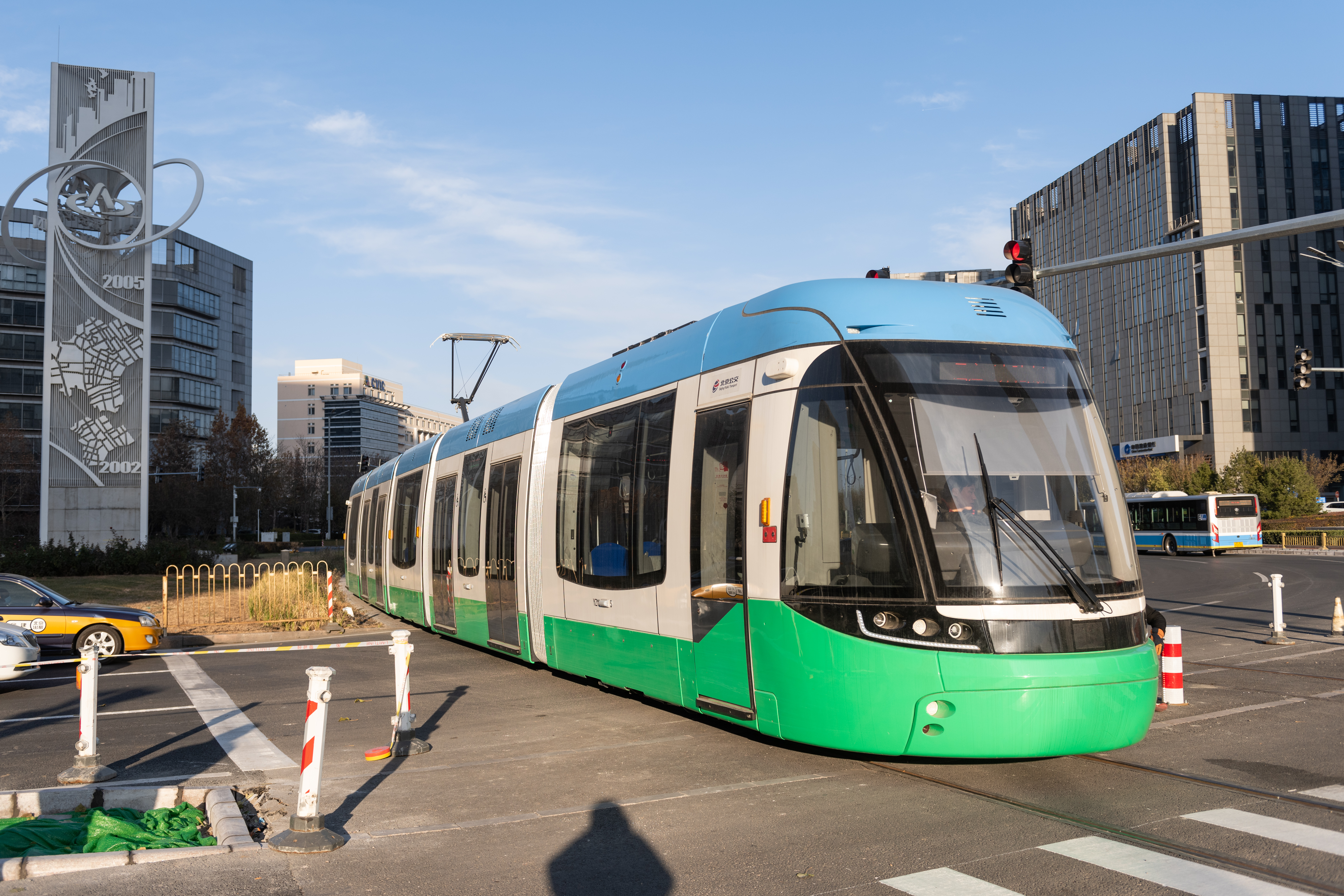

Overview
- Other name: Line T1 of Yizhuang New Town Modern Tram
- Status: In operation
- Locale: Daxing and Tongzhou Districts; Beijing
- Termini: Qu Zhuang; Dinghai Yuan
- Stations: 15 (14 in operation)

Service
- Type: Tram
- System: Beijing Subway
- Rolling stock: Low-floor trams built by Beijing Subway Rolling Stock Equipment Co., Ltd.

History
- Opened: December 31, 2020; 5 years ago

Technical
- Line length: 11.9 km (7.4 mi) (in operation); 13.255 km (8.2 mi)
- Track gauge: 1,435 mm (4 ft 8 1/2 in)

Yizhuang T1 Line is a 13.255 km (8.2 mi) tram line with 15 stations. It is part of the Beijing Subway system. It runs from Qu Zhuang station in Daxing District to Dinghai Yuan station in Tongzhou District. The line opened on December 31, 2020. Construction of Laoguan Li station has been shelved.

== Stations (Southwest to Northeast) ==
Station Name		Connections	Nearby Bus Stops	Distance km		Location
English	Chinese	Connections	Nearby Bus Stops	Distance km		Location
Laoguan Li (Note: Construction shelved)	老观里					Daxing
Qu Zhuang	屈庄			0.000	0.000	Daxing
Rongxing Jie	融兴街			0.801	0.801	Daxing
Ruihe Zhuang	瑞合庄			0.802	1.603	Daxing
Taiheqiaobei	太和桥北		兴50 专231	1.375	2.978	Daxing
Sihai Zhuang	四海庄		兴31 兴47 兴50	0.638	3.616	Daxing
Jiuhao Cun	九号村		581 兴50 专183	0.993	4.609	Daxing
Taihe Lu	泰河路		专90	0.606	5.215	Daxing
Lujuandong	鹿圈东		453 492 578 580 665 685 913 兴16 兴38 兴47 兴48 兴49 兴50 兴56 专183	0.739	5.954	Daxing
Yizhuang Tongren	亦庄同仁		453 492 578 665 685 826 913 T31 兴16 兴38 兴47 兴48 兴49 兴50 兴56 兴76 兴78 专183	1.228	7.182	Daxing
Rongchang Dongjie	荣昌东街	Yizhuang	324 453 542 578 580 665 826 846 913 快速直达专线1 快速直达专线120 快速直达专线188 T31 T63 兴16 兴32 兴38 兴43 兴47 兴48 兴49 兴50 兴51 兴56 兴58 兴76 兴78 专41 专181 专183 专184 专185 专187 专188	0.604	7.786	Daxing
Beijing Etrong Int'l Exhibition & Convention Center	亦创会展中心		324 453 578 快速直达专线1 T31 T66 兴16 兴32 兴38 兴43 兴47 兴51 兴56 兴58 兴76 专41 专181 专183 专184 专187 专188	0.608	8.394	Daxing
Jinghai Yilu	经海一路			1.368	9.762	Tongzhou
Dinghaiyuanxi	定海园西		专184	1.257	11.019	Tongzhou
Dinghai Yuan	定海园		913 986 T11 T12 T56 专159 专184 专232	0.880	11.899	Tongzhou

== History ==
Segment	Commencement	Length	Station(s)	Name
Quzhuang — Dinghaiyuan	31 December 2020	11.9 km (7.4 mi)	14	Initial Section

== Future Development ==
A branch line of Yizhuang T1 line is planned for the future.
