= Yizhuang line =

Rapid transit line in Beijing

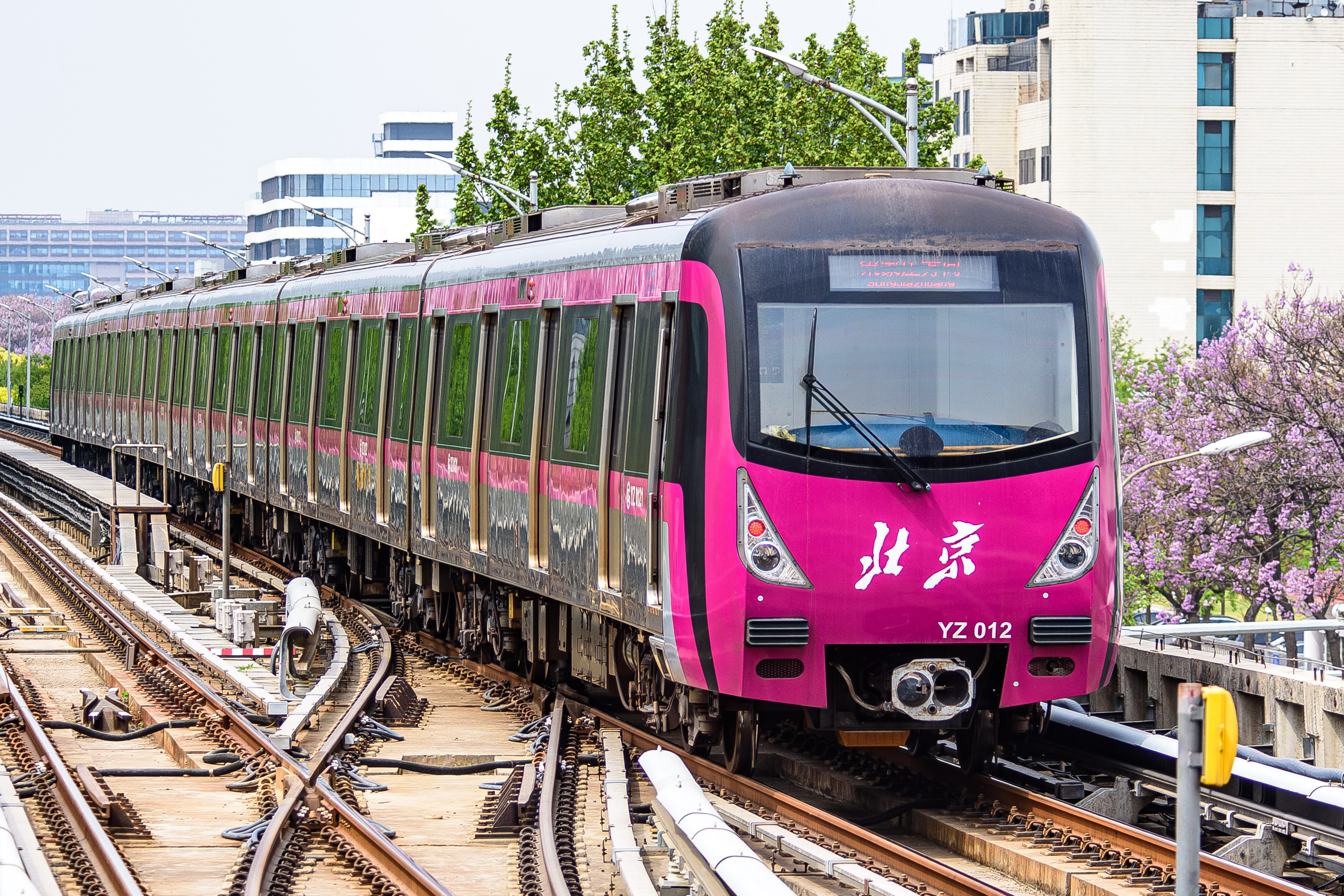
- A Yizhuang line train at Rongjing Dongjie station

Overview
- Other name: M24/L2 (planned name)
- Native name: 亦庄线
- Status: Operational
- Locale: Tongzhou, Daxing, Chaoyang, and Fengtai districts Beijing
- Termini: Songjiazhuang; Yizhuang railway station
- Stations: 14

Service
- Type: Rapid transit
- System: Beijing Subway
- Operator: Beijing Mass Transit Railway Operation Corporation Limited
- Depot(s): Songjiazhuang, Taihu
- Rolling stock: 6-car Type B (DKZ32)
- Daily ridership: 173,500 (2014 Avg.); 221,200 (2014 Peak)

History
- Opened: 30 December 2010; 15 years ago

Technical
- Line length: 23.23 km (14.43 mi)
- Character: Underground and elevated
- Track gauge: 1,435 mm (4 ft 8 1/2 in)
- Electrification: 750 V DC third rail
- Operating speed: 80 km/h (50 mph) (maximum service speed)

The Yizhuang Line (simplified Chinese: 亦庄线; traditional Chinese: 亦莊線; pinyin: Yìzhuāng Xiàn) is a rapid transit line of the Beijing Subway that connects the Yizhuang Development Area with Beijing's subway network. The line is 23.23 km (14.43 mi) long with 14 stations, including six underground and eight elevated. It runs from Songjiazhuang in Fengtai District to Yizhuang Railway Station in Tongzhou District and passes through the southern Chaoyang and northern Daxing Districts. Total investment for the line was estimated at ¥1.2 billion. Construction began on December 8, 2007 and the line opened on December 30, 2010. Yizhuang line's color is magenta.

== List of stations ==
Station Name		Connections	Nearby Bus Stops	Distance km		Location
English	Chinese	Connections	Nearby Bus Stops	Distance km		Location
Songjiazhuang	宋家庄	5 10	2 39 84 139 141 366 511 524 526 555 576 581 990 快速直达专线116 快速直达专线211 夜28 专62	0.000	0.000	Fengtai
Xiaocun	肖村		25 93 128 400 400快 602 665 680 820 821 985 990 快速直达专线182 夜23 专196	2.631	2.631	Chaoyang
Xiaohong Men	小红门		352 985 快速直达专线31 专196	1.275	3.906	Chaoyang
Jiu Gong	旧宫		599 685 825 926 997 兴15 兴42 兴72 兴73 兴75 兴76 专25	2.366	6.272	Daxing
Yizhuang Qiao	亦庄桥		492 599 665 685 821 846 927 997 快速直达专线120 快速直达专线188 兴15 兴42 兴72 兴76	1.982	8.254	Daxing
Yizhuang Culture Park	亦庄文化园		专181	0.993	9.247	Daxing
Wanyuan Jie	万源街		324 492 821 927 975 976 快速直达专线120 T66 兴15	1.728	10.975	Daxing
Rongjing Dongjie	荣京东街		492 523 665 846 快速直达专线120 快速直达专线188 兴15 兴76 兴78 专185	1.090	12.065	Daxing
Rongchang Dongjie	荣昌东街	Yizhuang T1	324 453 542 578 580 665 826 846 913 快速直达专线1 快速直达专线120 快速直达专线188 T31 T63 兴16 兴32 兴38 兴43 兴47 兴48 兴49 兴50 兴51 兴56 兴58 兴76 兴78 专41 专181 专183 专184 专185 专187 专188	1.355	13.420	Daxing
Tongji Nanlu	同济南路		542 821 846 927 975 976 913 快速直达专线166 T12 T28 T54 T63 T66 T67 T69 兴32 兴43 兴51 兴58 专41 专184 专188	2.337	15.757	Tongzhou
Jinghai Lu	经海路		523 快速直达专线44 快速直达专线166 T28 T29 T56 T68 T68区 T87 专47 专159 专182 专184 专188 专232	2.301	18.058	Tongzhou
Ciqunan	次渠南		专207	2.055	20.113	Tongzhou
Ciqu	次渠	17	637 820 986 T11 T27 T56 T87 专159 专207	1.281	21.394	Tongzhou
Yizhuang railway station	亦庄火车站		913 T110 专232	1.334	22.728	Tongzhou

== History ==
Segment	Commencement	Length	Station(s)	Name
Songjiazhuang — Ciqu	30 December 2010	21.4 km (13.30 mi)	13	(initial phase)
Ciqu — Yizhuang Railway Station	30 December 2018	1.334 km (0.83 mi)	1	one-station extension

== Accidents and incidents ==
On March 26, 2015, train YZ021 was testing when it derailed around Taihu. No passengers were on board and the driver faced leg injuries.

== Future development ==
On 8 July 2022, an EIA document regarding Phase III construction of Beijing rail transport system (2022–2027) announced to reform the connection tracks between Yizhuang line, the line 5 and the line 10, so that trains of Yizhuang line can operate through trains with lines 5 and 10. It will require a maximum of 1.1 km (0.68 mi) new tracks near Songjiazhuang train depot, between Songjiazhuang stations of Yizhuang line and line 5, and Chengshousi station of line 10, it will also require to rebuild 0.5 km tracks for train storages within Songjiazhuang depot.

== Rolling Stock ==
Model	Image	Manufacturer	Year built	Amount in service	Fleet numbers	Depot
DKZ32		CRRC Changchun Railway Vehicles	2010	23	YZ 001–YZ 023	Songjiazhuang; Taihu
CED5001		Beijing CRRC Changke Erqi	2023	4	YZ 024–YZ 027	Songjiazhuang; Taihu
