= Songjiazhuang station =

Beijing Subway interchange station

Songjiazhuang 宋家庄
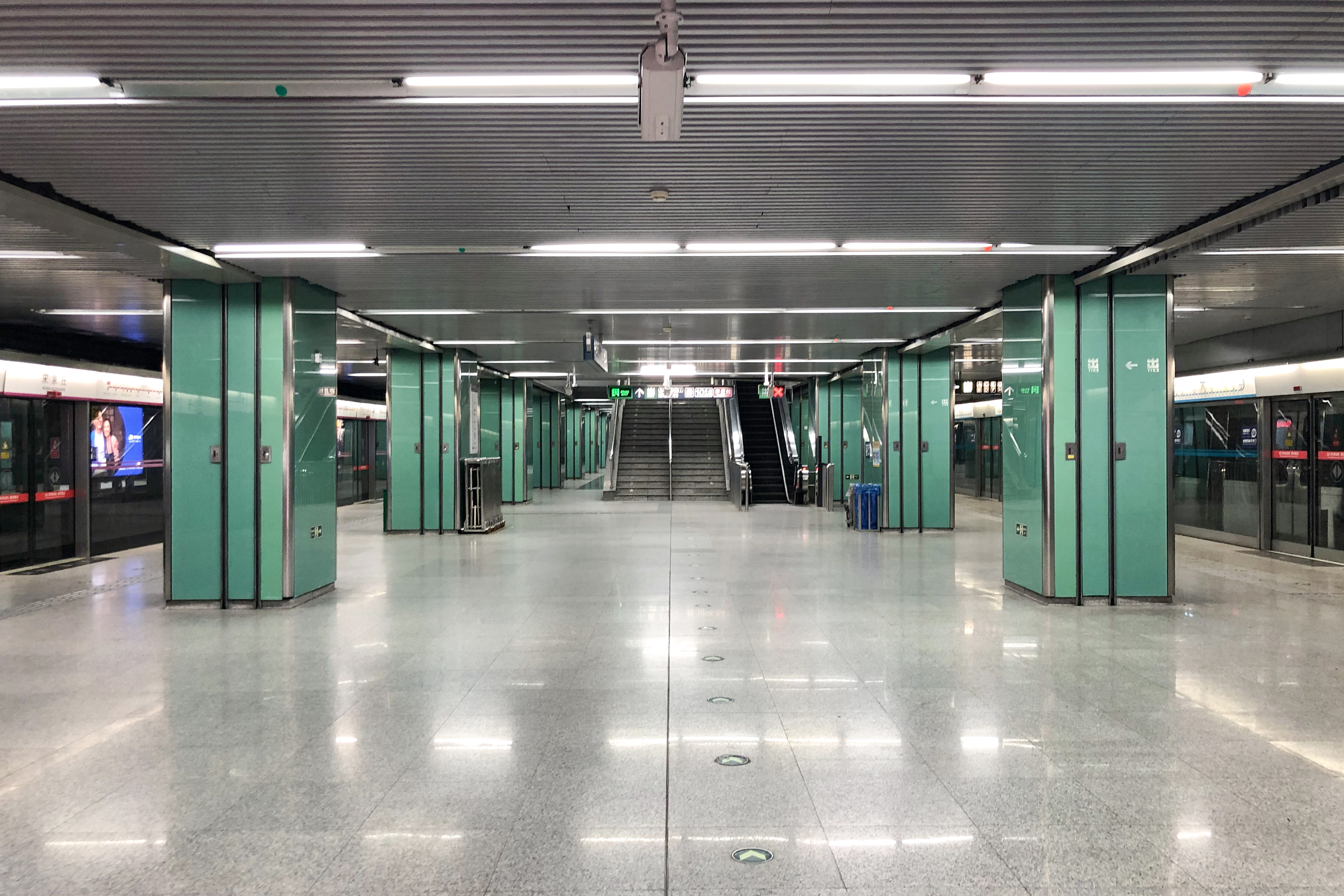
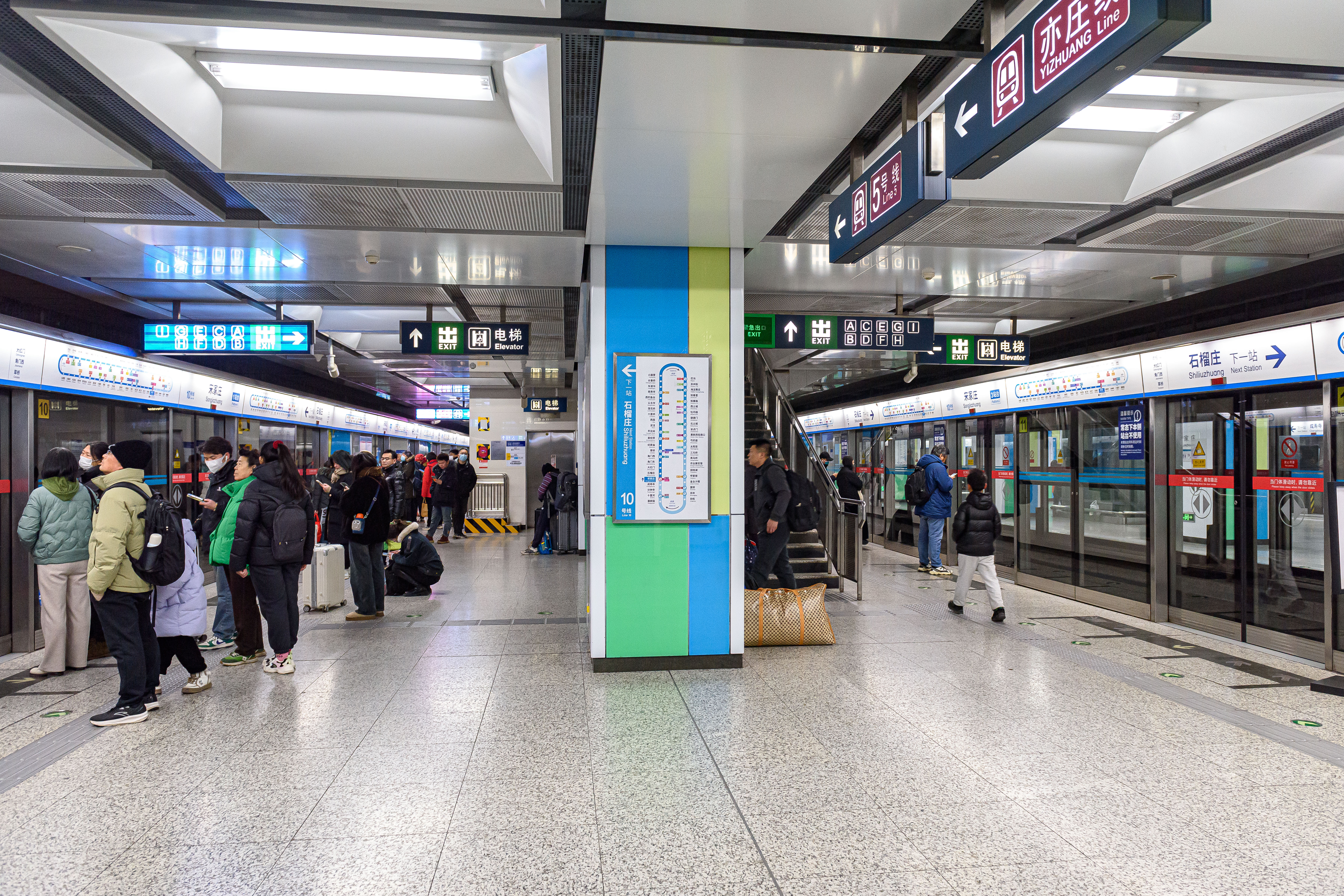
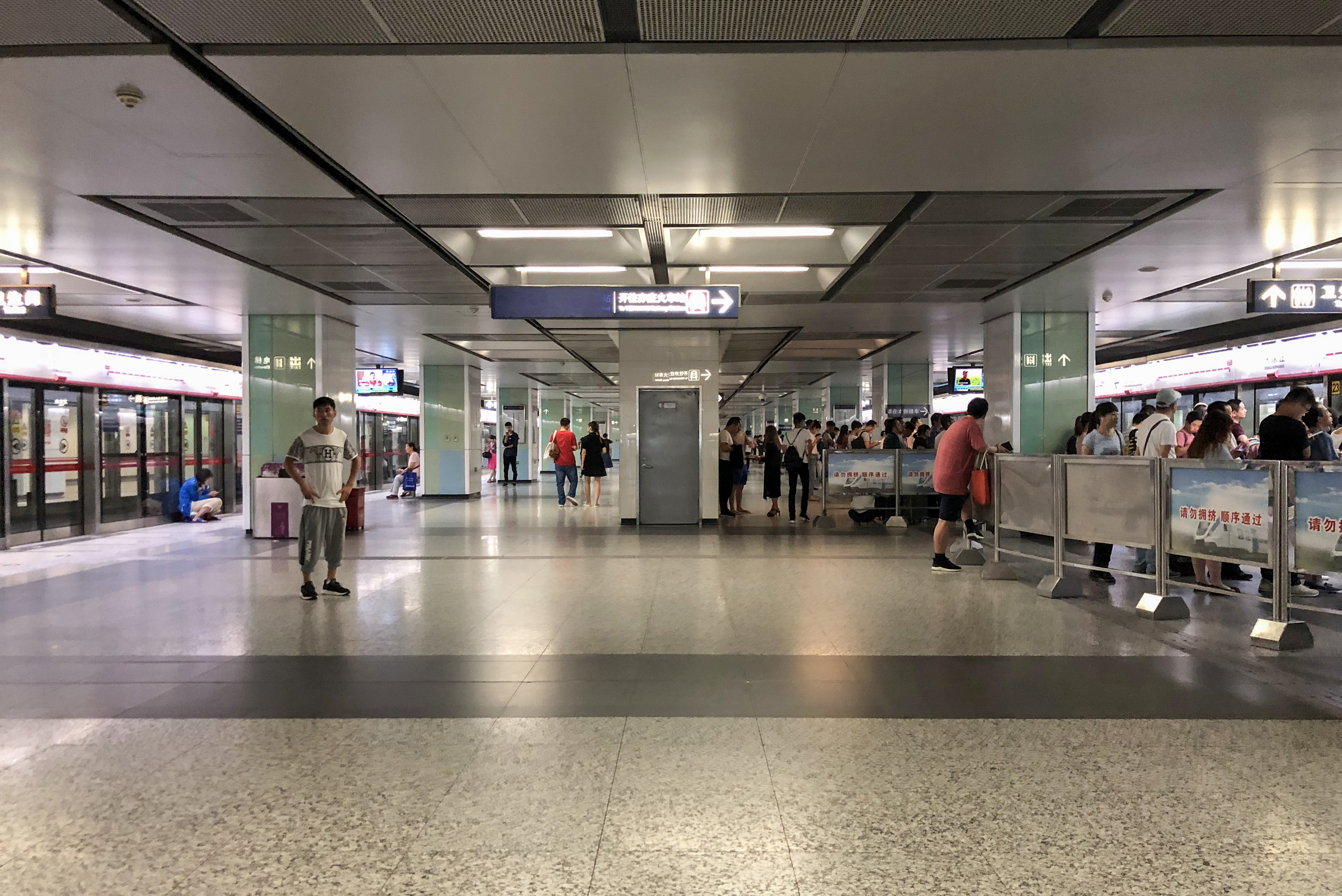
- Line 5 boarding platform Line 10 clockwise platform Yizhuang line boarding platform

General information
- Location: Songzhuang Road (宋庄路) and Shiliuzhuang Road (石榴庄路); Dongtiejiangying Subdistrict, Fengtai District, Beijing; China
- Coordinates: 39.845849°N 116.428368°E
- Operator: Beijing Mass Transit Railway Operation Corporation Limited
- Lines: Line 5; Line 10; Yizhuang line
- Platforms: 10 (4 island platforms and 3 side platforms)
- Tracks: 7

Construction
- Structure type: Underground
- Accessible: Yes

History
- Opened: October 7, 2007; 18 years ago (Line 5); December 30, 2012; 13 years ago (Line 10); December 30, 2010; 15 years ago (Yizhuang line)

Services
Preceding station	Beijing Subway	Following station
Liujiayao towards Tiantongyuanbei	Line 5	Terminus
Chengshou Si outer loop / anticlockwise	Line 10	Shiliuzhuang inner loop / clockwise
Terminus	Yizhuang line	Xiaocun towards Yizhuang railway station
Location
- Location within Beijing

Songjiazhuang Station (simplified Chinese: 宋家庄站; traditional Chinese: 宋家莊站; pinyin: Sòngjiāzhuāng Zhàn) is a station on Line 5, Line 10, and the Yizhuang Line of the Beijing Subway. This is an interchange station and terminus for Line 5 and Yizhuang Line. The station handled a peak passenger traffic of 262,800 people on May 5, 2013.

On December 30, 2012, Phase 2 Section 1 of Line 10 opened, passing through Songjiazhuang Station, making Songjiazhuang Station the 3rd 3-way transfer station of Beijing Subway (The first two being Xizhimen Station and Dongzhimen Station).

== Station layout ==
The entire station is underground. Line 5 has 2 side platforms. Line 10 has dual-island platforms with a single track between the 2 platforms. The Yizhuang Line has three platforms, employing the spanish solution; the departing passengers use the middle platform, whereas the arriving passengers disembark to the side platforms. The Line 5 alighting platform and the Yizhuang Line boarding platform in the middle connect perpendicularly in a T-shape, allowing single-direction cross-platform interchange from Line 5 to Yizhuang Line; this is the first instance of cross-platform transfer in Beijing Subway.

With 10 platforms and 7 tracks, the station places first on the amount of platforms and second (to Xingong station) on the amount of tracks throughout the entire Beijing Subway.

== Exits ==
There are 9 exits, lettered A, B, C, D, E, F, G, H, and I. Exit G is accessible.

== Gallery ==
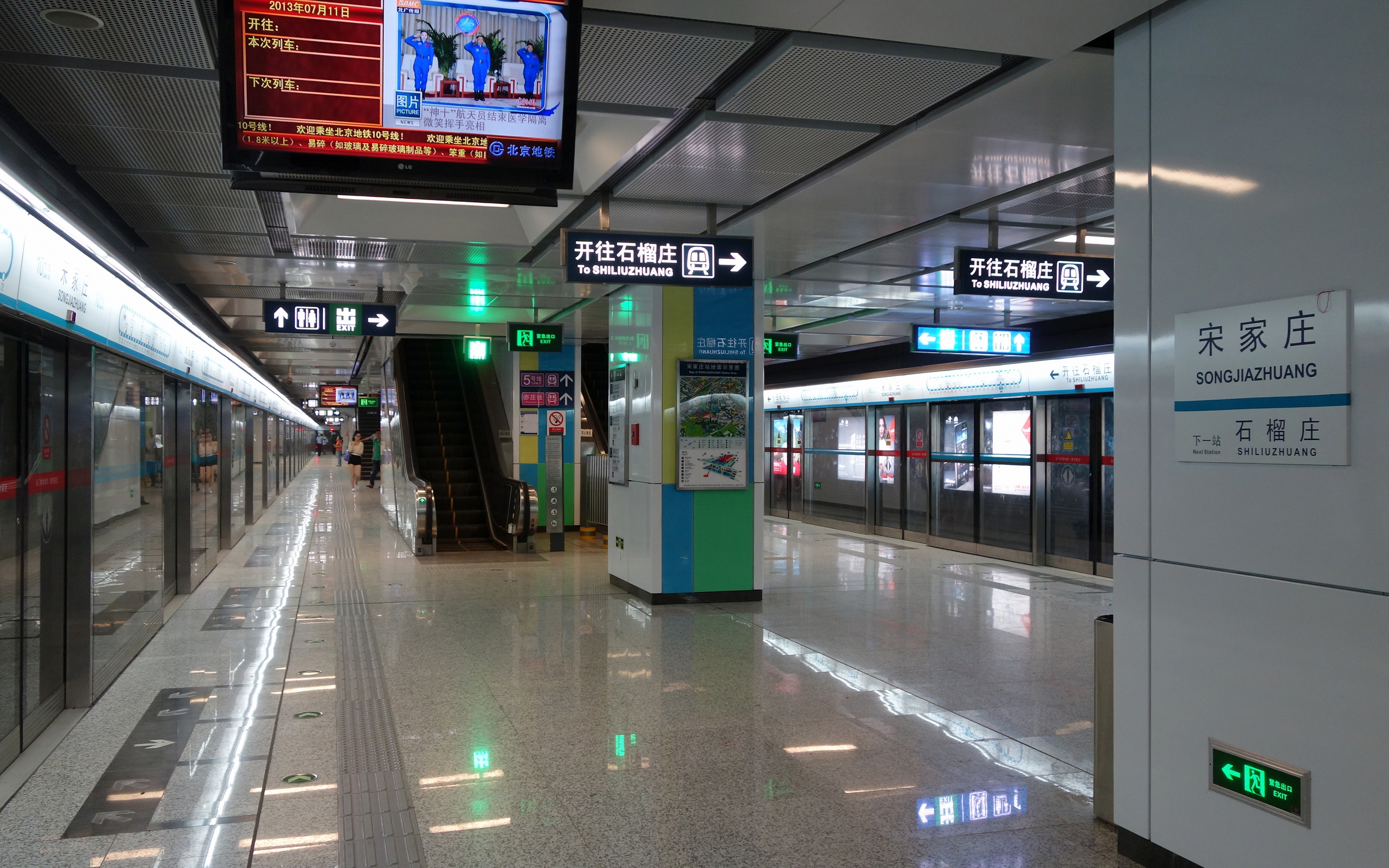
Line 10 platform (July 2013)

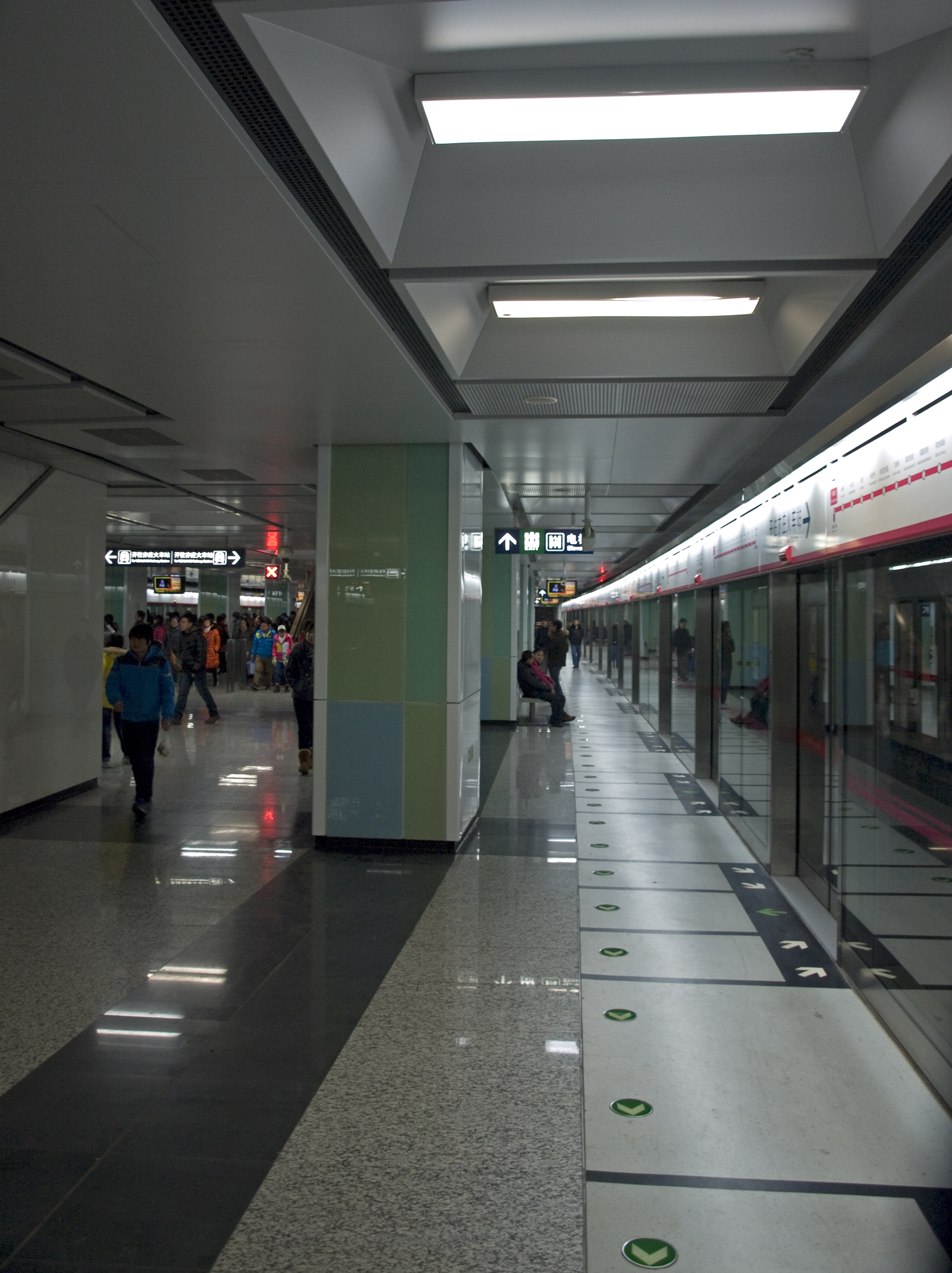
Yizhuang line platform

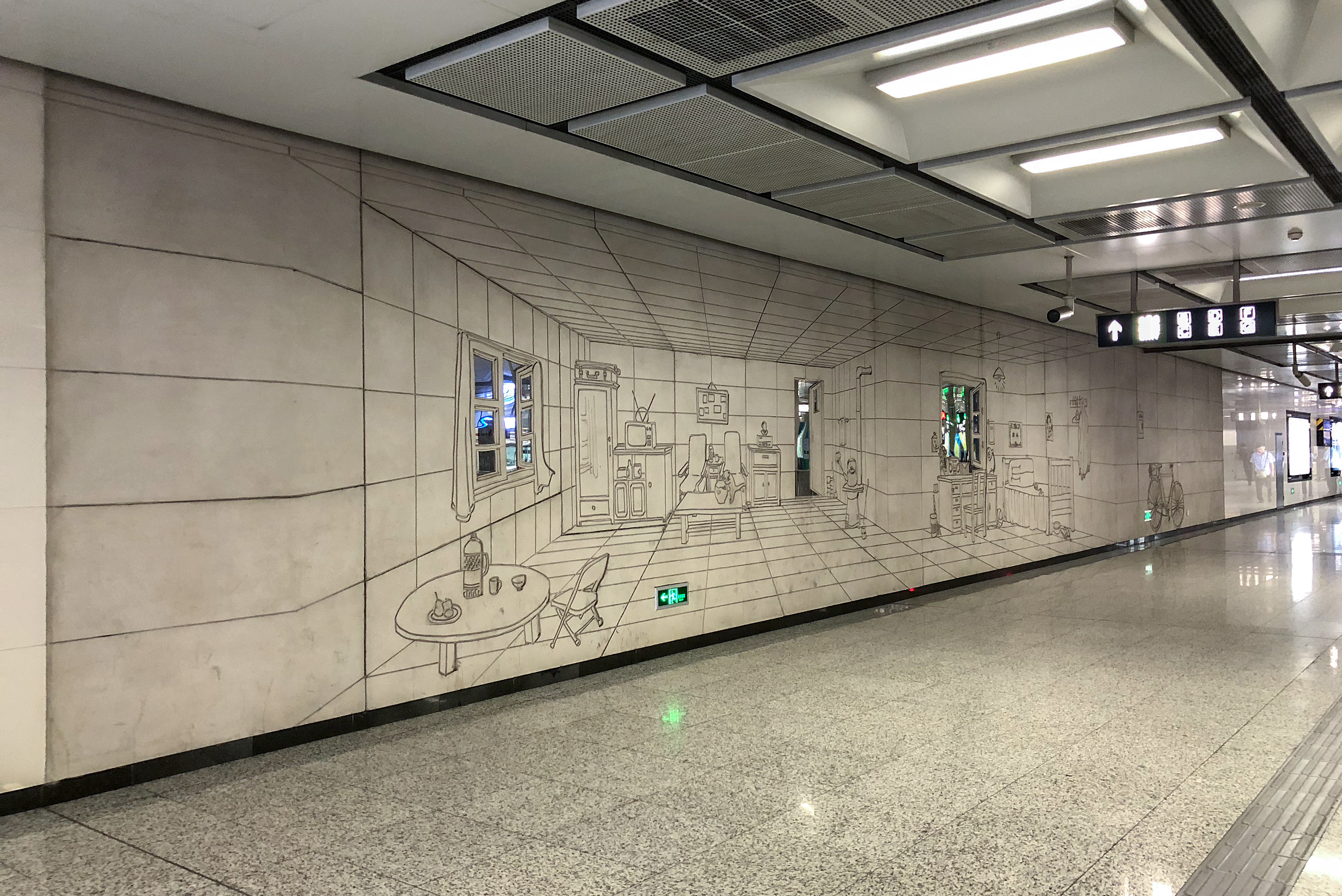
Residence mural

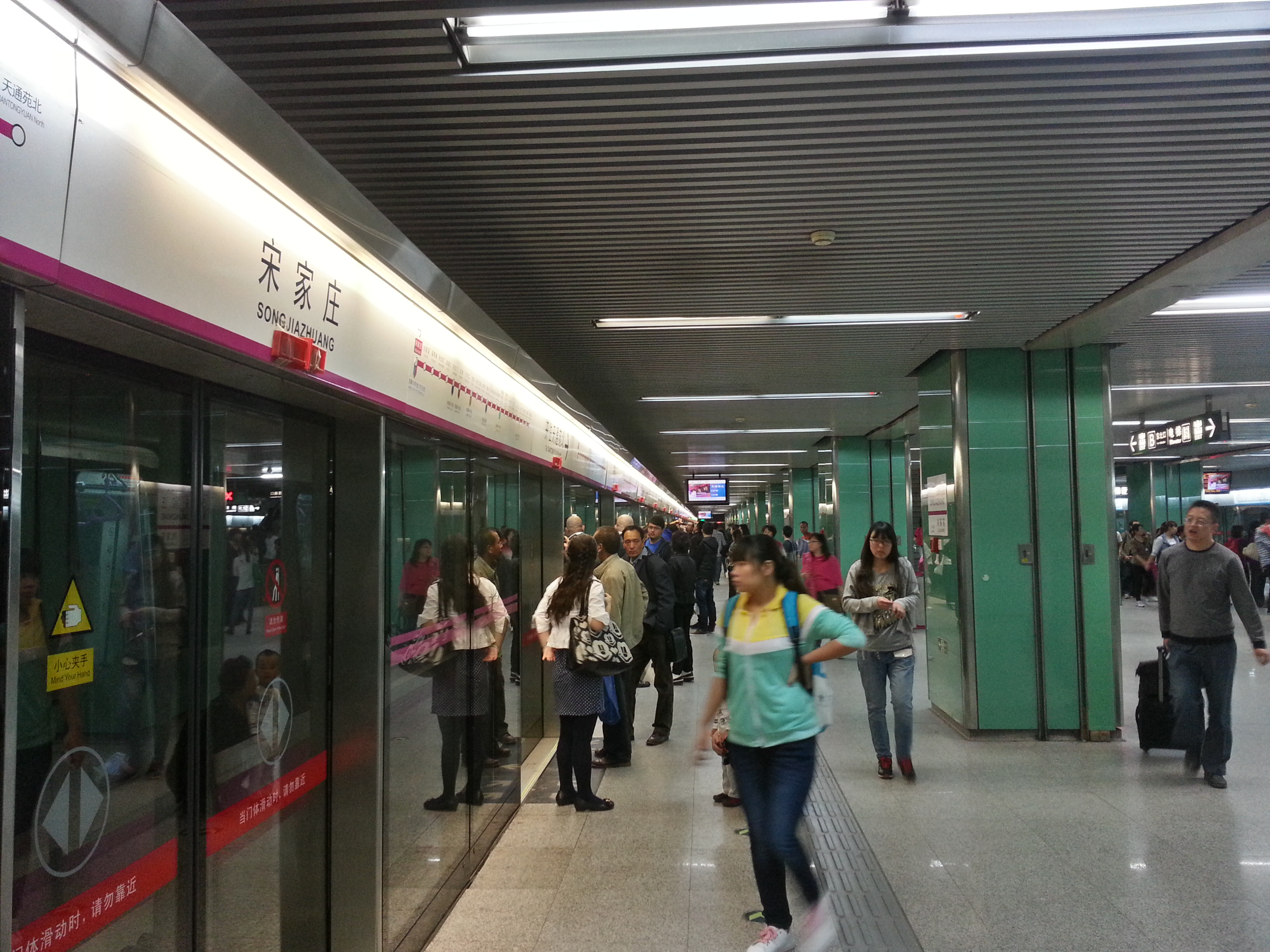
Line 5 platform

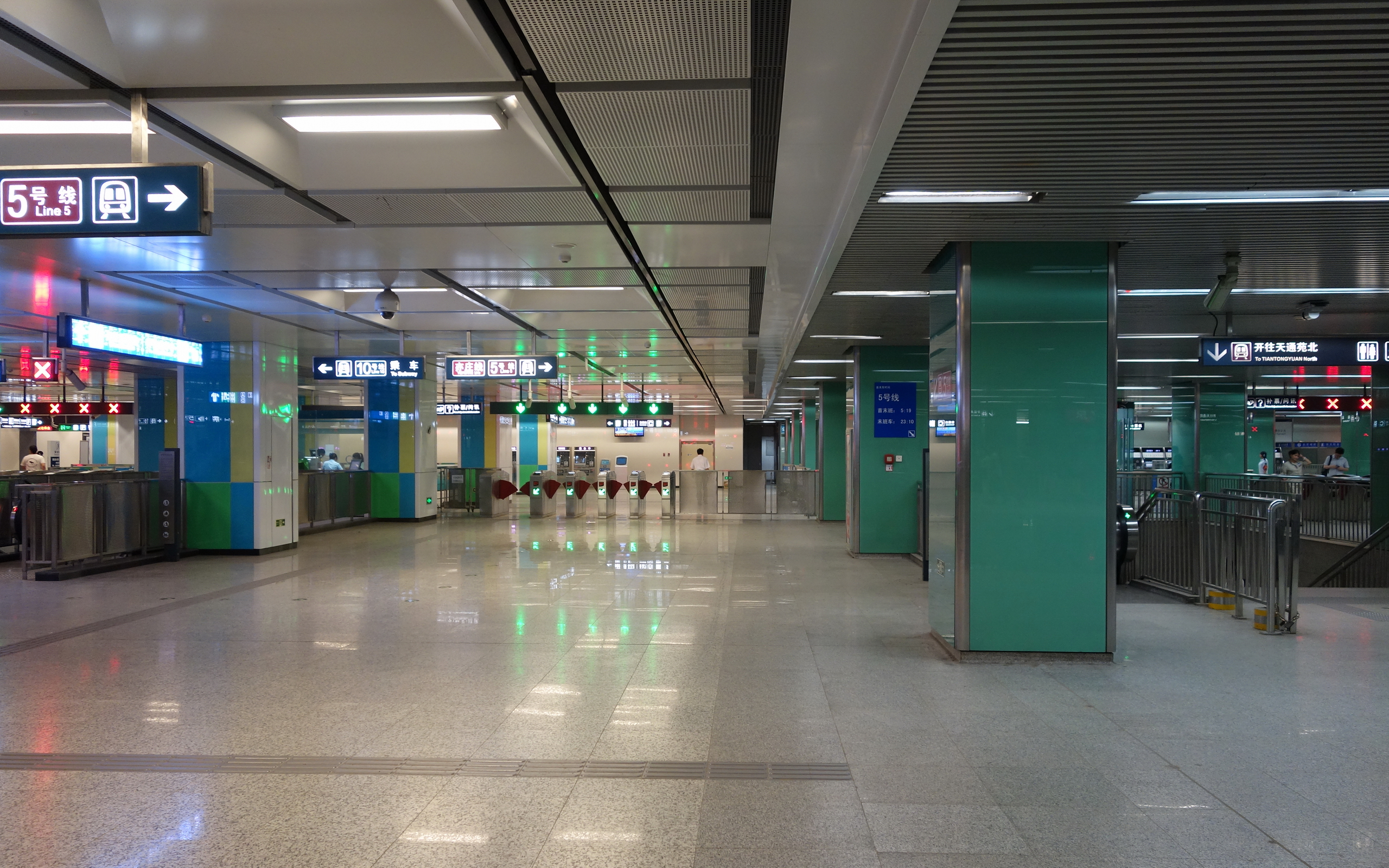
Concourse (July 2013)

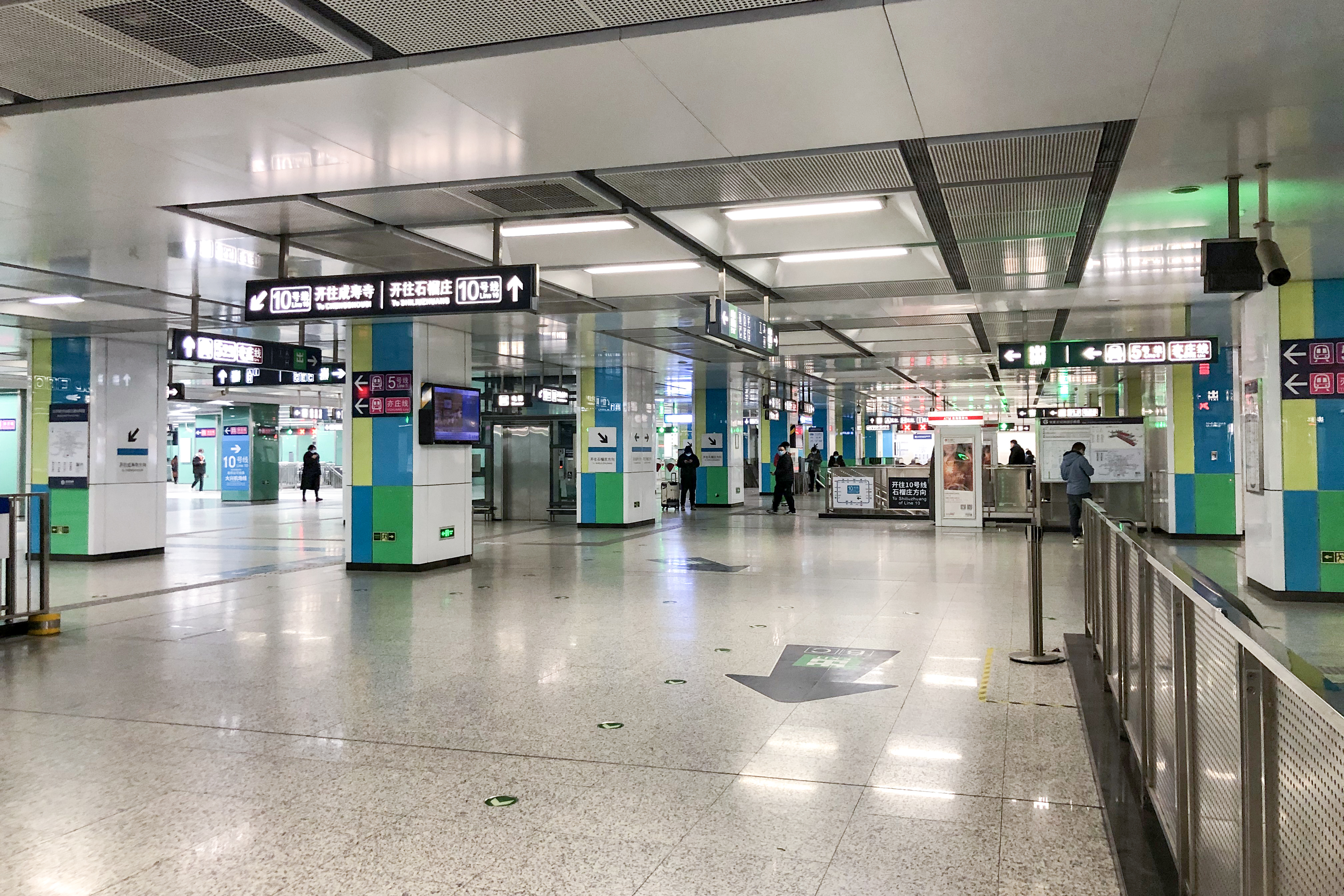
Concourse (February 2021)

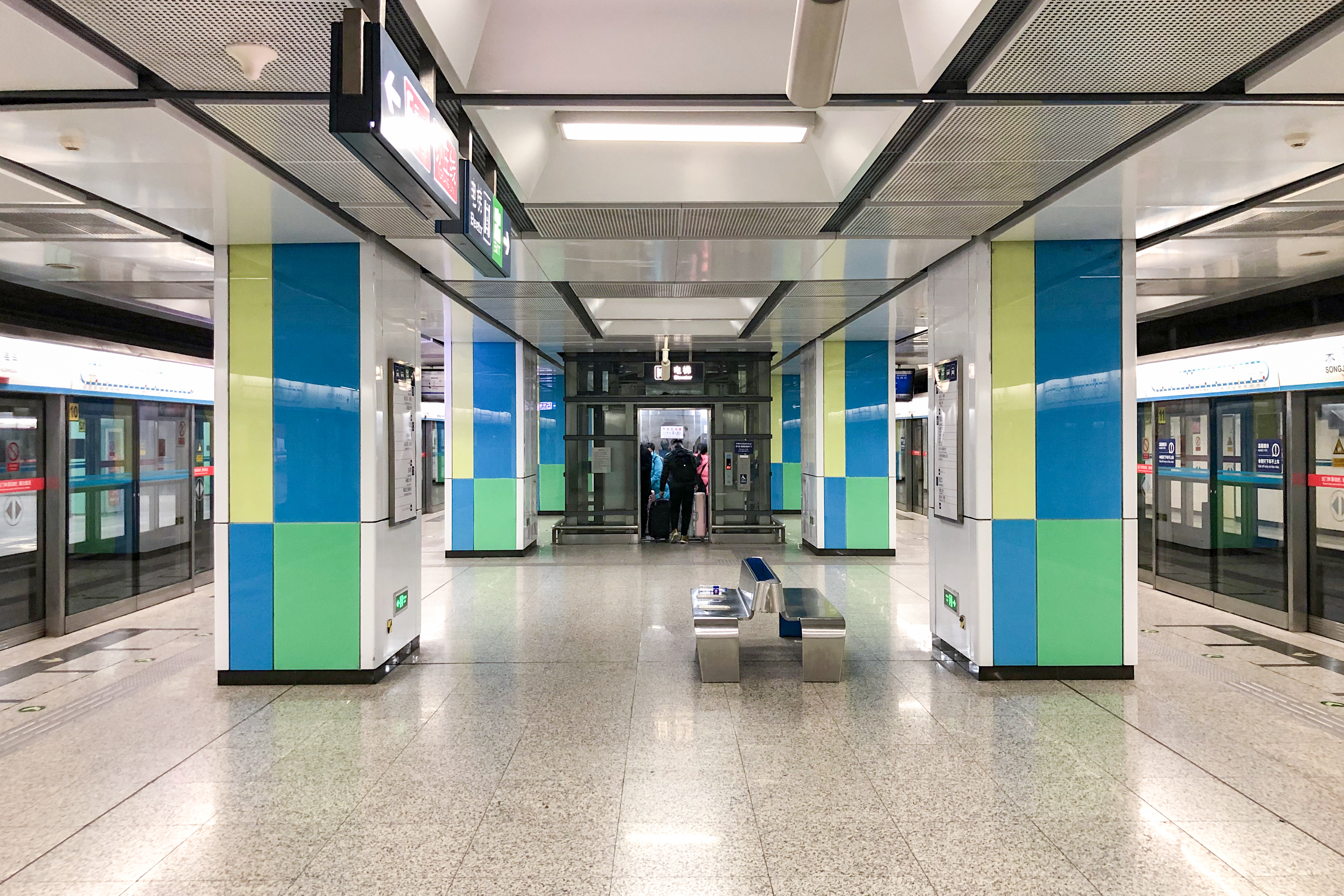
Line 10 counter-clockwise platform

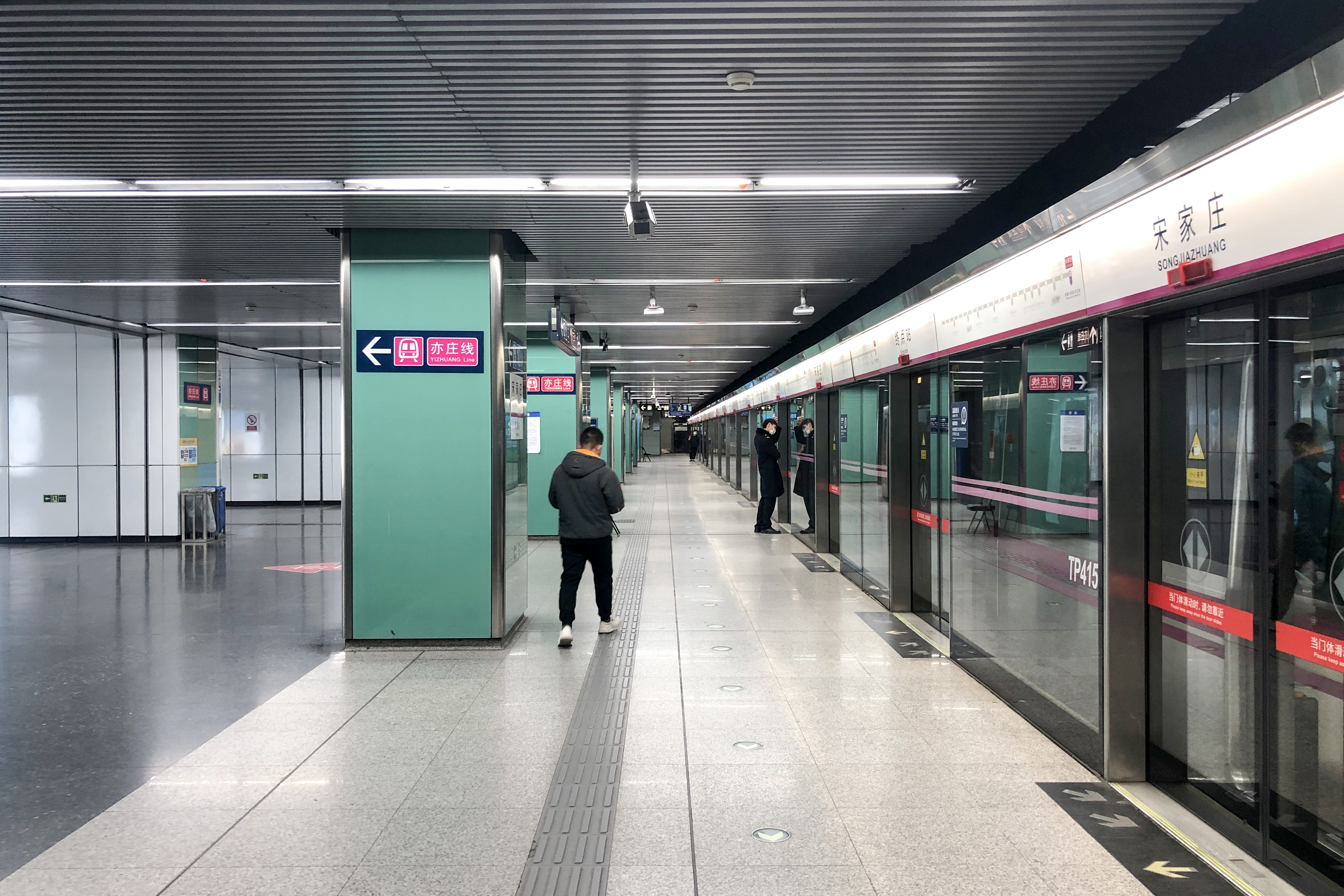
Line 5 alighting platform

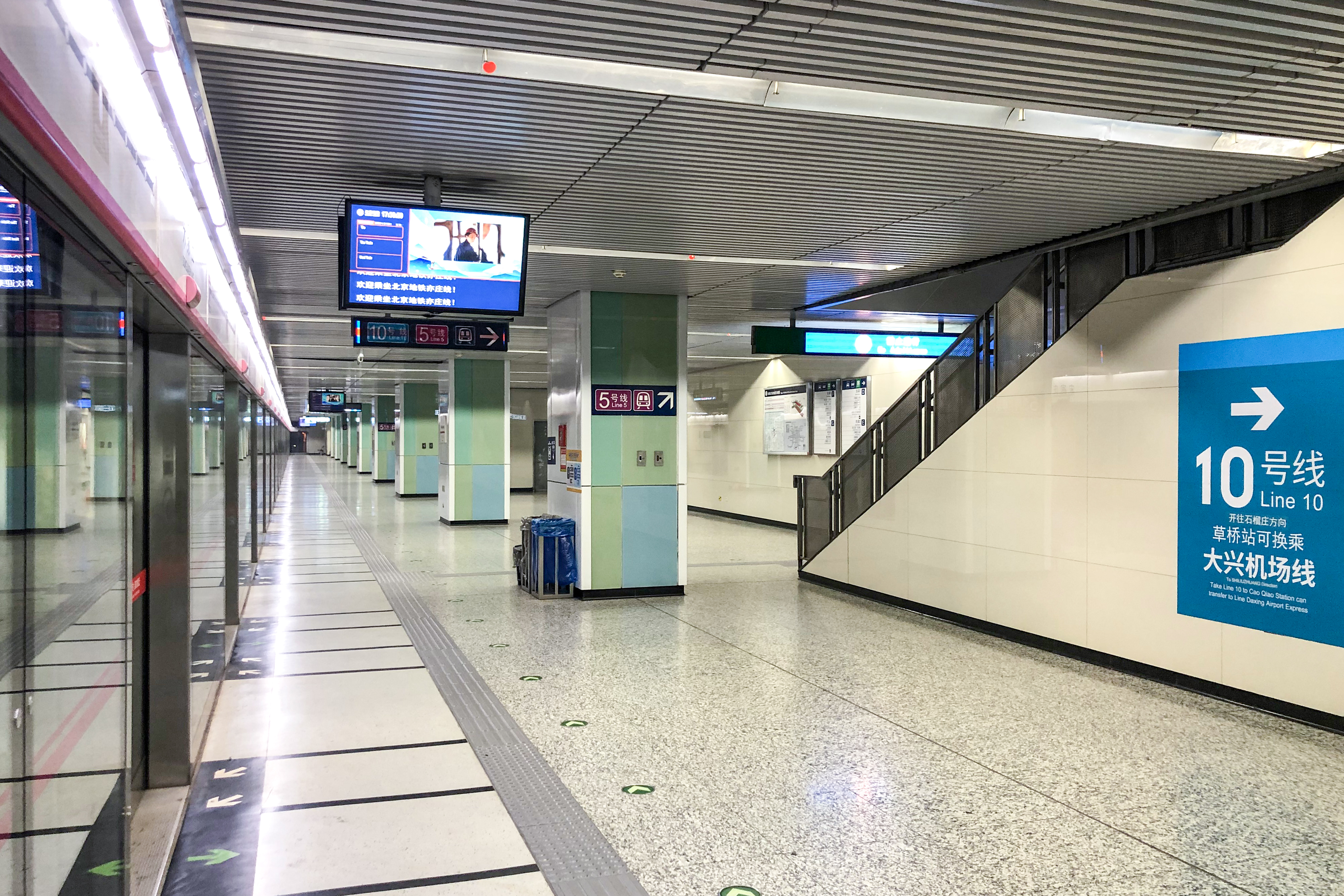
Yizhuang line west alighting platform
