= Yizhuang railway station =

Railway station in Tongzhou, Beijing, China

Coordinates: 39°48′43″N 116°35′46″E

Yizhuang 亦庄
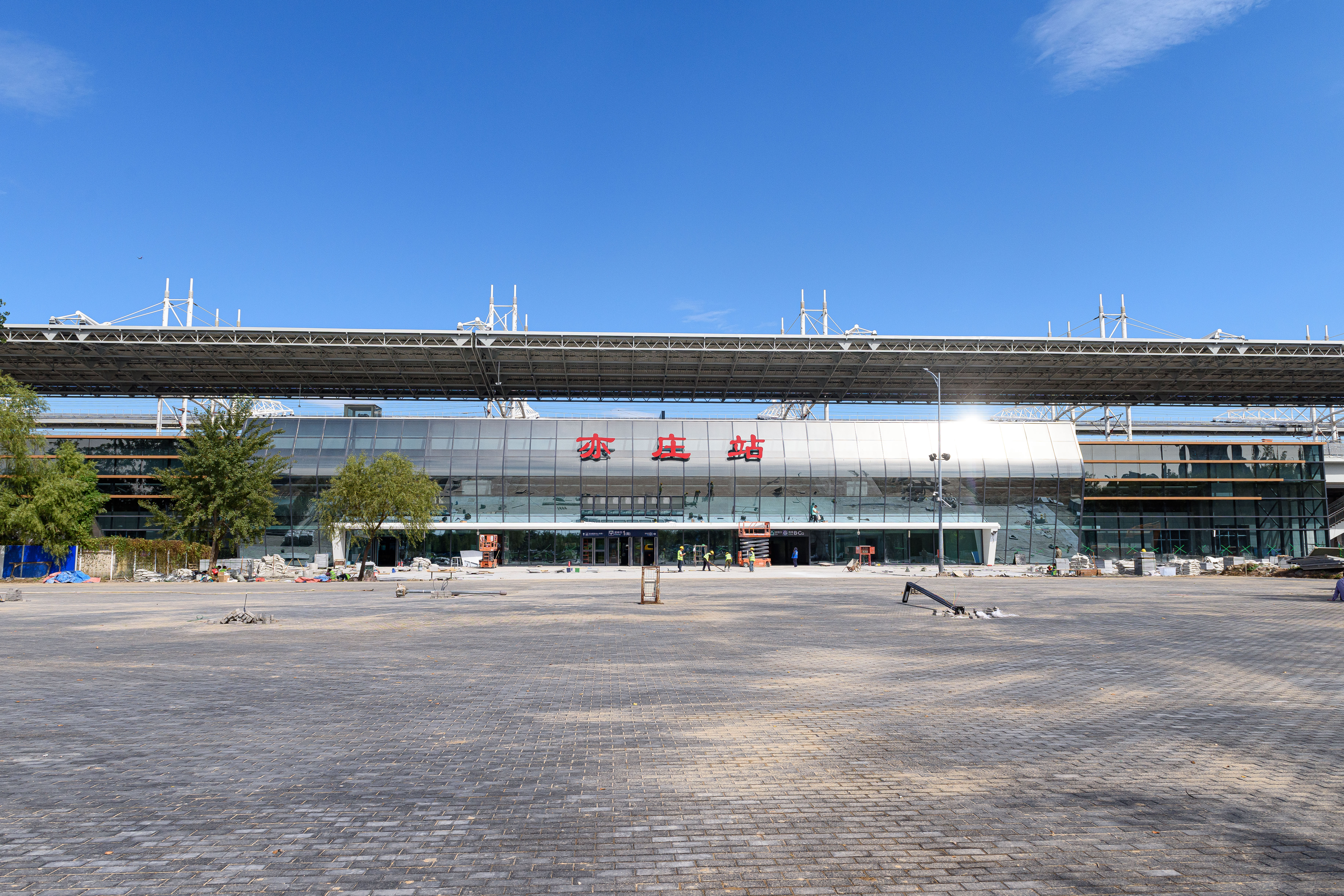
- Yizhuang railway station in September 2024

General information
- Location: Taihu, Tongzhou District, Beijing; China
- Operator: China Railway Beijing Group
- Line: Beijing–Tianjin intercity railway
- Platforms: 2 (2 side platforms)
- Tracks: 4
- Connections: Yizhuang railway station Yizhuang

Construction
- Structure type: Elevated
- Accessible: Yes

Other information
- Station code: YUP (Pinyin: YZH)

History
- Opened: September 29, 2024; 23 months ago

Services
Preceding station	China Railway High-speed	Following station
Beijing South Terminus	Beijing–Tianjin intercity railway	Wuqing towards Binhai
Location
- Location within Beijing Location within China

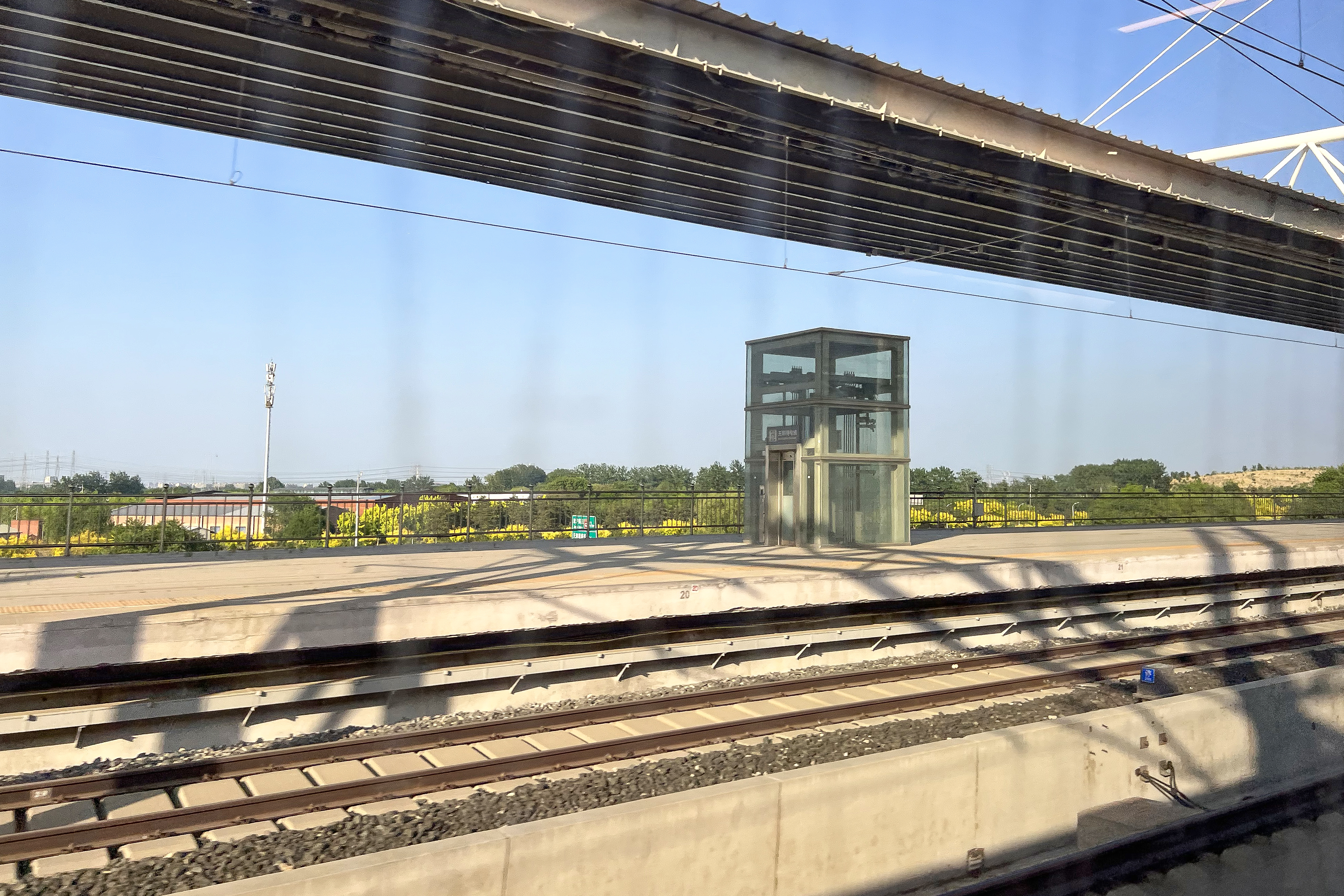
The platform of Yizhuang railway station (May 2024)

Yizhuang railway station (simplified Chinese: 亦庄站; traditional Chinese: 亦莊站; pinyin: Yìzhuāng zhàn) is a railway station on the Beijing–Tianjin intercity railway in Taihu, Tongzhou District, Beijing. It lies right next to the Taihu Toll Gate on the S15 Jingjin Expressway.

It has been fully built but trains used to pass the railway station and not stop from the line opening in 2008 until 2024. Renovation of the Yizhuang railway station started in May 2024. It was opened on 29 September 2024.

== Beijing Subway ==
Yizhuang Railway Station 亦庄火车站
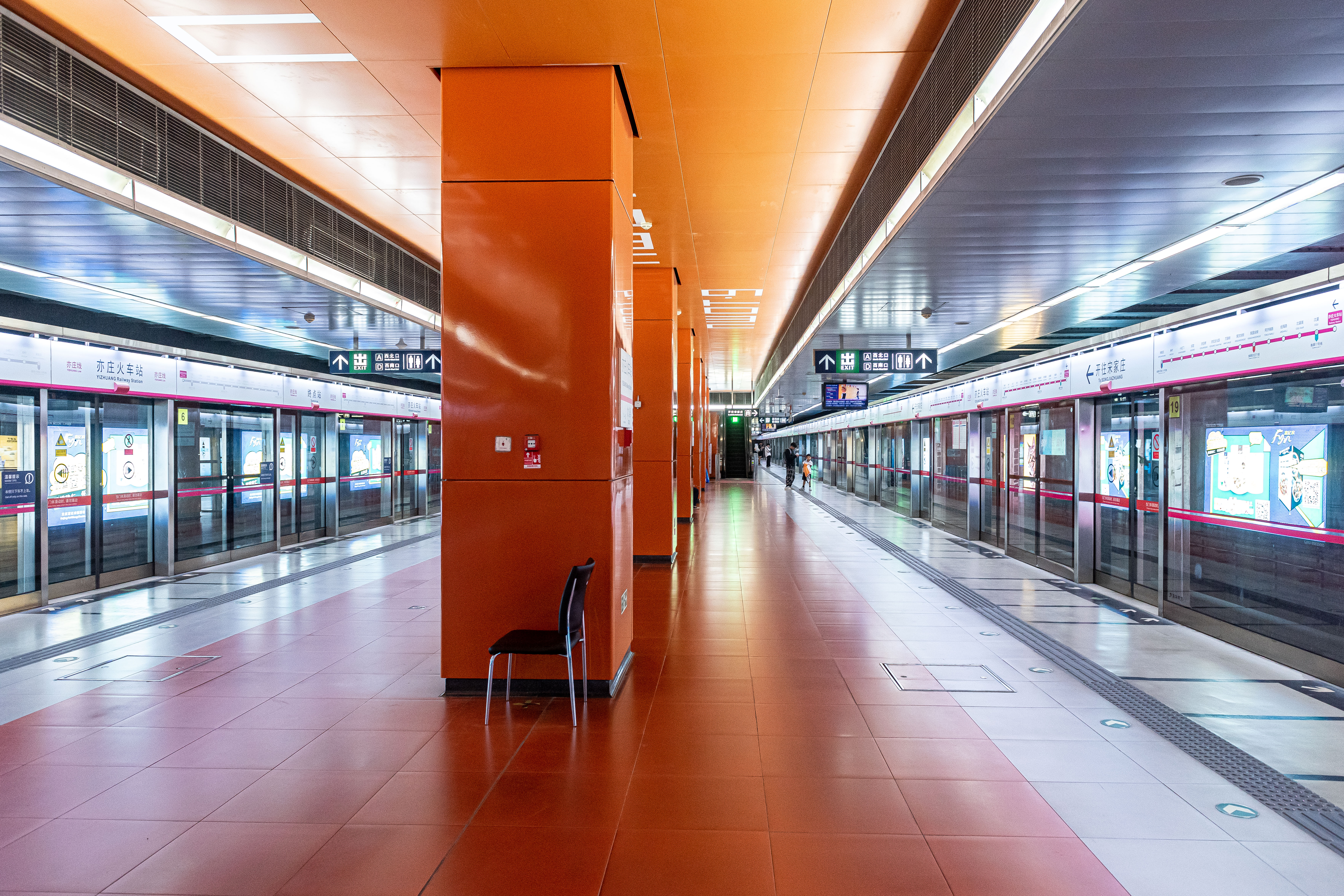
- Platform of the subway station

General information
- Location: Taihu, Tongzhou District, Beijing; China
- Operator: Beijing Mass Transit Railway Operation Corporation Limited
- Line: Yizhuang line
- Platforms: 2 (1 island platform)
- Tracks: 2
- Connections: Yizhuang railway station

Construction
- Structure type: Underground
- Accessible: Yes

History
- Opened: December 30, 2018; 7 years ago (subway station)

Services
Preceding station	Beijing Subway	Following station
Ciqu towards Songjiazhuang	Yizhuang line	Terminus
Location
- Location within Beijing

The railway station is served by a subway station on Yizhuang line of the Beijing Subway. The subway station was opened on December 30, 2018. It was opened before the intercity railway station to serve the residents living nearby.

=== Station layout ===
The station has an underground island platform.

=== Exits ===
There are 2 exits in operation, lettered A and D. Exit A is accessible. Two more exits, lettered B and C, will open in late 2024.
