= Ciqu station =

Beijing Subway Line 17 and Yizhuang line station

Ciqu 次渠
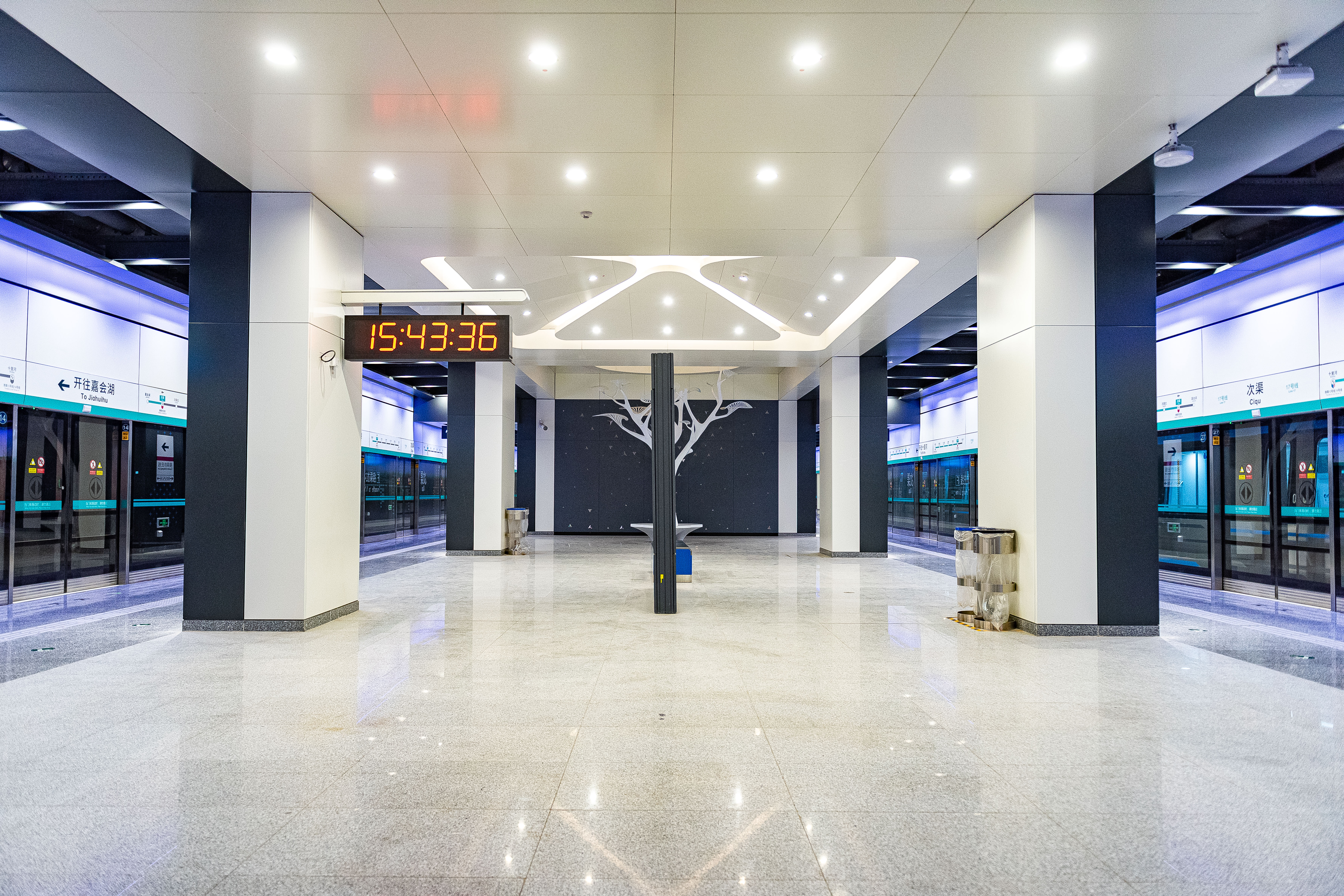
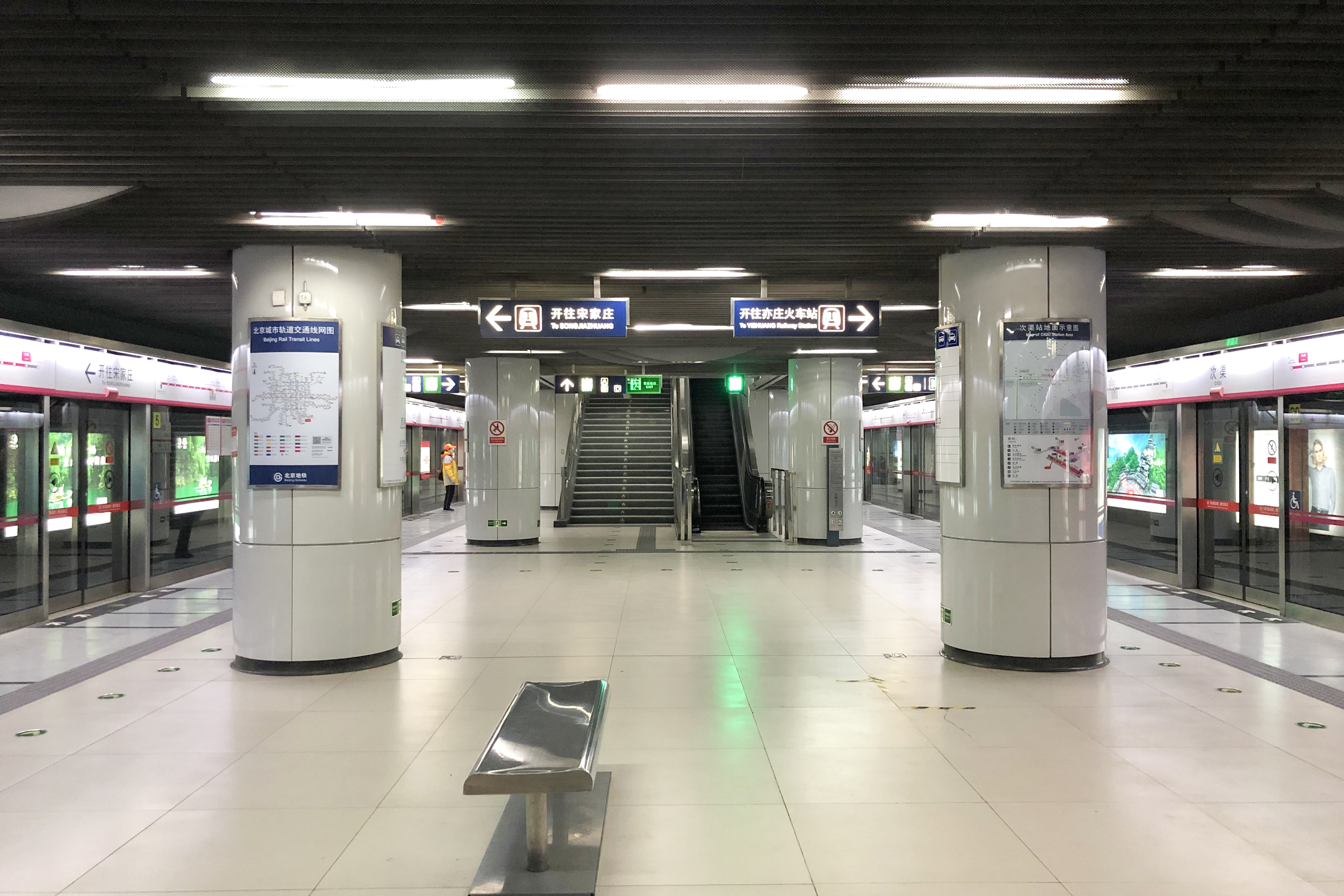
- Line 17 platform Yizhuang Line platform

General information
- Location: Luxi Road (潞西路) and Dongxiao Road (东小路); Taihu, Tongzhou District, Beijing; China
- Coordinates: 39°48′15″N 116°35′30″E
- Operator: Beijing Mass Transit Railway Operation Corporation Limited
- Lines: Line 17; Yizhuang line
- Platforms: 4 (2 island platforms)
- Tracks: 4

Construction
- Structure type: Underground
- Accessible: Yes

History
- Opened: Yizhuang line: December 30, 2010; 15 years ago; Line 17: December 31, 2021; 4 years ago

Services
Preceding station	Beijing Subway	Following station
Ciqubei towards Weilaikexuechengbei (Future Science City North)	Line 17	Jiahuihu Terminus
Ciqunan towards Songjiazhuang	Yizhuang line	Yizhuang railway station Terminus
Location
- Location within Beijing

Ciqu Station (Chinese: 次渠站; pinyin: Cìqú Zhàn; Wade–Giles: tz'u⁴ch'ü² chan⁴) is an interchange station on the Yizhuang line and Line 17 of the Beijing Subway. It opened on December 30, 2010, together with the other stations on the Yizhuang line. The station was the terminus of the Yizhuang line until December 30, 2018. Line 17 opened on December 31, 2021.

== Features ==
Both Yizhuang line and line 17 stations have underground island platforms. There are 5 exits, lettered A, B, D, F and H. Exit A is accessible via an elevator.

== Gallery ==
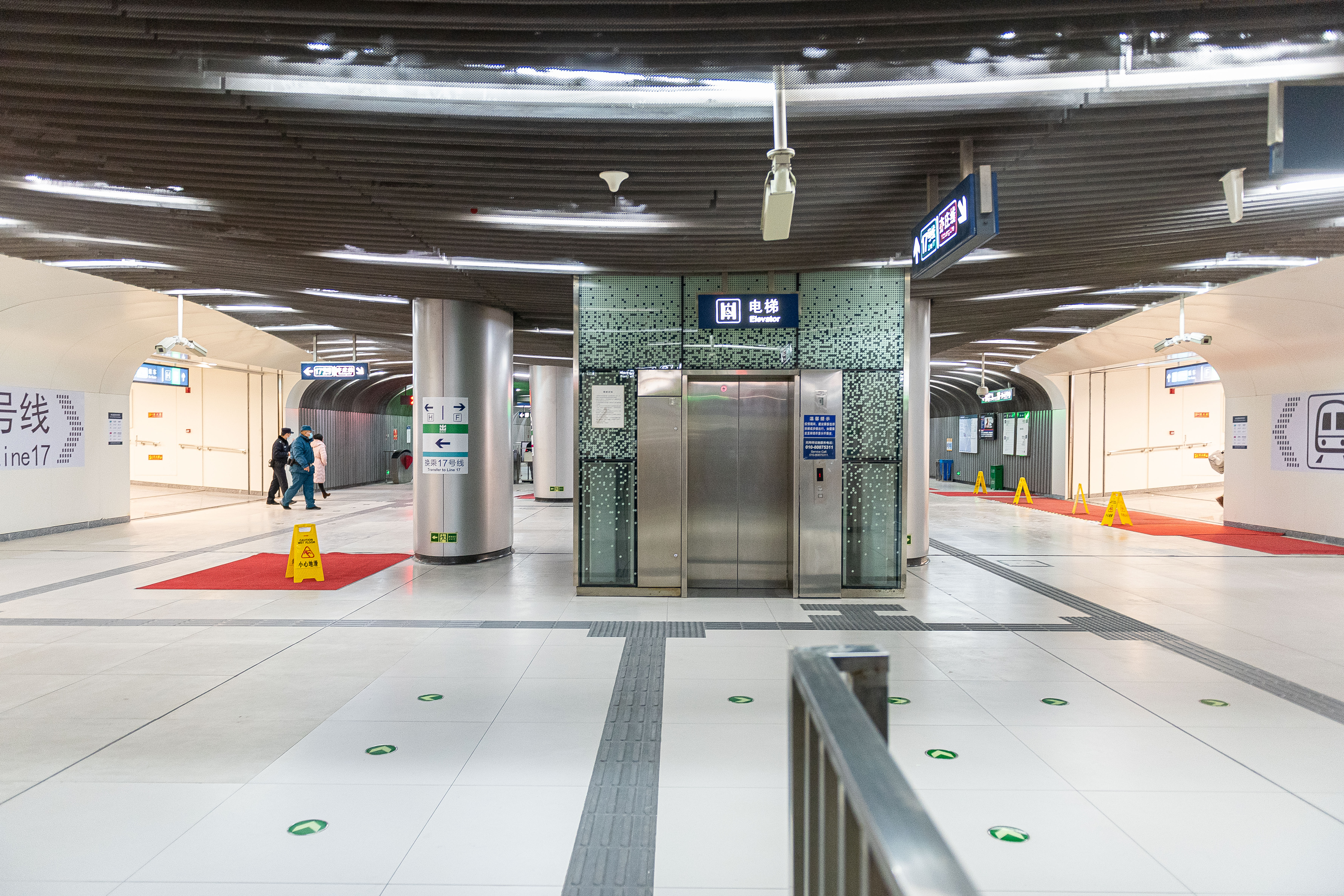
Yizhuang Line concourse

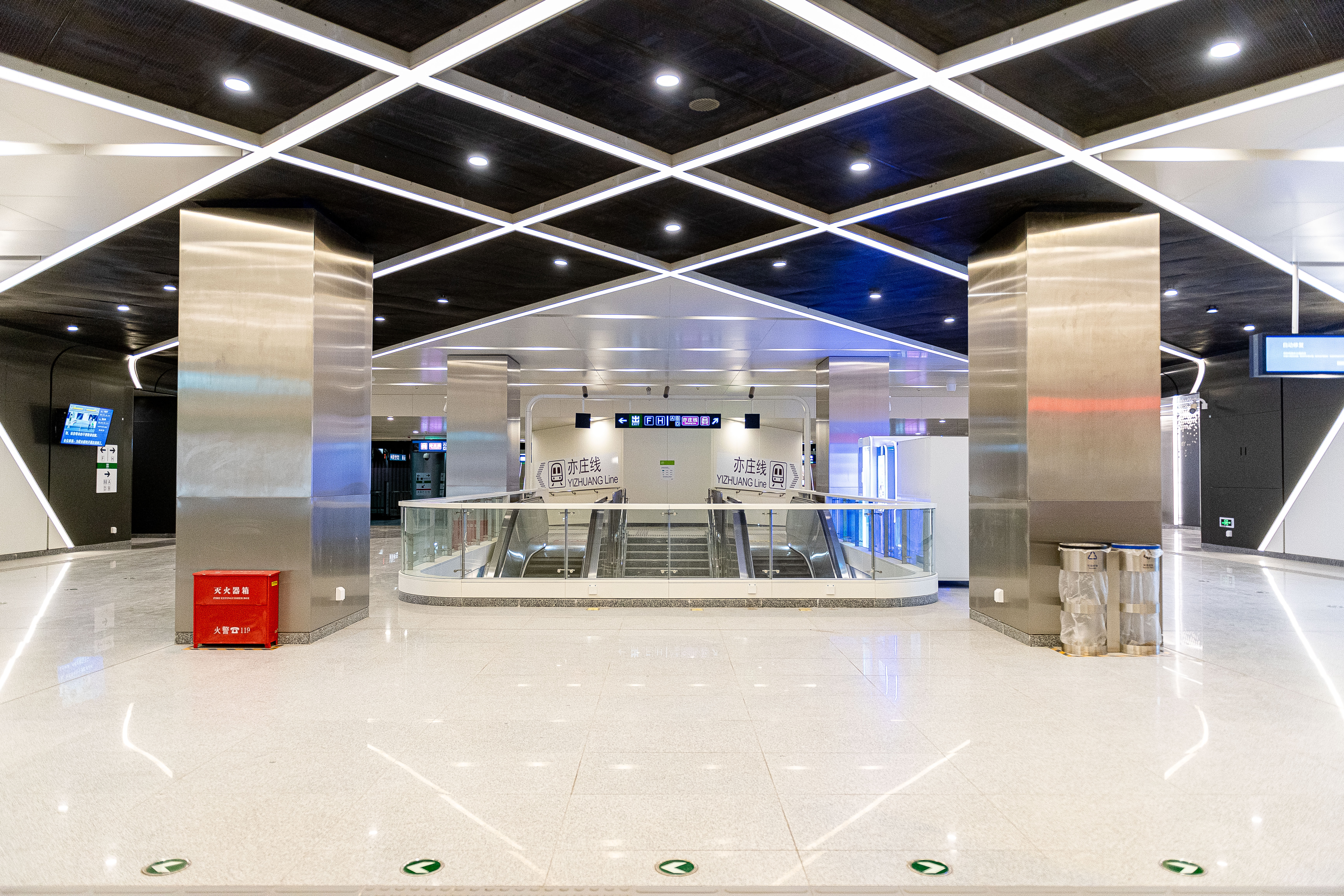
Line 17 concourse
