= Gulou Dajie station =

Beijing Subway interchange station

Coordinates: 39.9490°N 116.3938°E

Gulou Dajie 鼓楼大街
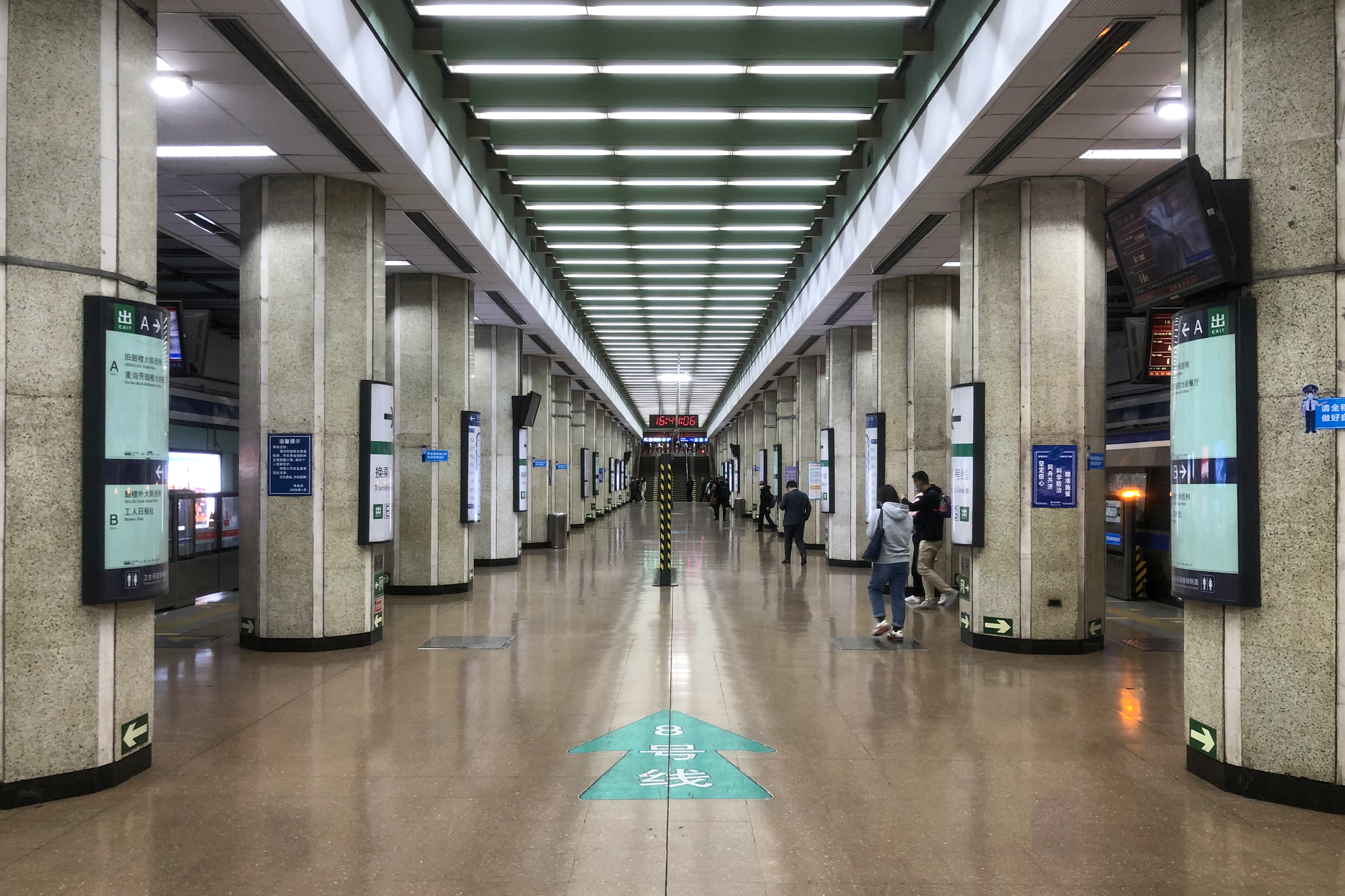
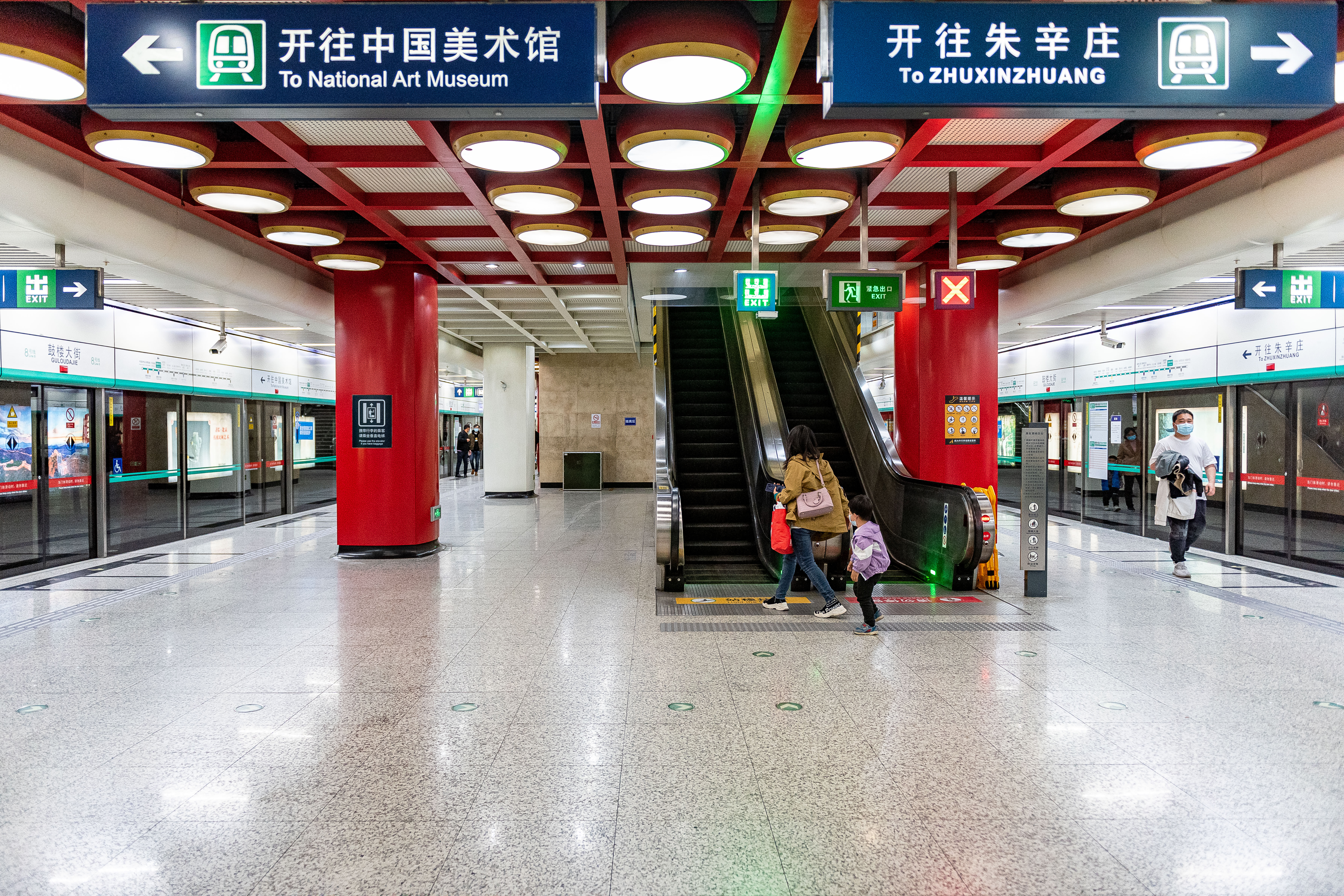
- Line 2 platform Line 8 platform

General information
- Location: Xicheng District / Dongcheng District border, Beijing; China
- Operator: Beijing Mass Transit Railway Operation Corporation Limited
- Lines: Line 2; Line 8
- Platforms: 4 (2 island platforms)
- Tracks: 4

Construction
- Structure type: Underground
- Accessible: Yes

Other information
- Station code: 217 (Line 2)

History
- Opened: September 20, 1984; 41 years ago (Line 2); December 30, 2012; 13 years ago (Line 8)

Services
Preceding station	Beijing Subway	Following station
Jishuitan outer loop / anticlockwise	Line 2	Anding Men inner loop / clockwise
Andeli Beijie towards Zhuxinzhuang	Line 8	Shichahai towards Yinghai
Location
- Location within Beijing

Gulou Dajie Station (simplified Chinese: 鼓楼大街站; traditional Chinese: 鼓樓大街站; pinyin: Gǔlóudàjiē Zhàn; lit. 'Gulou Street') is a station on Line 2 and Line 8 of the Beijing Subway. The connection to line 8 opened on December 30, 2012.

== Station layout ==
Both the line 2 and 8 stations have underground island platforms.

== Exits ==
There are 6 exits, lettered A1, A2, B, E, F, and G. Exit B is accessible.

== Gallery ==
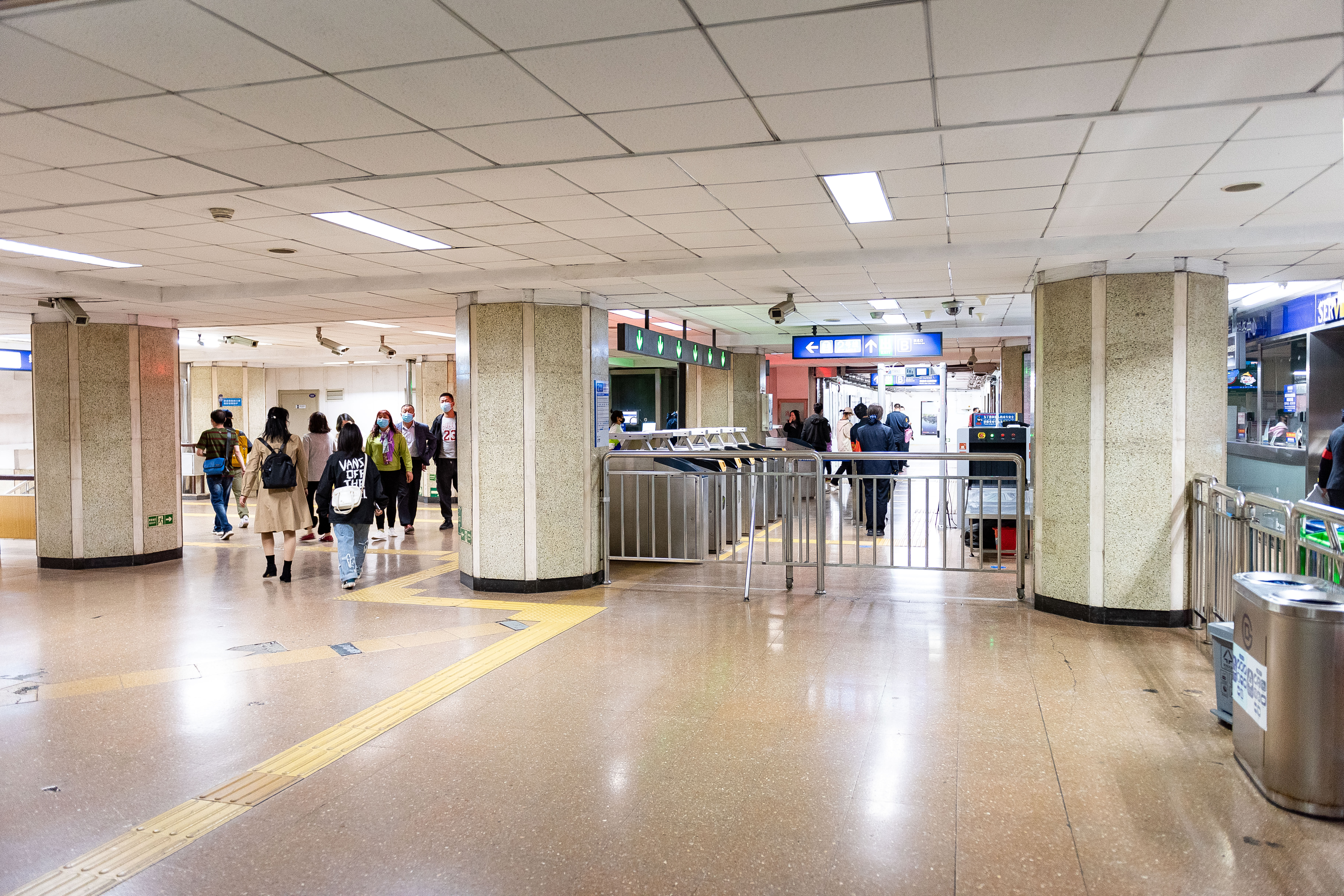
Line 2 east concourse

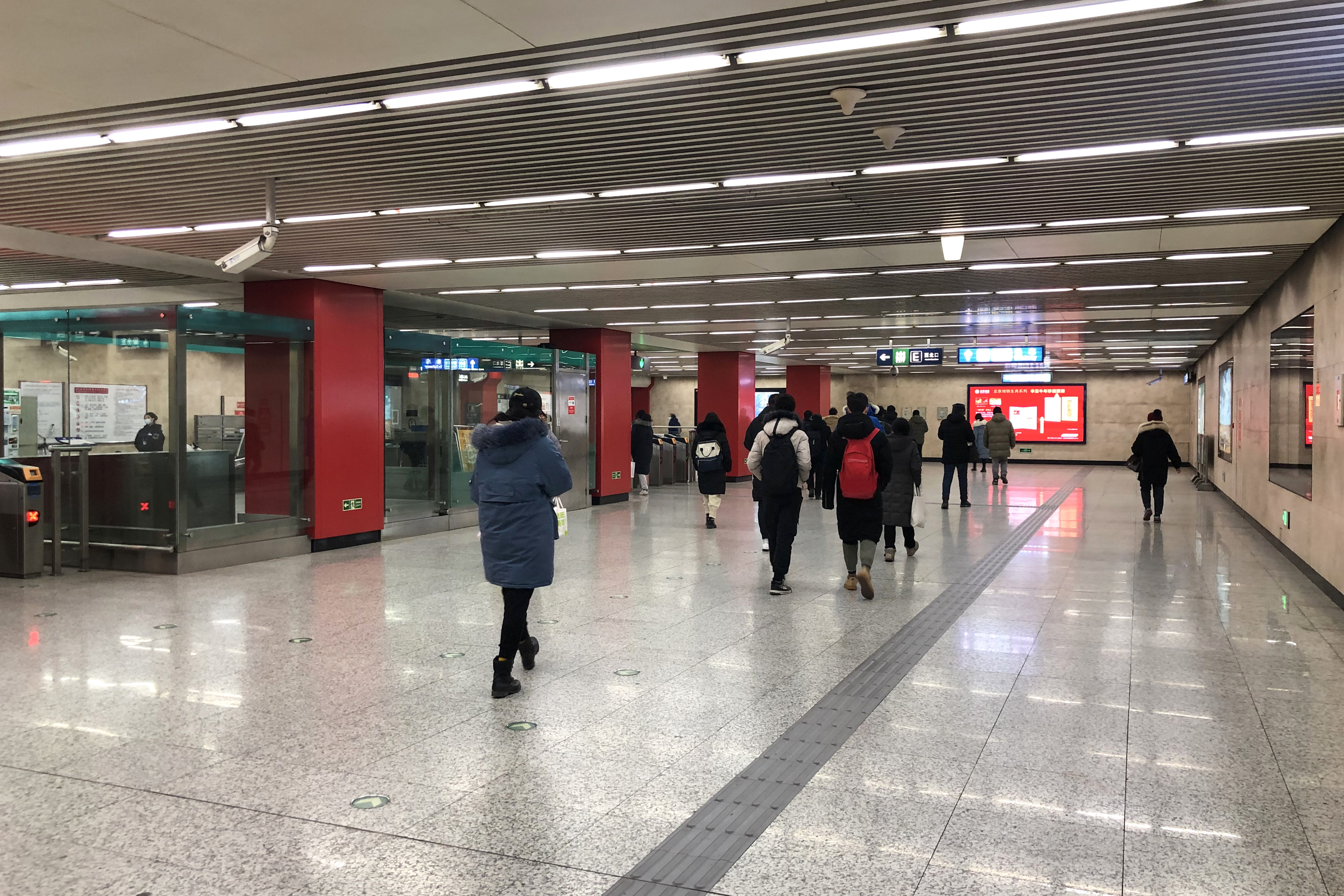
Line 2 west concourse

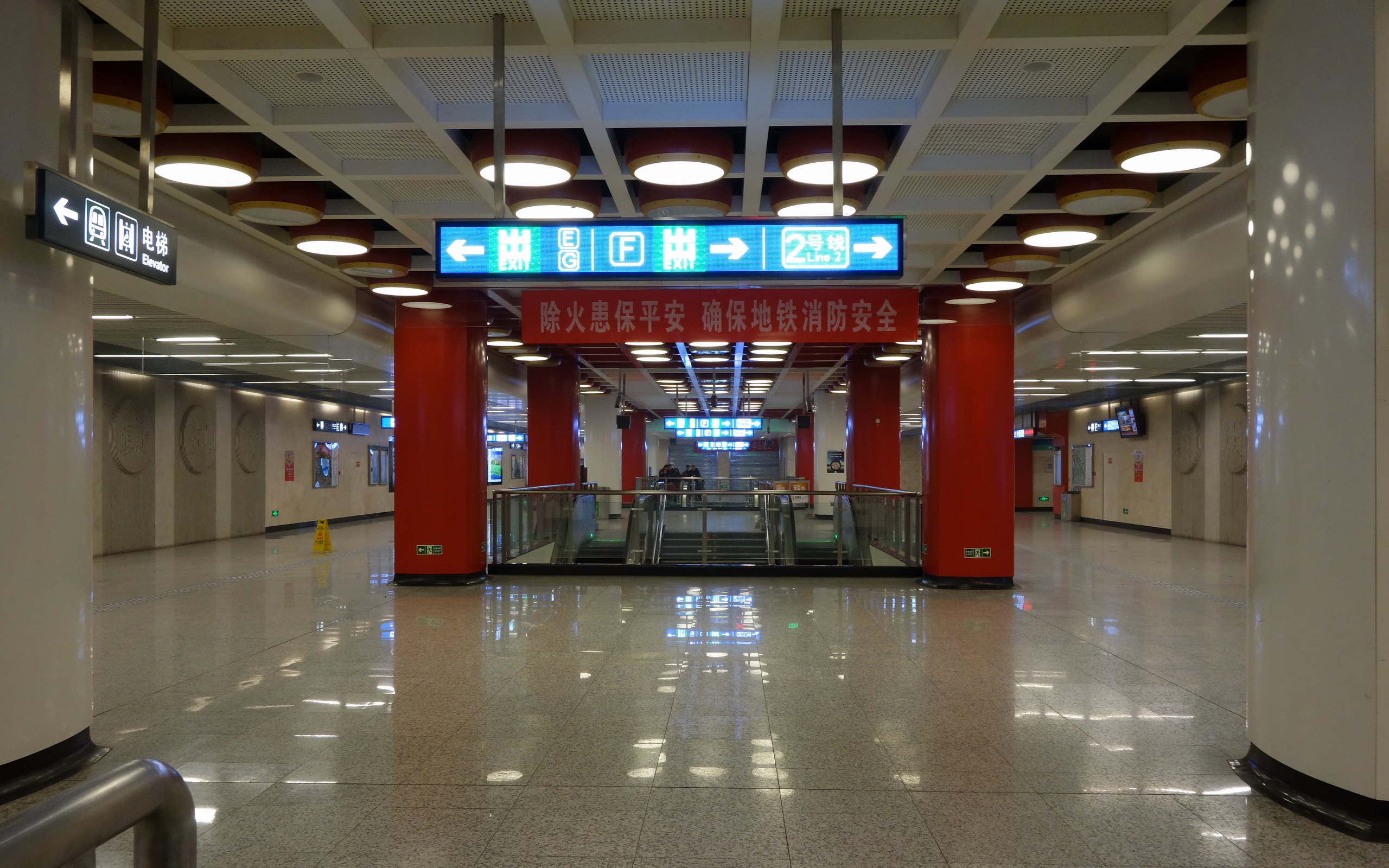
Line 8 concourse (February 2014)

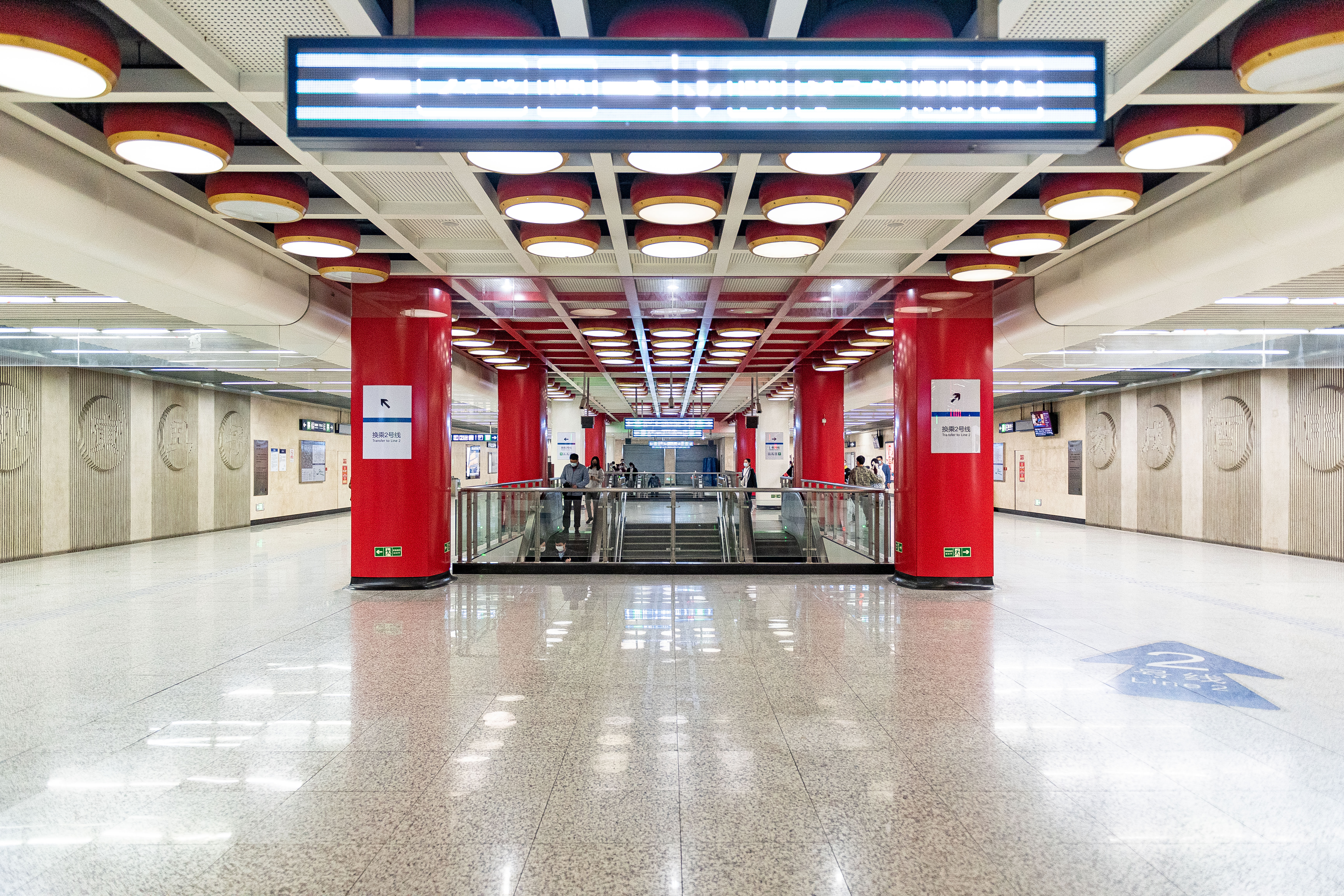
Line 8 concourse (May 2021)

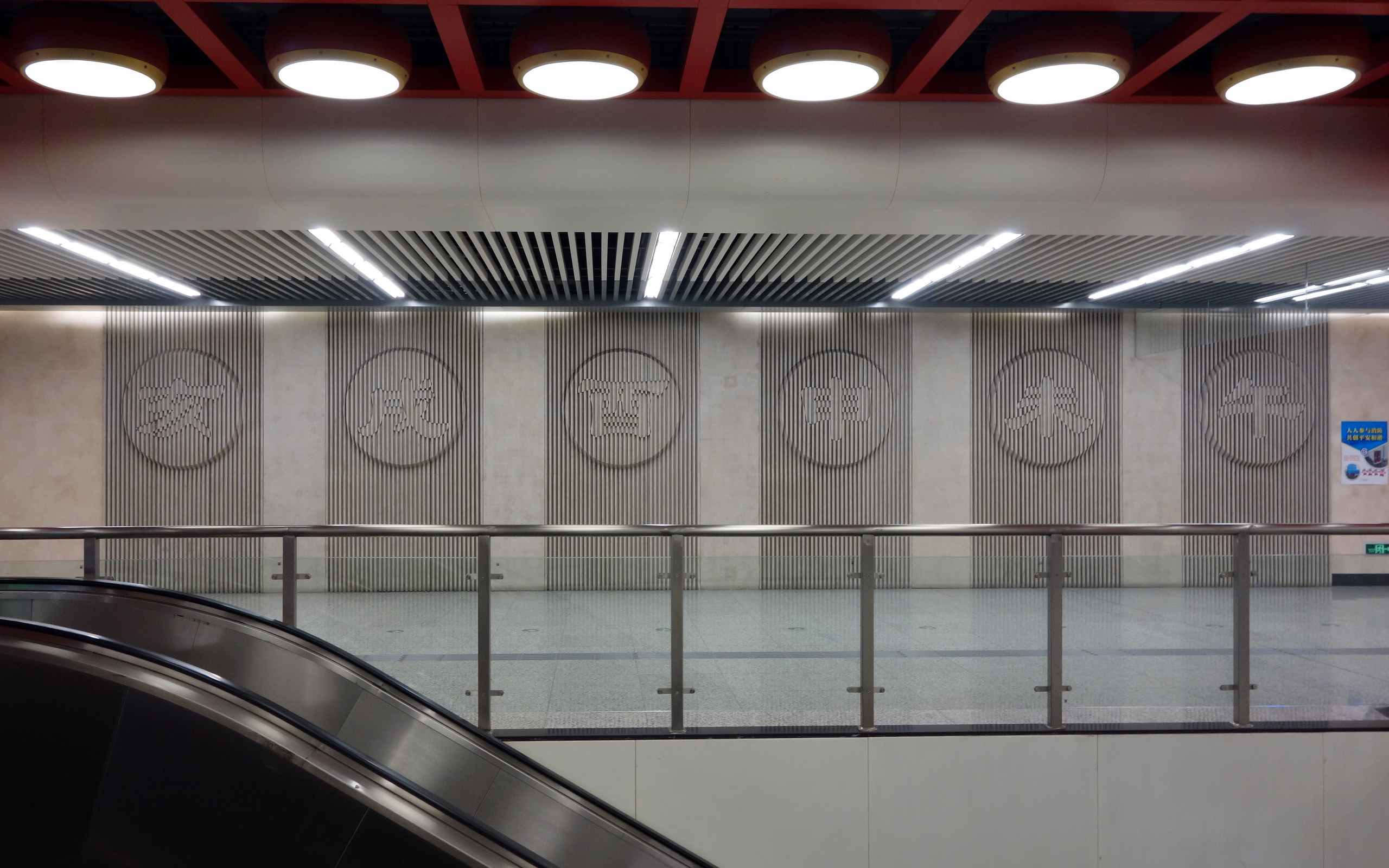
Line 8 Art work

A train of Line 2 is arriving at Guloudajie Station
