= Anhua Qiao station =

Beijing Subway Line 8 and Line 12 station

Anhua Qiao 安华桥
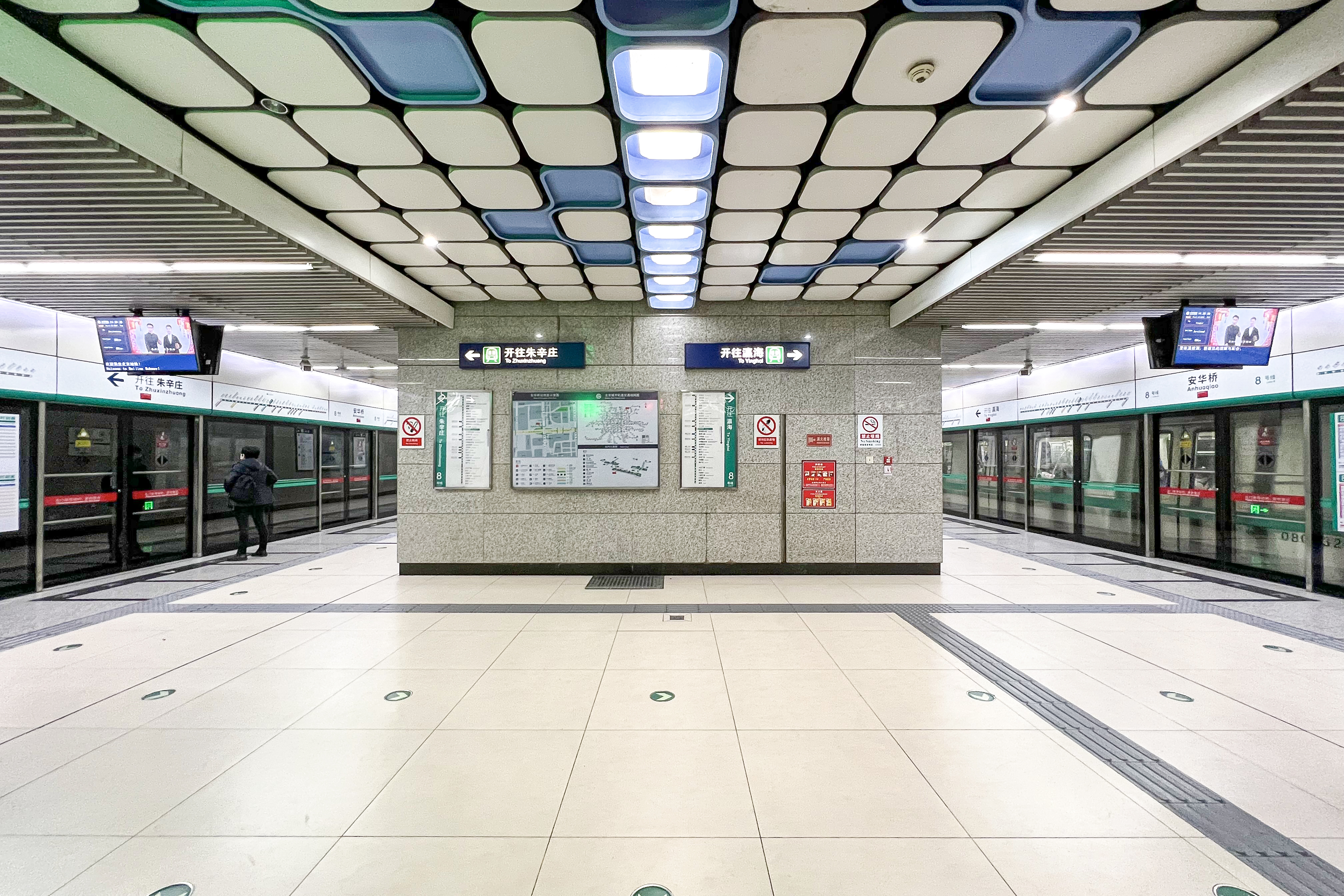
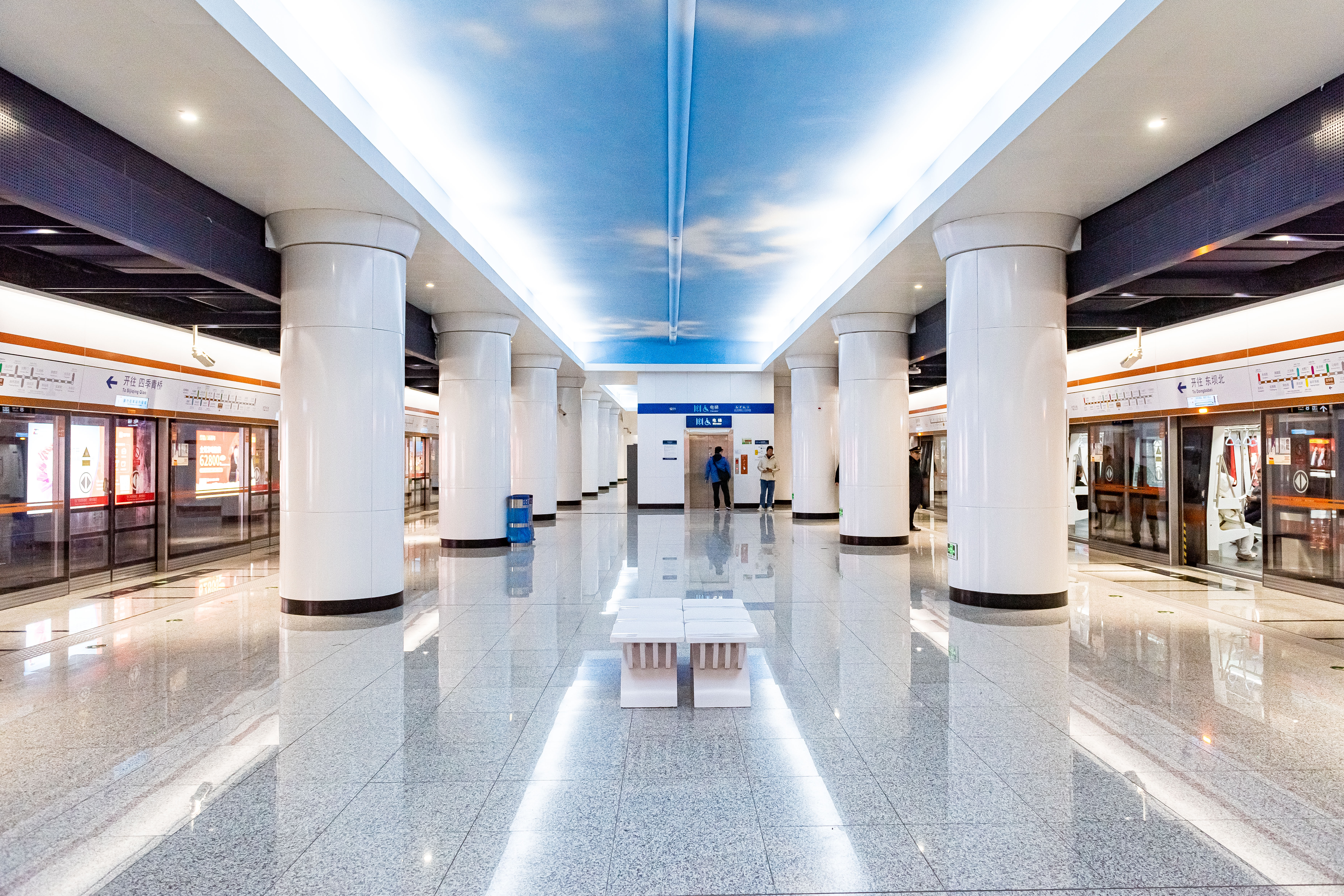
- Line 8 platform Line 12 platform

General information
- Location: Anhua Bridge (North 3rd Ring Road Middle and Beichen Road and Gulou Outer Street (鼓楼外大街)); Xicheng District / Chaoyang District border, Beijing; China
- Coordinates: 39°58′07″N 116°23′41″E
- Operator: Beijing Mass Transit Railway Operation Corporation Limited
- Lines: Line 8; Line 12
- Platforms: 4 (2 island platforms)
- Tracks: 4

Construction
- Structure type: Underground
- Accessible: Yes

History
- Opened: Line 8: December 30, 2012; 13 years ago; Line 12: December 15, 2024; 20 months ago

Services
Preceding station	Beijing Subway	Following station
Beitucheng towards Zhuxinzhuang	Line 8	Andeli Beijie towards Yinghai
Madian Qiao towards Sijiqing Qiao	Line 12	Anzhen Qiao towards Dongbabei
Location
- Location within Beijing

Anhua Qiao station (simplified Chinese: 安华桥站; traditional Chinese: 安華橋站; pinyin: Ānhuá Qiáo zhàn) is a station on Line 8 and Line 12 of the Beijing Subway. This station opened on December 30, 2012.

== Station layout ==
The station has an underground island platform.

== Exits ==
There are 7 exits, lettered A, B, C, D, E, F and G. Exits B, D and F have accessible elevators.

== Gallery ==
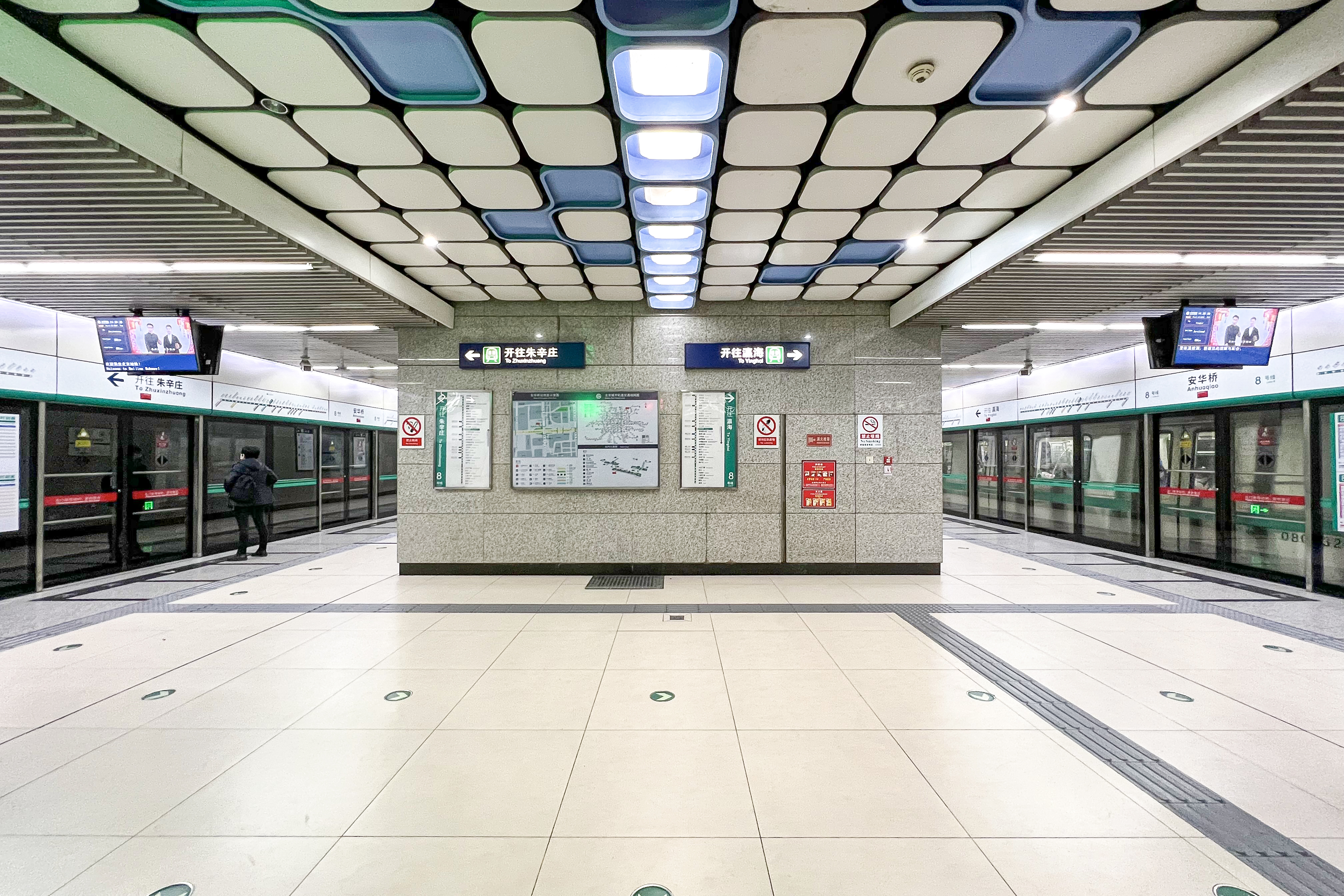
Line 8 Platform (2022)

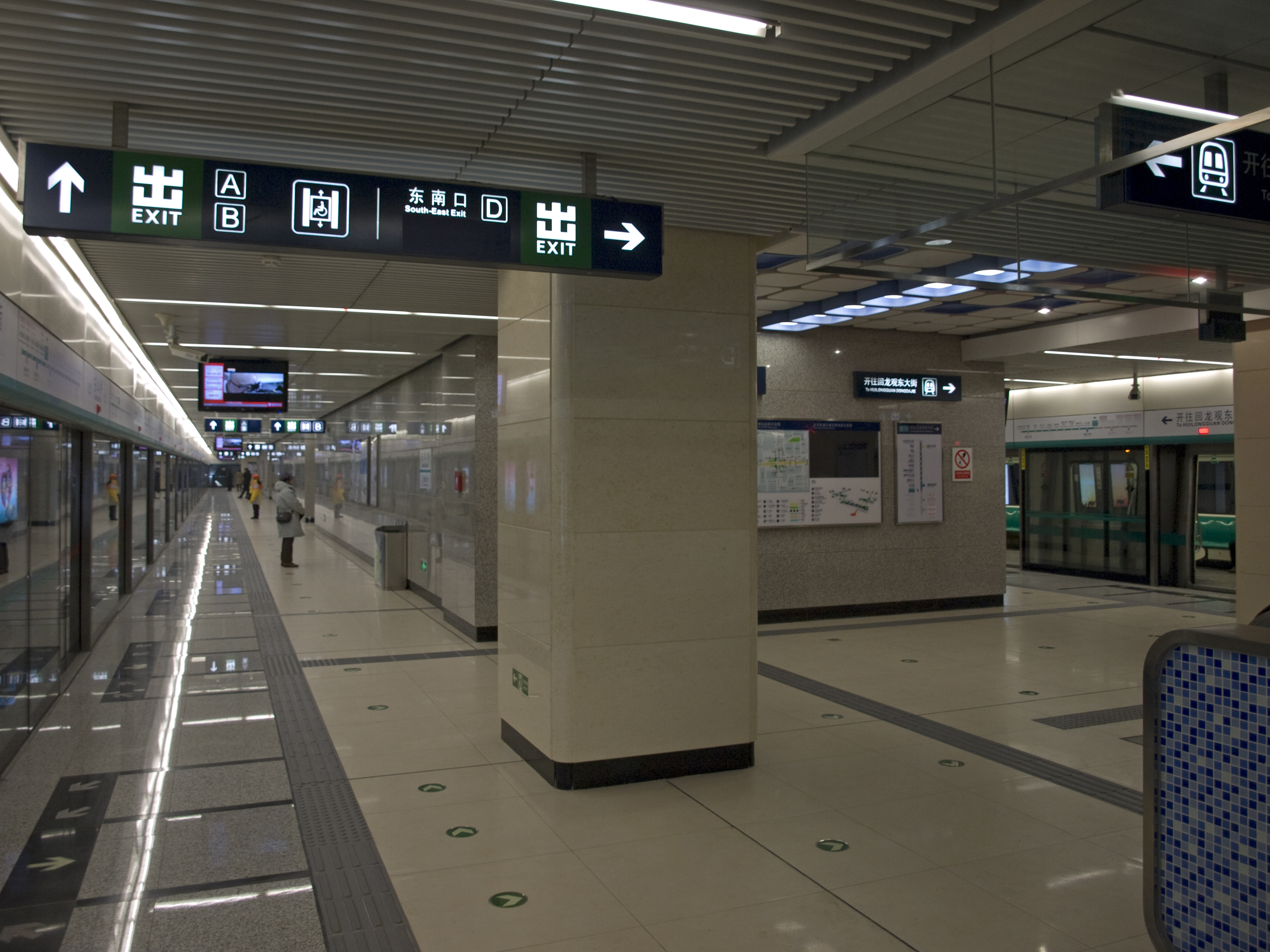
Line 8 platform on its first day of operation

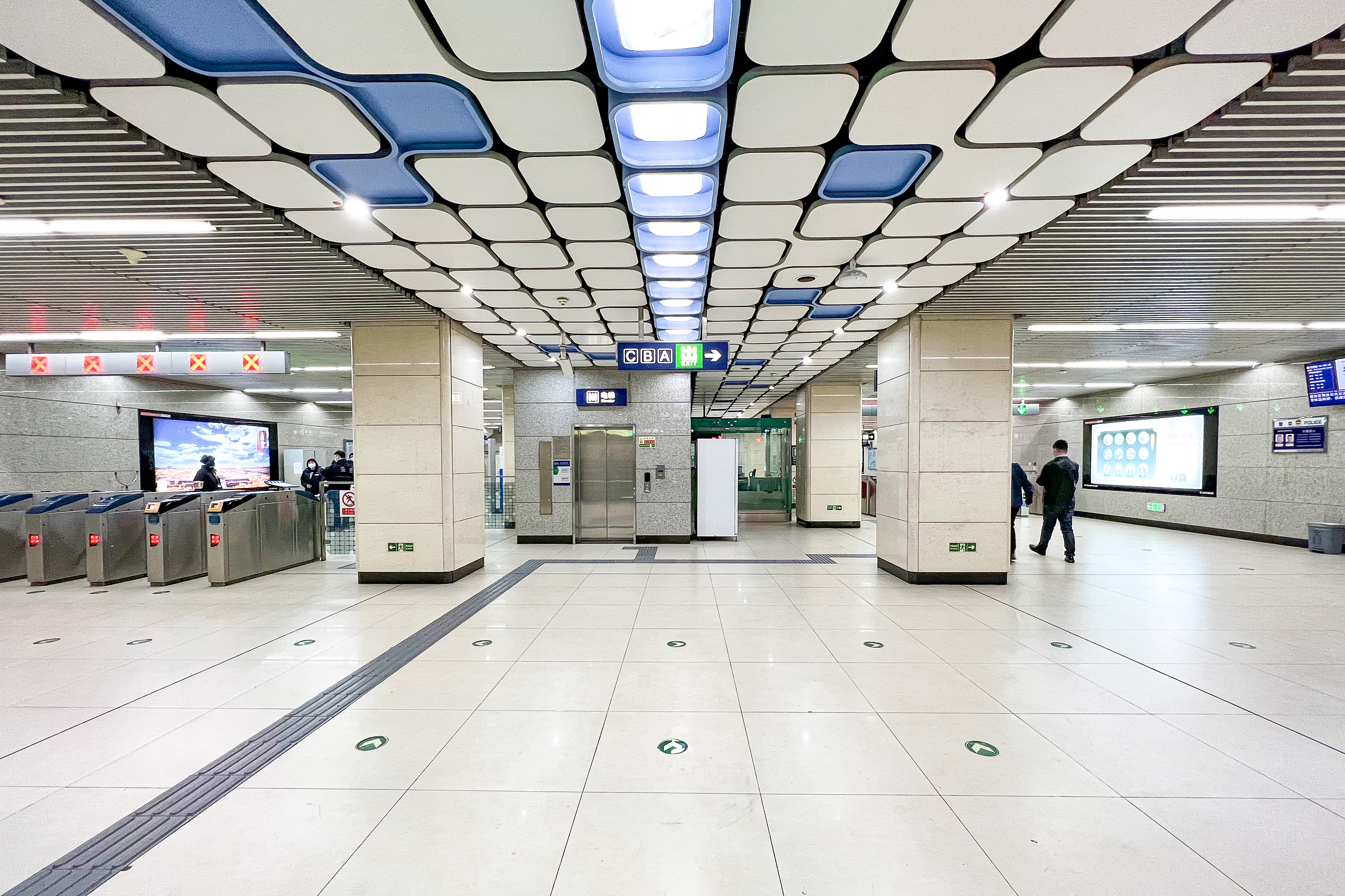
North concourse, Line 8

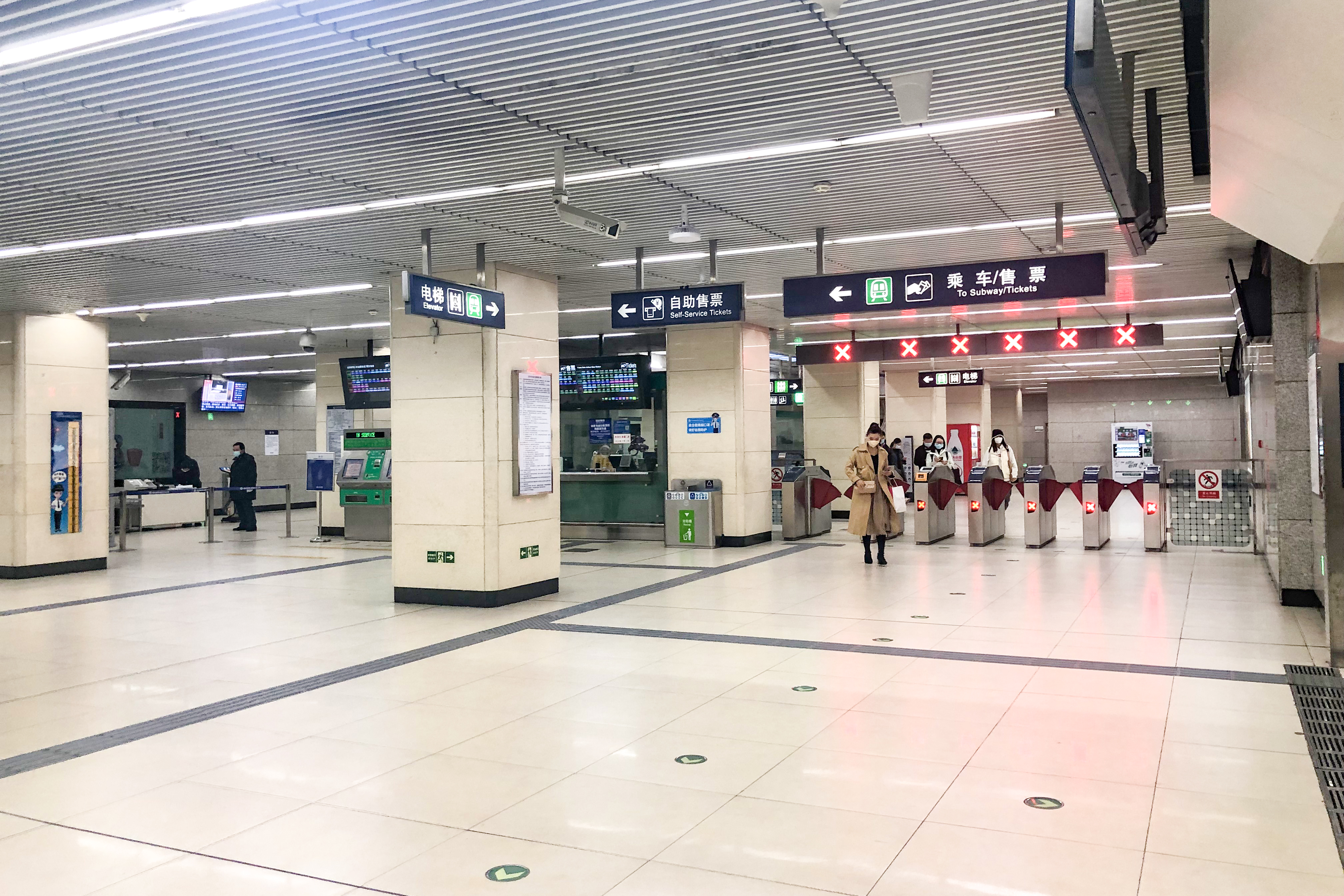
South concourse, Line 8

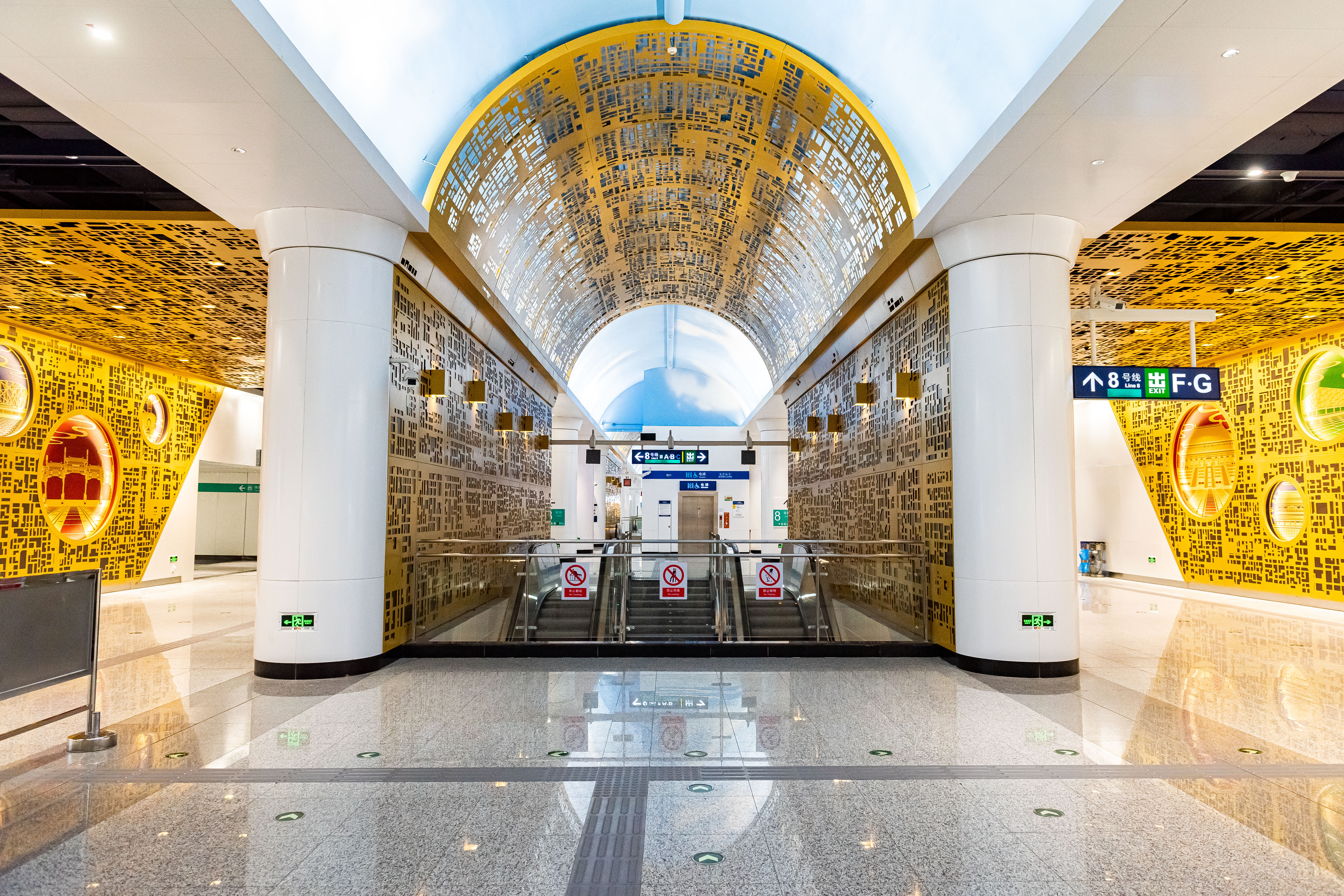
Line 12 concourse

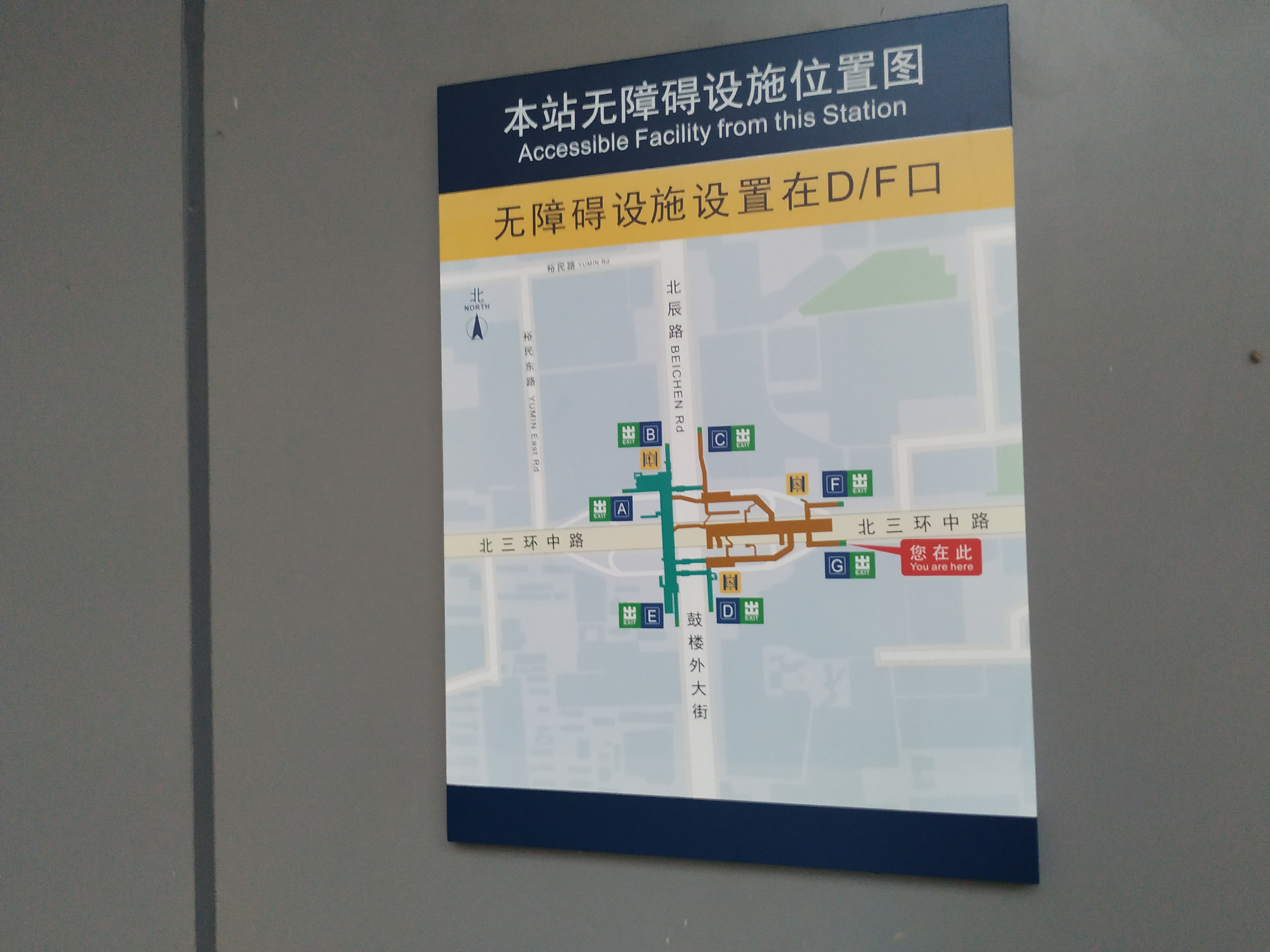
Exit G Map, Anhua Qiao Station (2024)
