= Andeli Beijie station =

Beijing Subway station

Coordinates: 39.957227°N 116.395145°E

Andeli Beijie 安德里北街
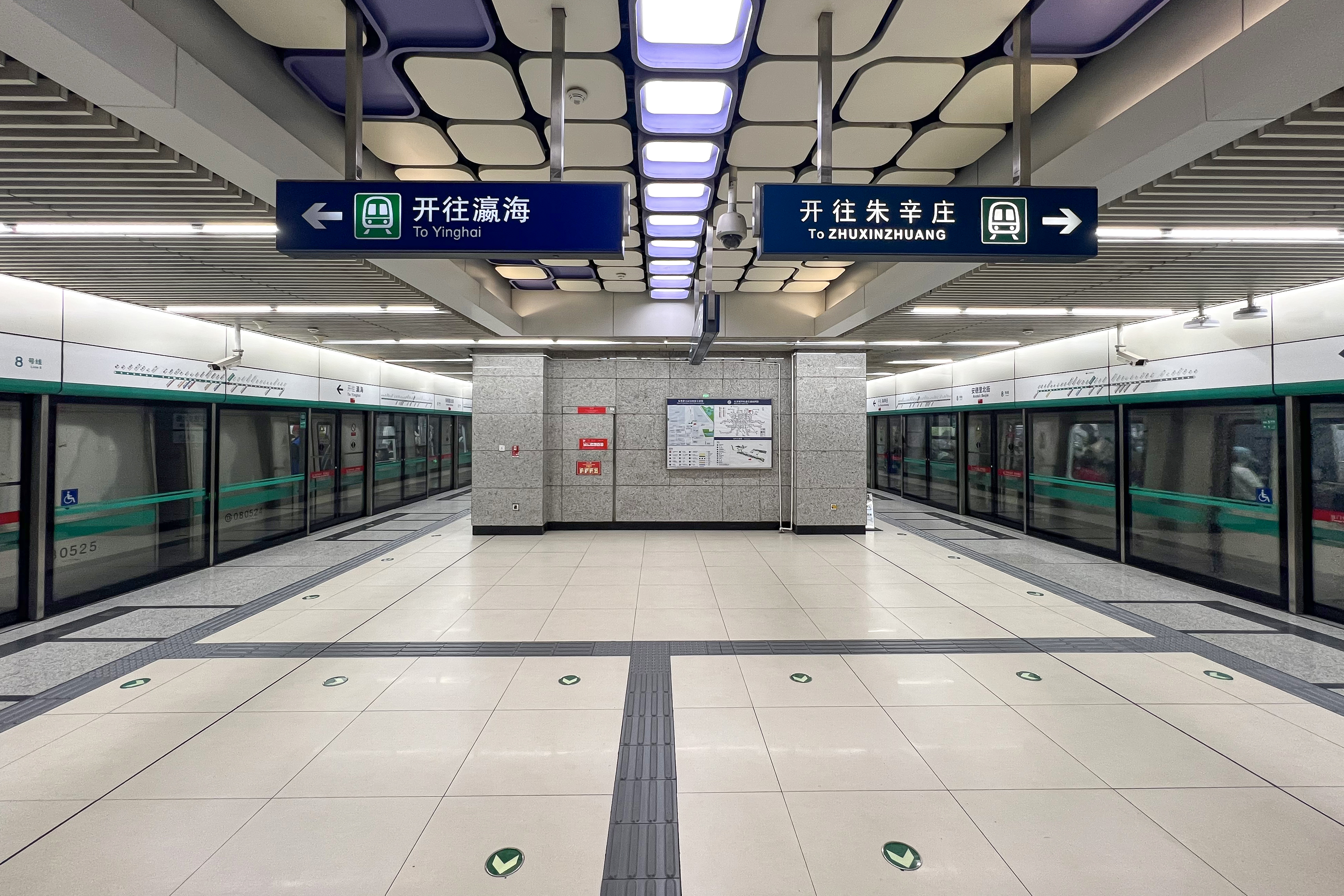
- Platform

General information
- Location: Gulou Outer Street (鼓楼外大街) and Andeli North Street (安德里北街); Dongcheng District, Beijing; China
- Operator: Beijing Mass Transit Railway Operation Corporation Limited
- Line: Line 8
- Platforms: 2 (1 island platform)
- Tracks: 2

Construction
- Structure type: Underground
- Accessible: Yes

History
- Opened: December 26, 2015

Services
Preceding station	Beijing Subway	Following station
Anhua Qiao towards Zhuxinzhuang	Line 8	Gulou Dajie towards Yinghai
Location
- Location within Beijing

Andeli Beijie station (Chinese: 安德里北街站; pinyin: Āndélǐ Běijiē zhàn; lit. 'Andeli North Street station') is a station on Line 8 of the Beijing Subway. It opened on December 26, 2015.

== Station layout ==
The station has an underground island platform.

There are 2 exits, lettered B and D. Exit B is accessible.
