= Heping Xiqiao station =

Beijing Subway Line 5 and Line 12 station

Heping Xiqiao 和平西桥
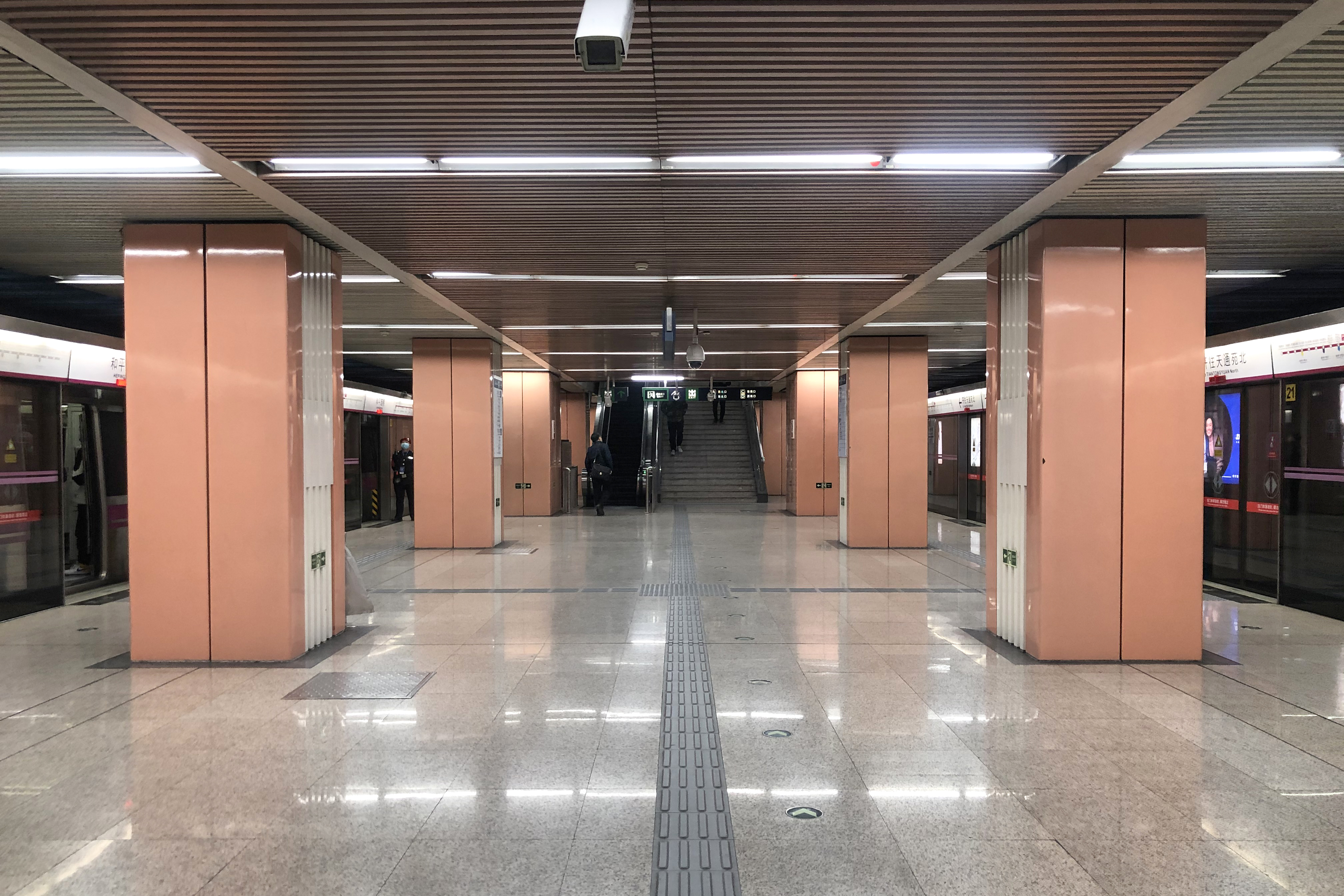
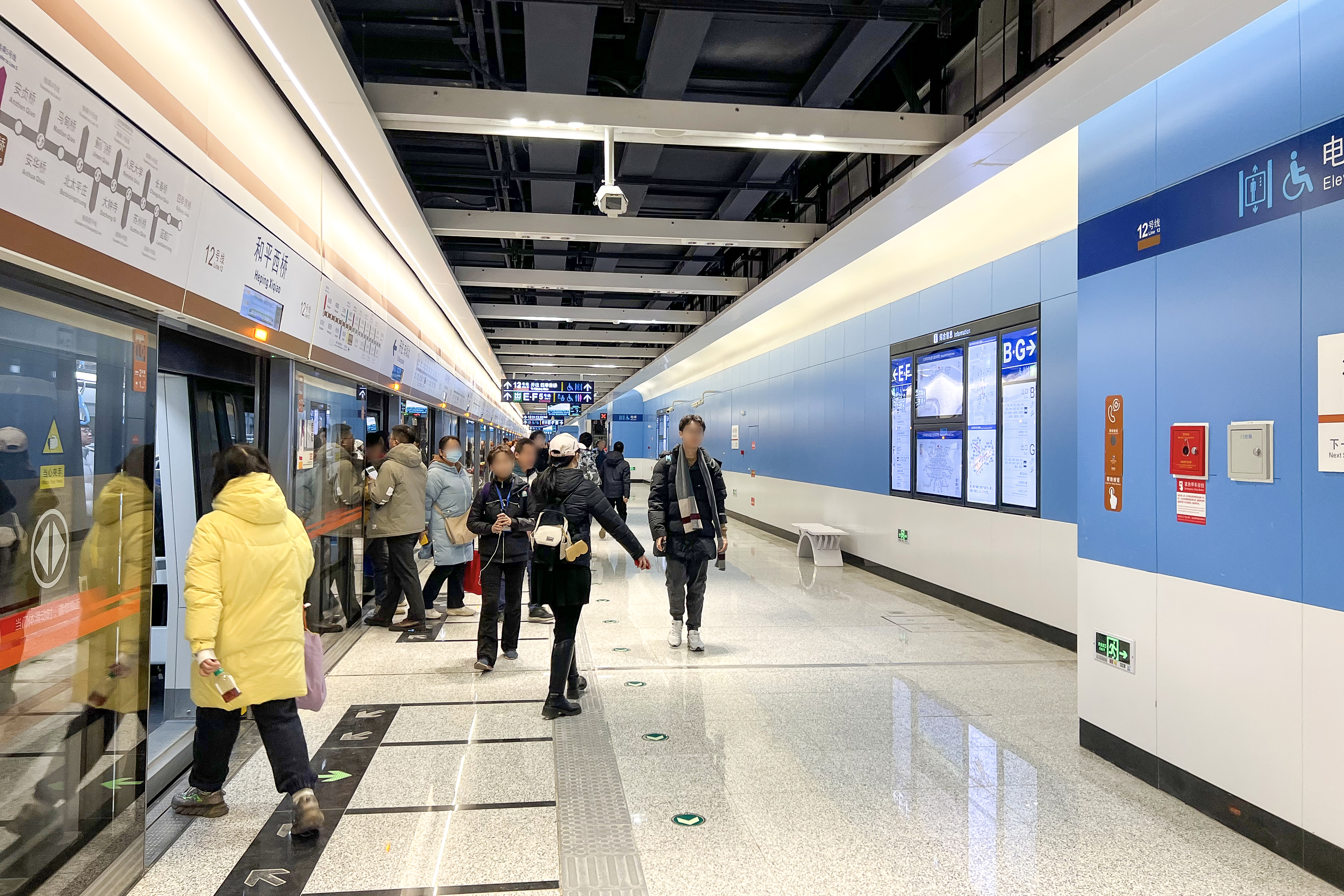
- Line 5 platform Line 12 platform

General information
- Location: North 3rd Ring Road at Heping West Bridge; Chaoyang District, Beijing; China
- Coordinates: 39°58′06″N 116°25′05″E
- Operator: Beijing Mass Transit Railway Operation Corporation Limited
- Lines: Line 5; Line 12
- Platforms: 4 (1 island platform and 1 split island platform)
- Tracks: 4

Construction
- Structure type: Underground
- Accessible: Yes

History
- Opened: Line 5: October 7, 2007; 18 years ago; Line 12: December 15, 2024; 20 months ago

Services
Preceding station	Beijing Subway	Following station
Huixin Xijie Nankou towards Tiantongyuanbei	Line 5	Hepingli Beijie towards Songjiazhuang
Anzhen Qiao towards Sijiqing Qiao	Line 12	Guangxi Men towards Dongbabei
Location
- Location within Beijing

Heping Xiqiao station (simplified Chinese: 和平西桥站; traditional Chinese: 和平西橋站; pinyin: Hépíng Xīqiáo Zhàn) is an interchange station between Line 5 and Line 12 of the Beijing Subway.

== Station layout ==
The station has an underground island platform for Line 5 and an underground split island platform for Line 12.

== Exits ==
There are 7 exits, lettered A, B, C, D, E, F and G. Exit A has an accessible stairlift.

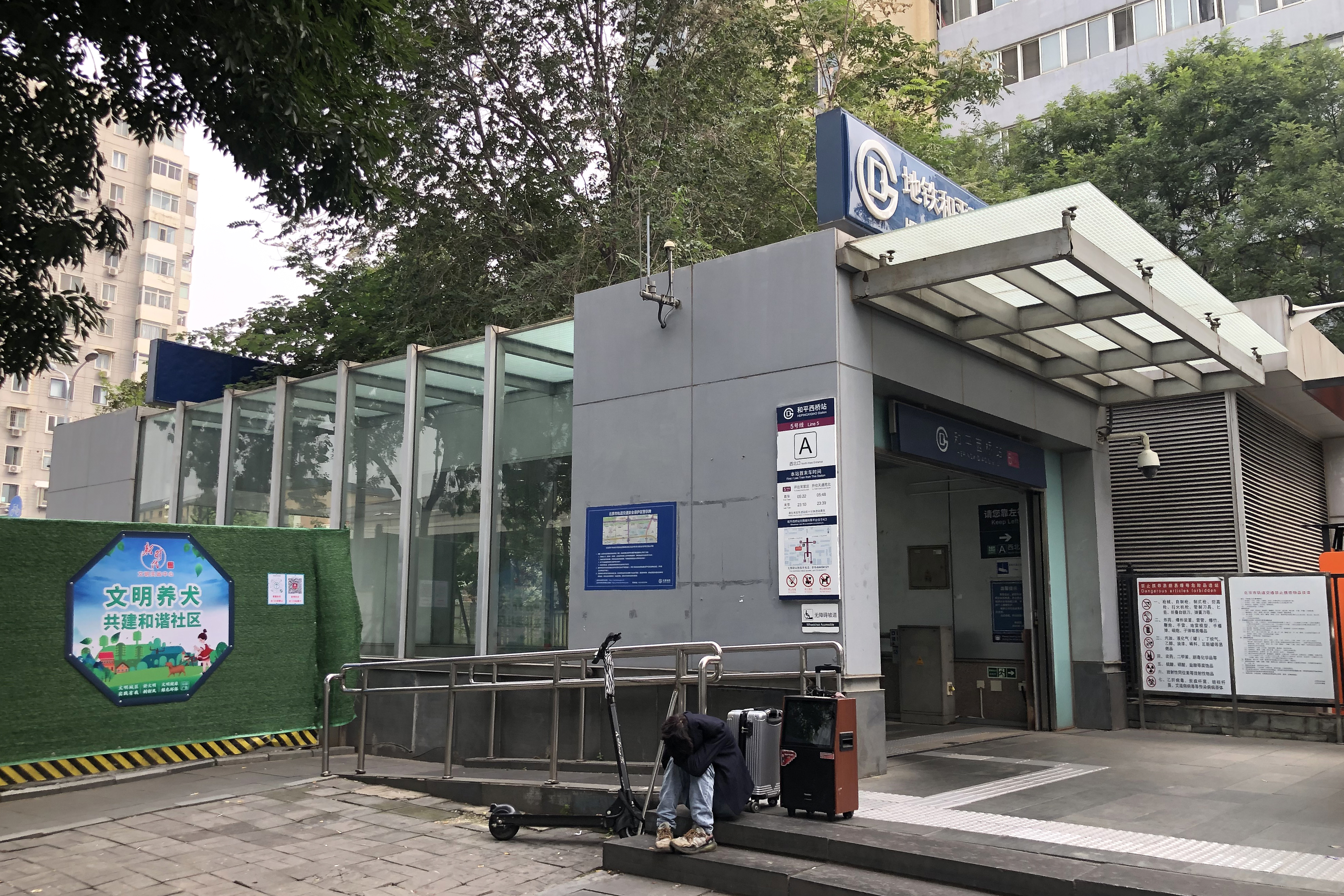
Exit A, Line 5

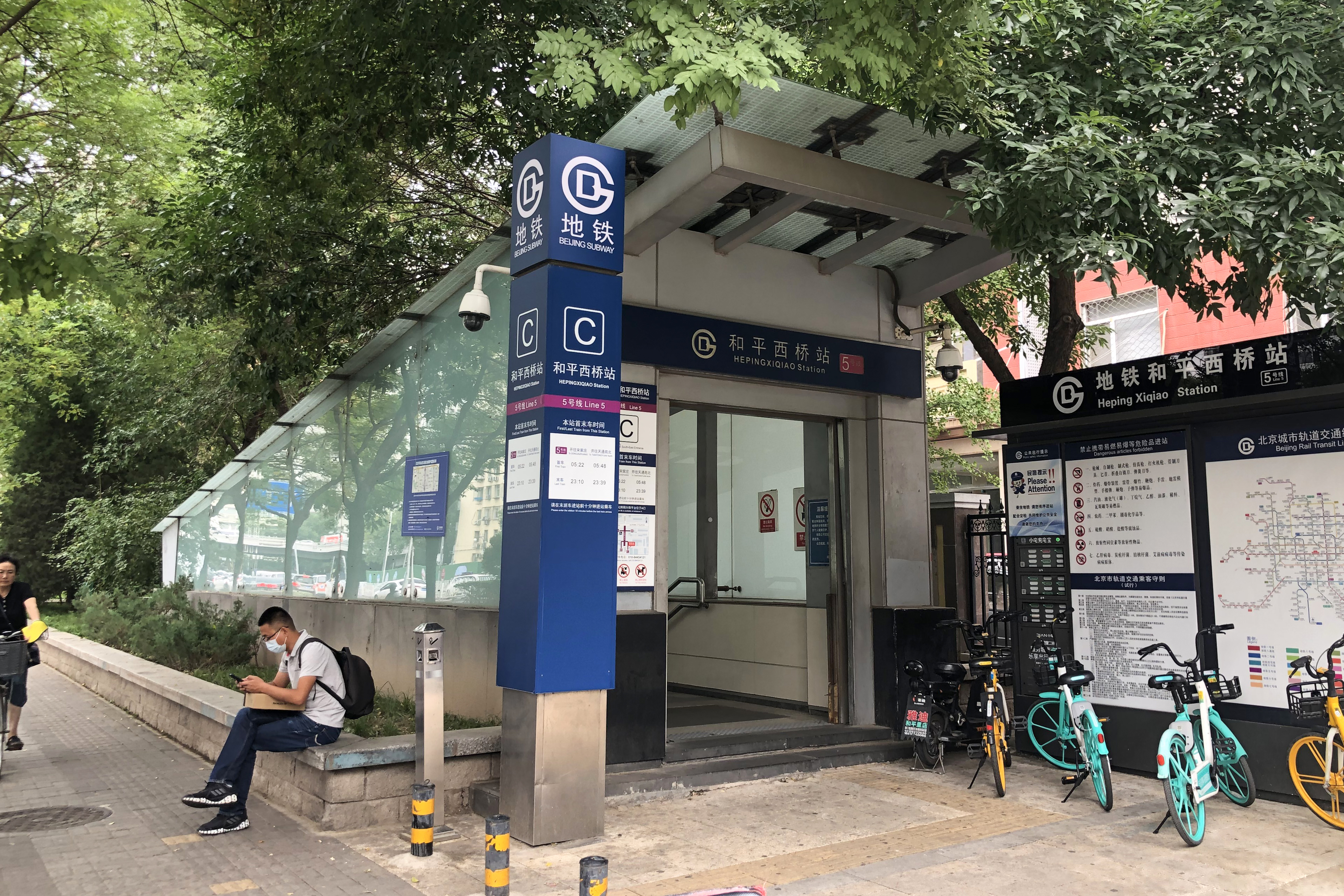
Exit C, Line 5

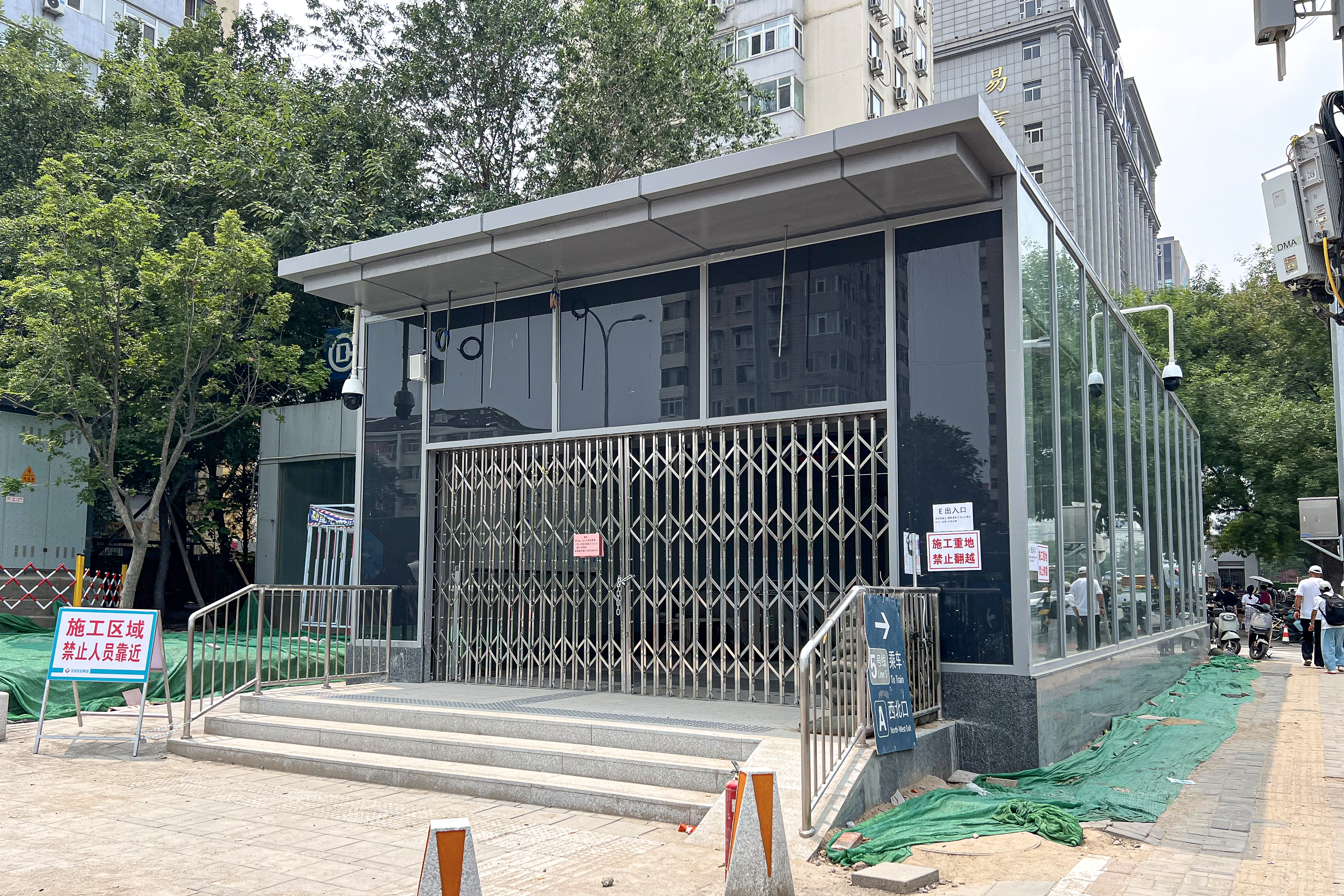
Exit E, Line 12

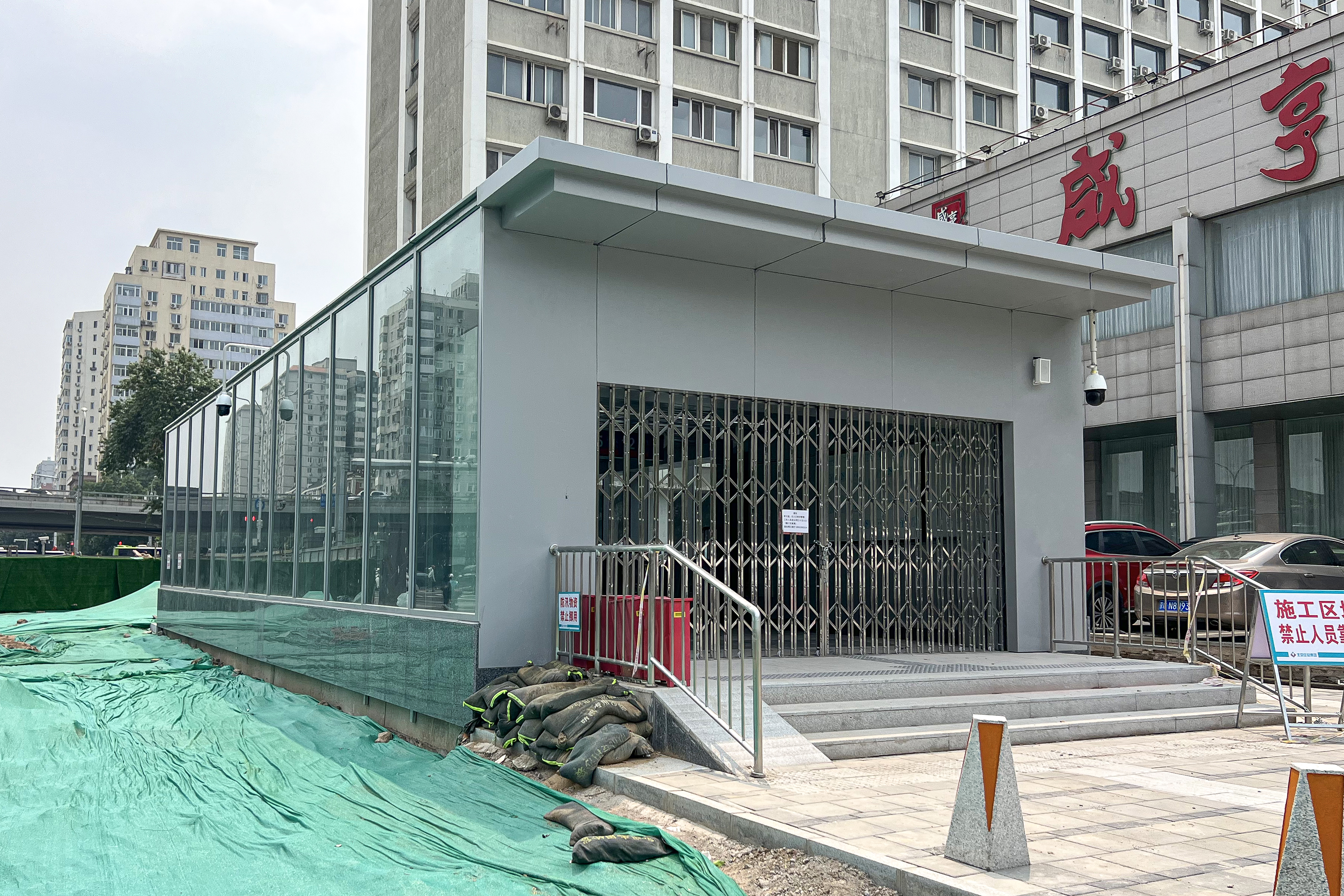
Exit F, Line 12

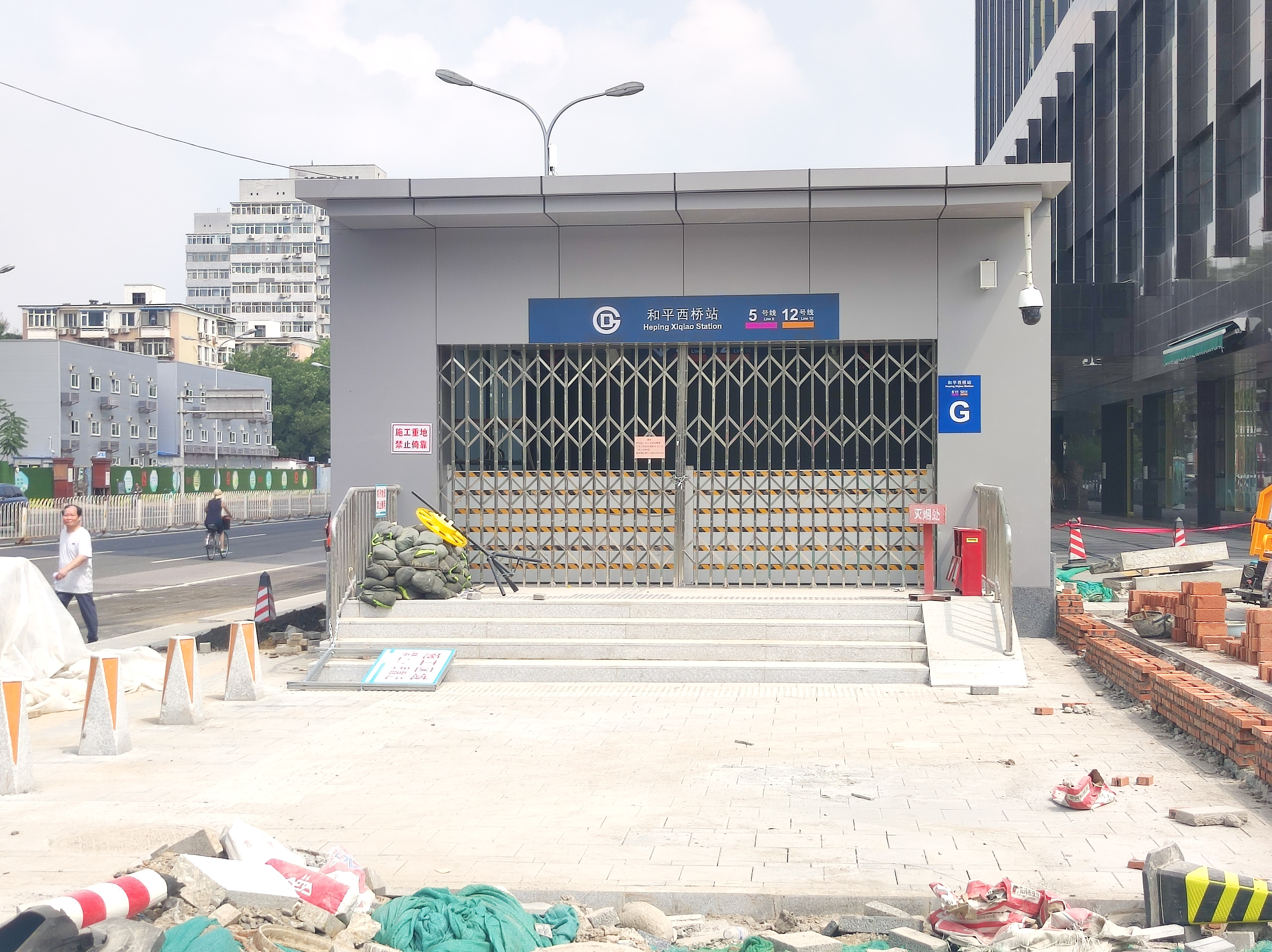
Exit G, Line 12

== Gallery ==
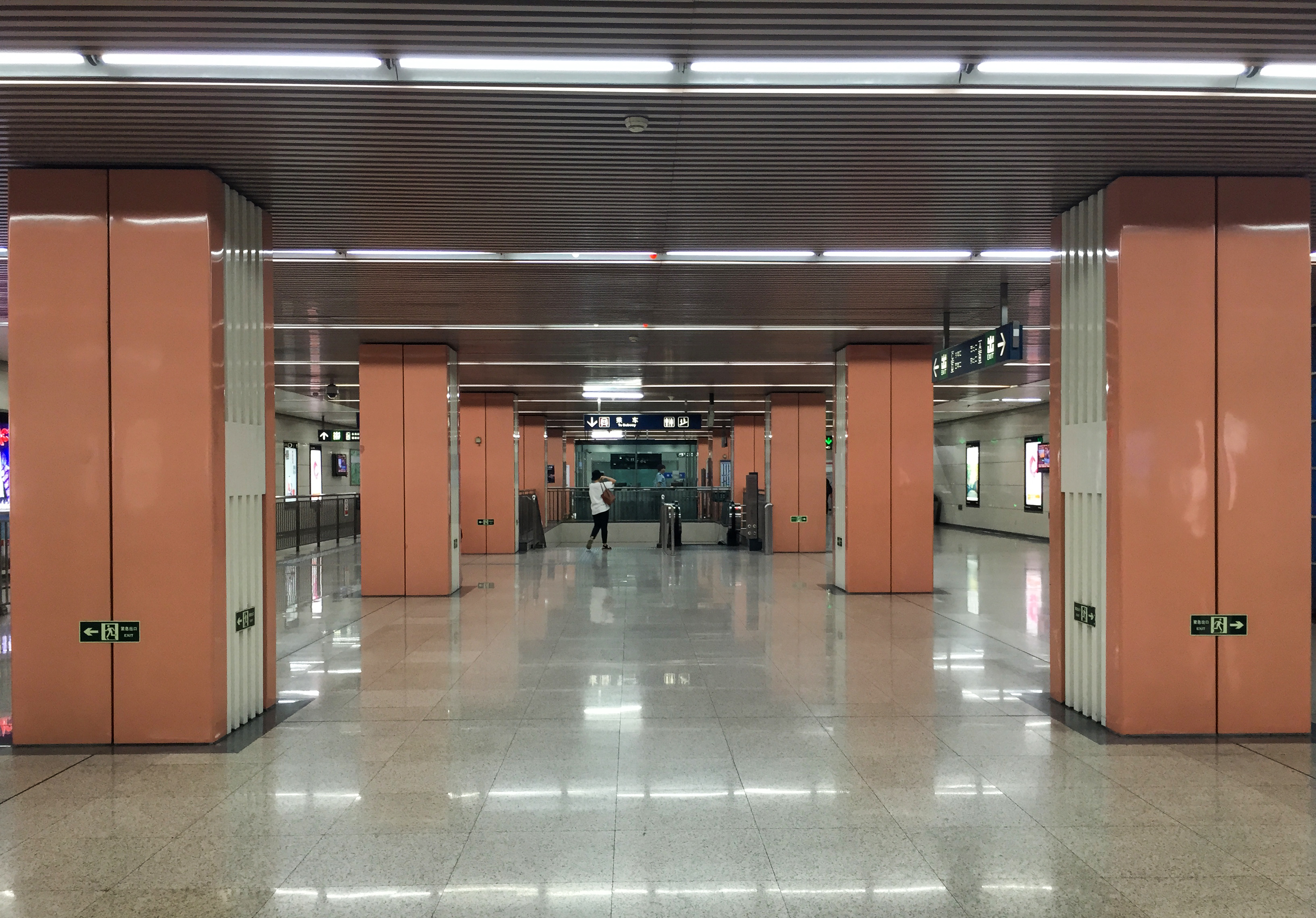
Concourse

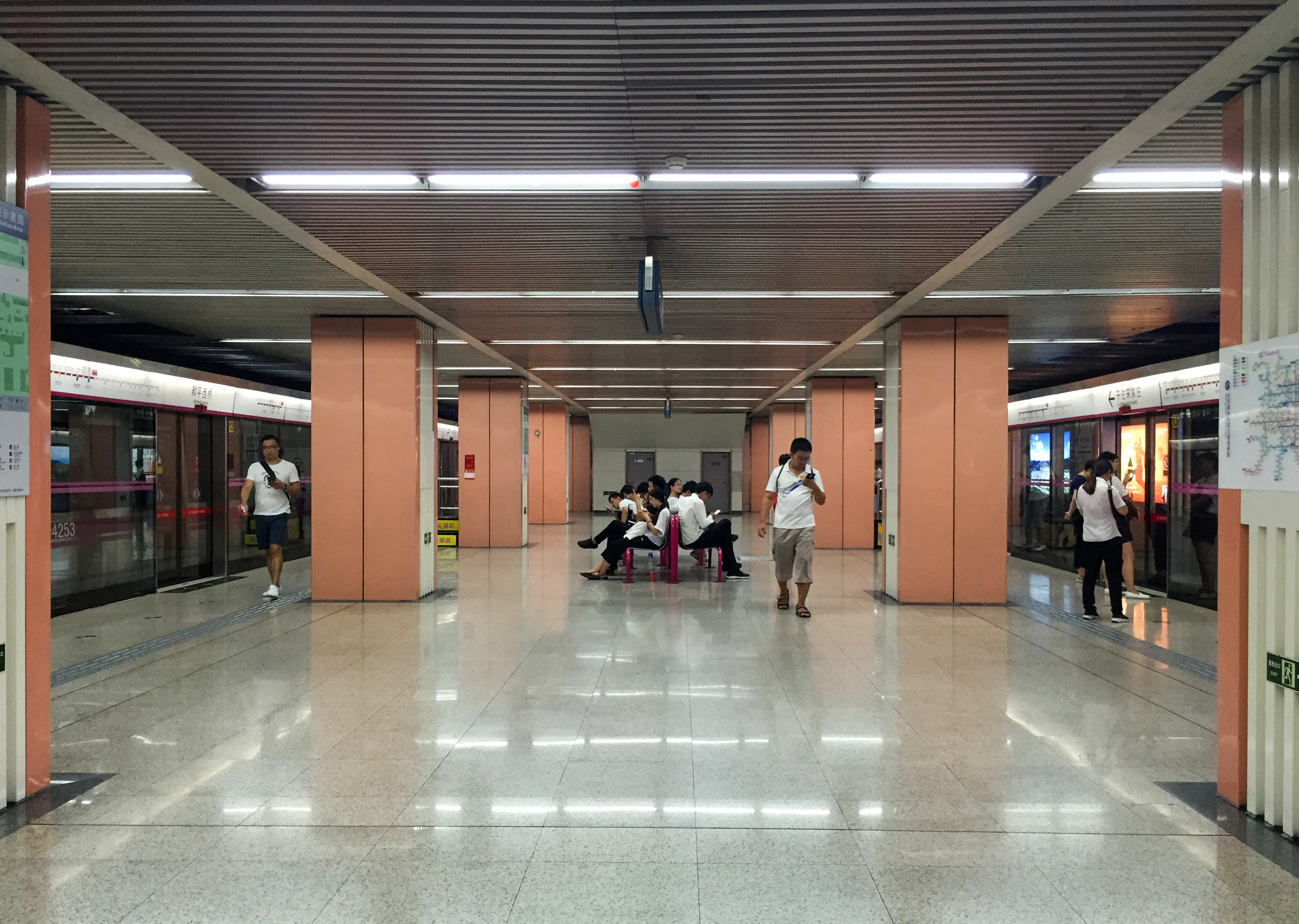
Platform

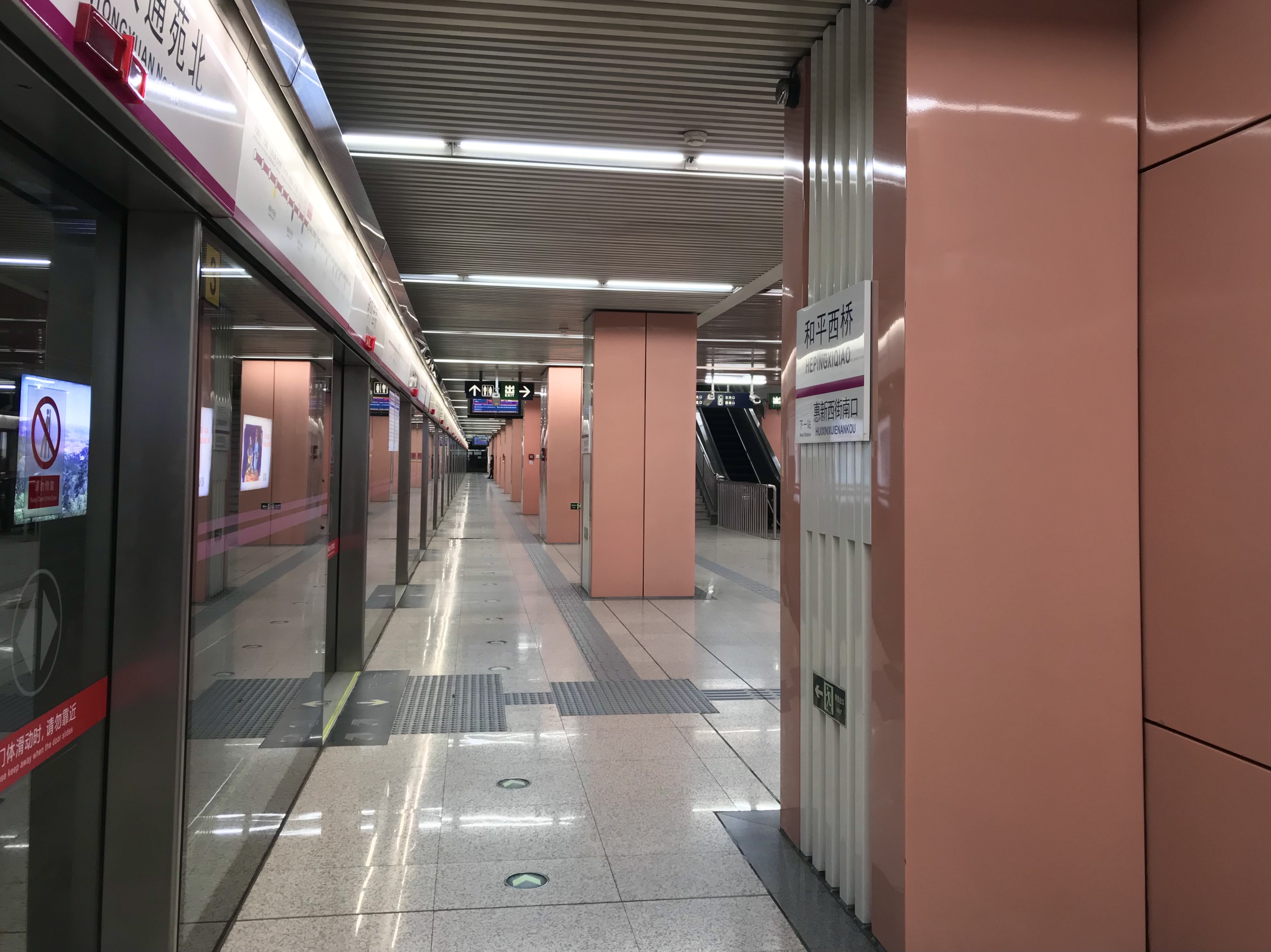
Platform (northbound side)

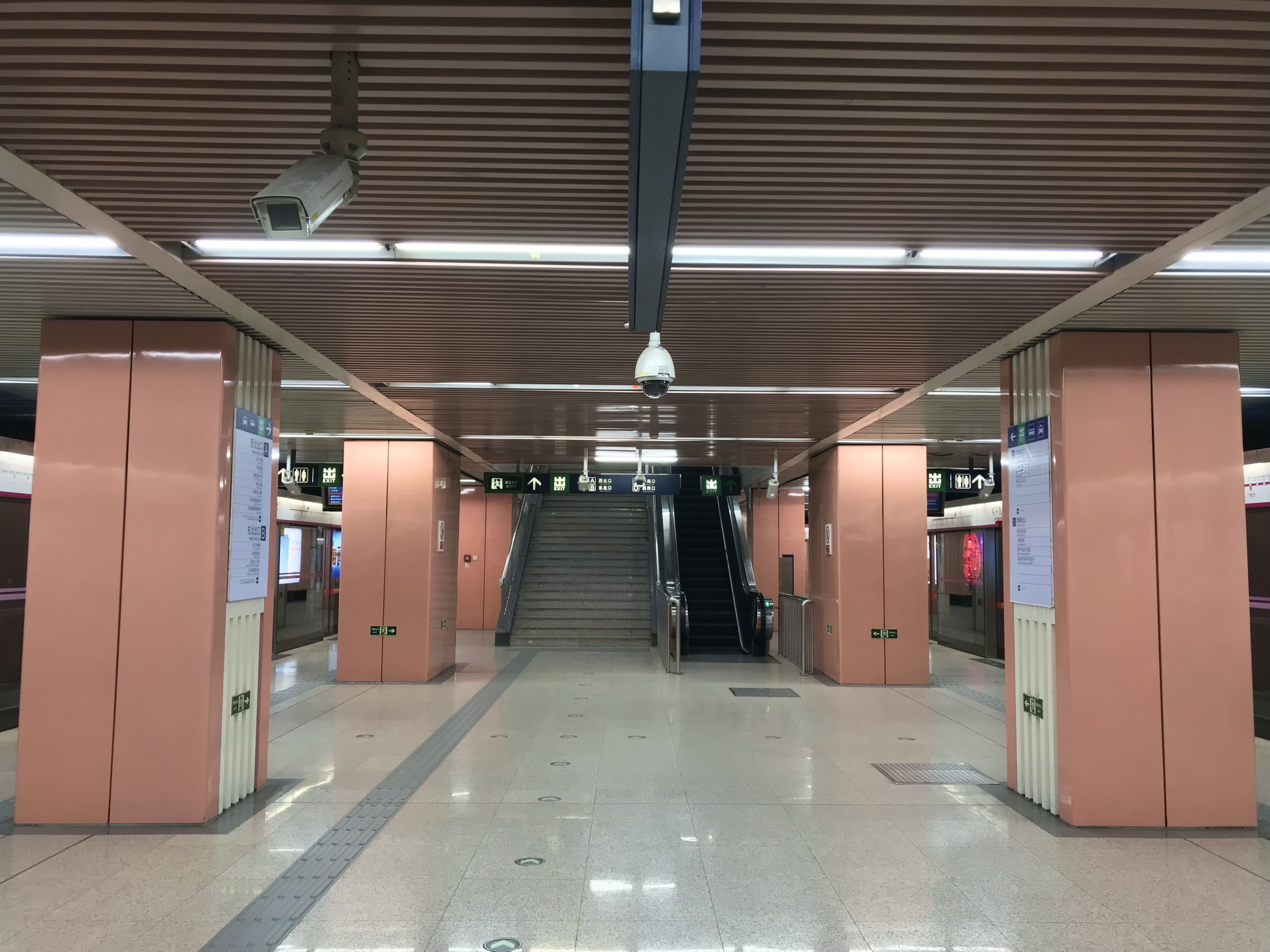
Platform (north-end)
