= Anzhen Qiao station =

Beijing Subway Line 12 station

Anzhen Qiao 安贞桥
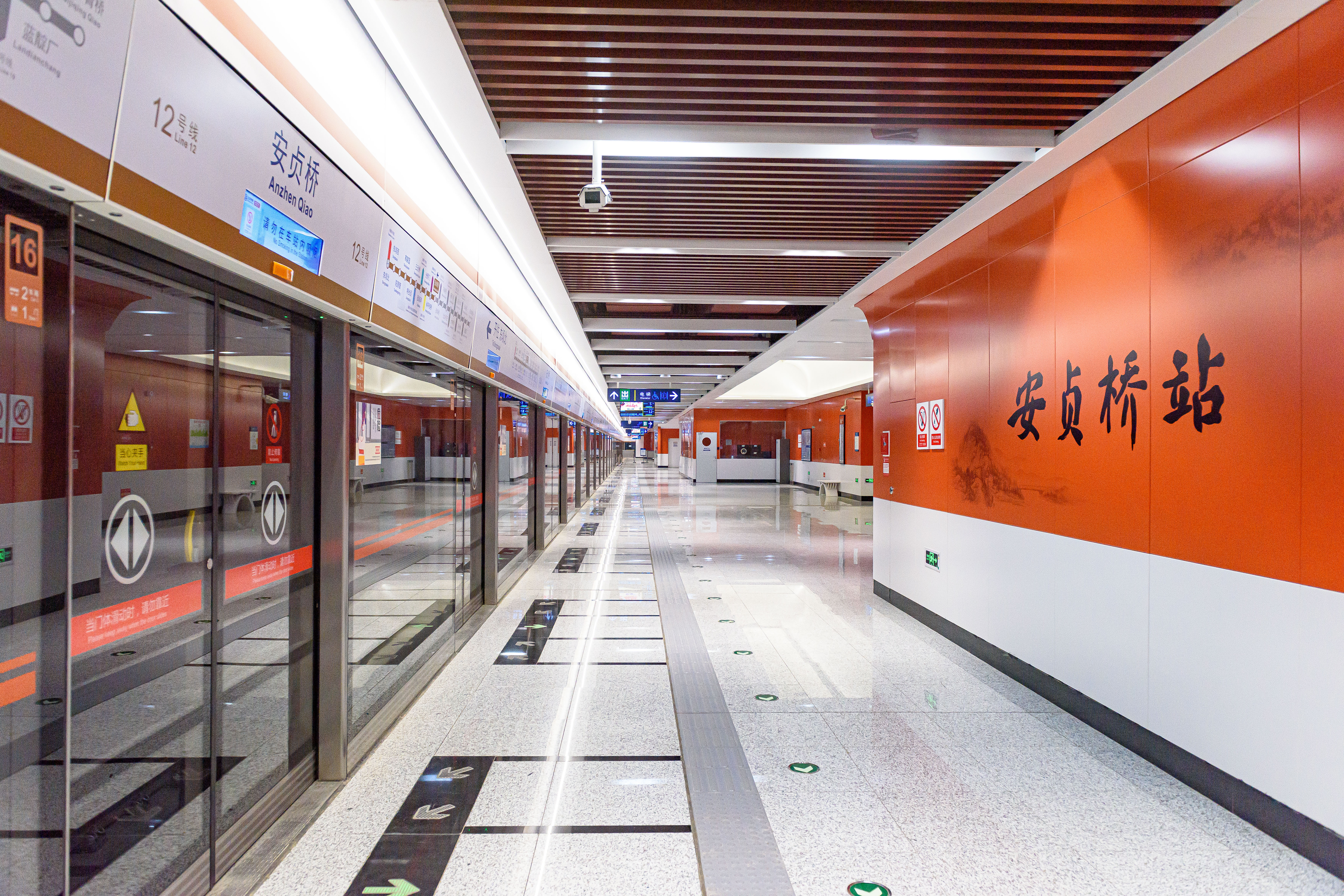
- Eastbound platform (towards Dongbabei)

Chinese name
- Simplified Chinese: 安贞桥站
- Traditional Chinese: 安貞橋站
Transcriptions
Standard Mandarin
- Hanyu Pinyin: Ānzhēn Qiáo zhàn

General information
- Location: Anzhen Bridge, at the intersection of North 3rd Ring Road East, Andingmen Outer Street (安定门外大街) and Anding Road (安定路); On the border between Anzhen Subdistrict in Dongcheng District and Hepingli Subdistrict in Chaoyang District, Beijing; China
- Coordinates: 39°58′02″N 116°24′04″E
- Operator: Beijing Mass Transit Railway Operation Corporation Limited
- Line: Line 12
- Platforms: 2 (1 split island platform)
- Tracks: 2

Construction
- Structure type: Underground
- Accessible: Yes

History
- Opened: December 15, 2024; 20 months ago

Services
Preceding station	Beijing Subway	Following station
Anhua Qiao towards Sijiqing Qiao	Line 12	Heping Xiqiao towards Dongbabei
Location
- Location within Beijing

Anzhen Qiao station (simplified Chinese: 安贞桥站; traditional Chinese: 安貞橋站; pinyin: Ānzhēn Qiáo zhàn) is a station on Line 12 of the Beijing Subway. It opened on December 15, 2024.

== Location ==
The station is located under the North 3rd Ring Road East at the intersection of Andingmen Outer Street and Anding Road under Anzhen Bridge. It is on the border between Anzhen Subdistrict in Dongcheng District and Hepingli Subdistrict in Chaoyang District.

== Station features ==
The station has an underground split island platform.

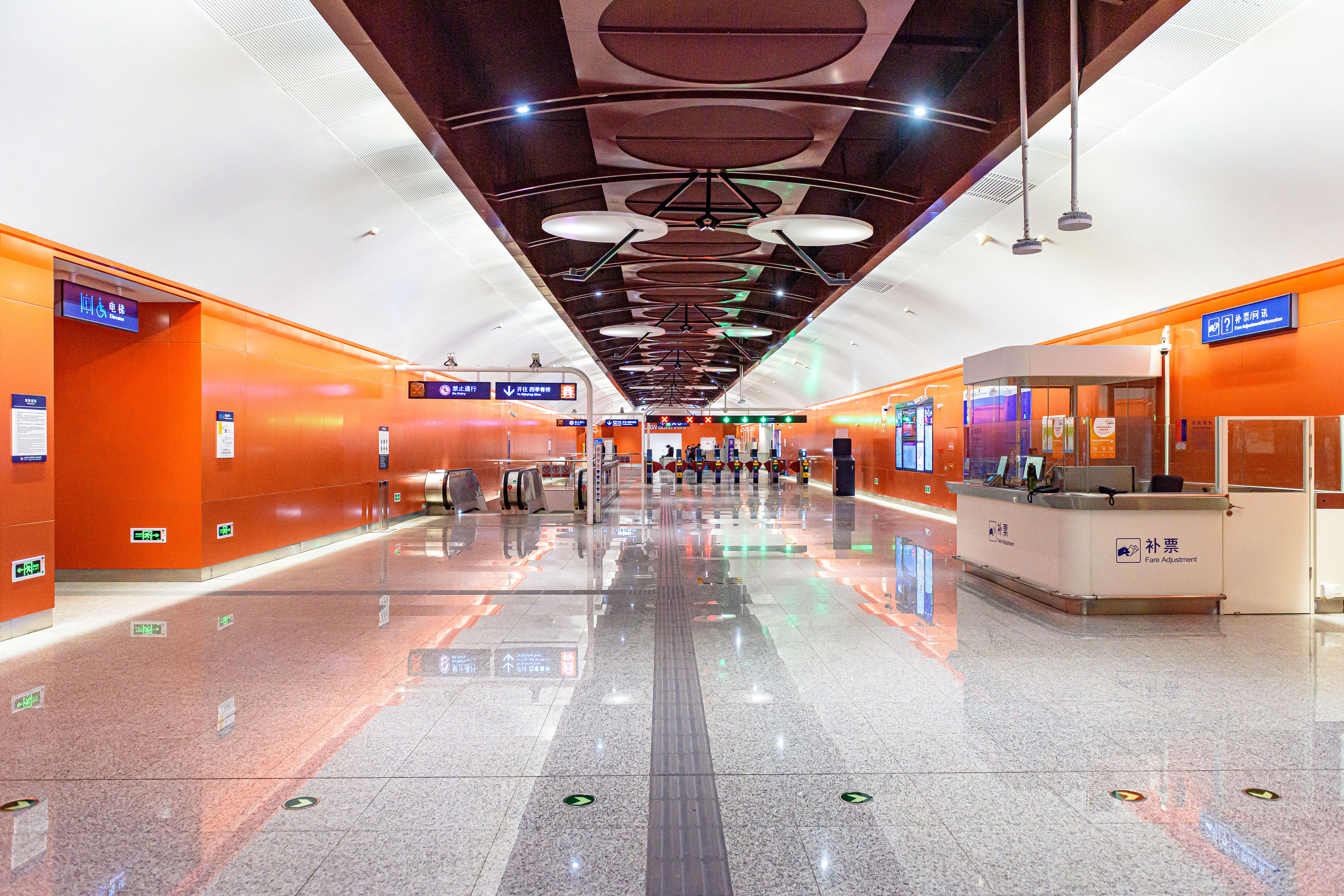
North concourse

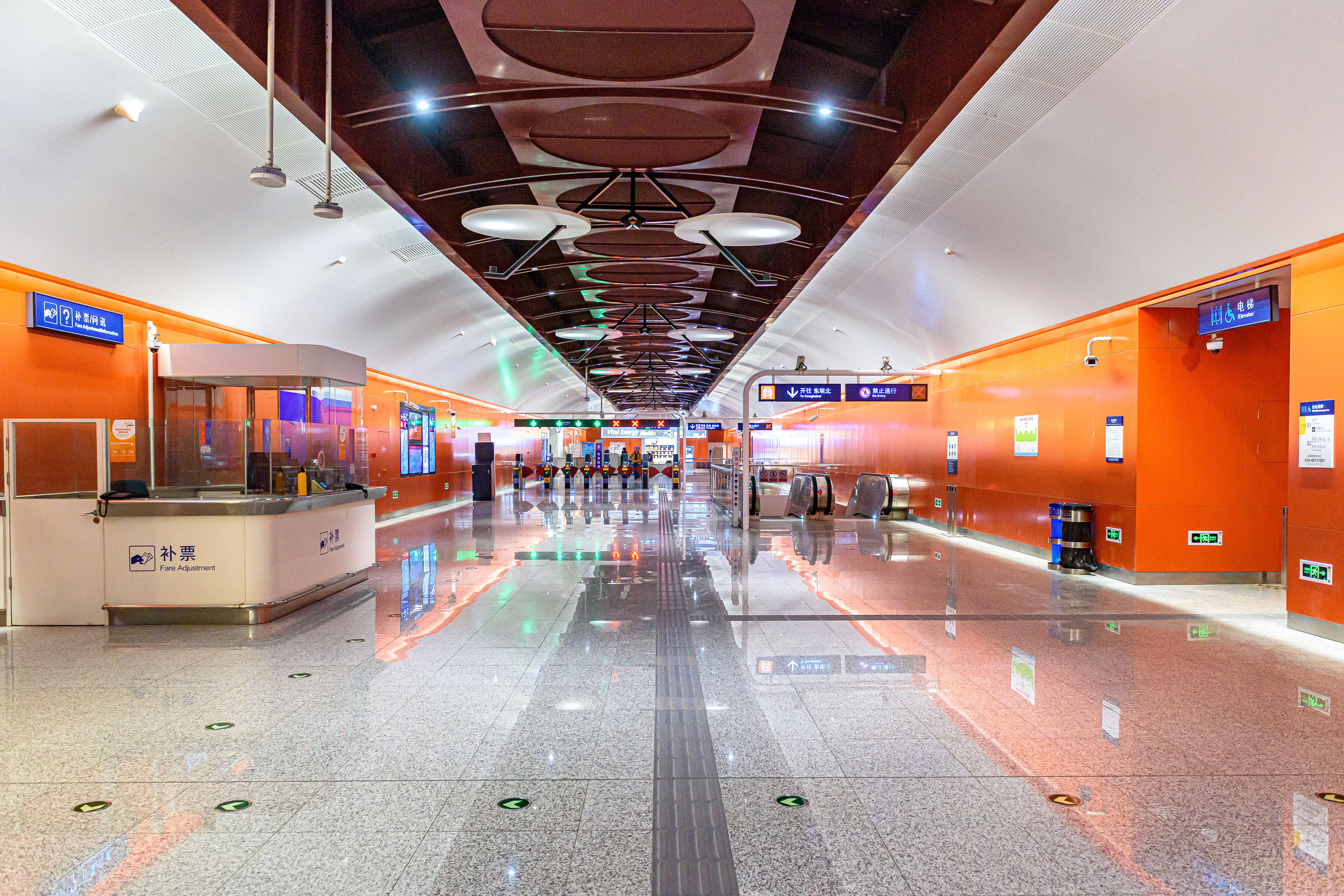
South concourse

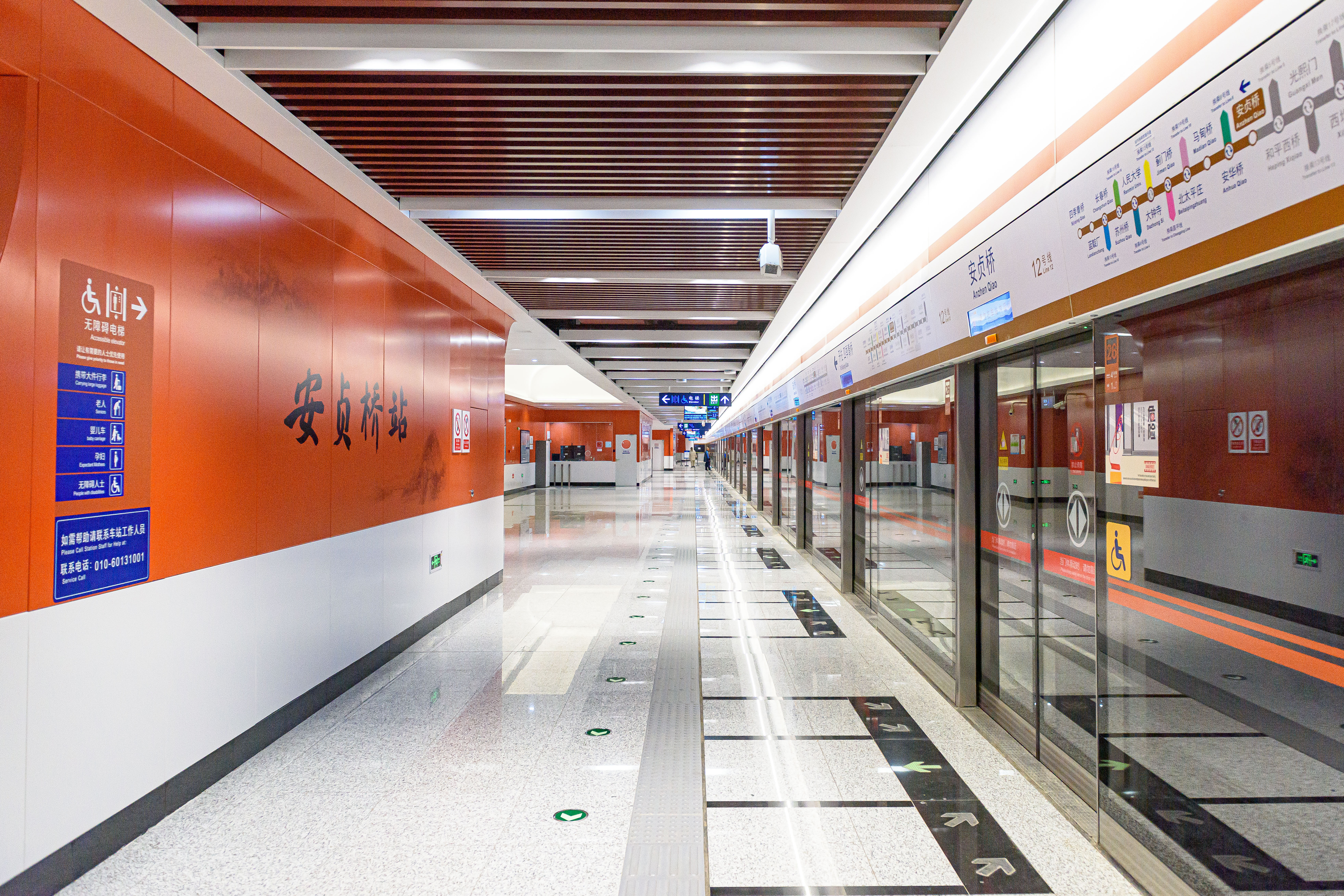
Platform (towards Sijiqing Qiao)

== Exits ==
There are 4 exits, lettered A, B, C and D. Exits A and C have accessible elevators. Exit C also has a direct passageway to the Sheraton Jinyu Hotel and the Global Trade Center, but it has not yet been completed.

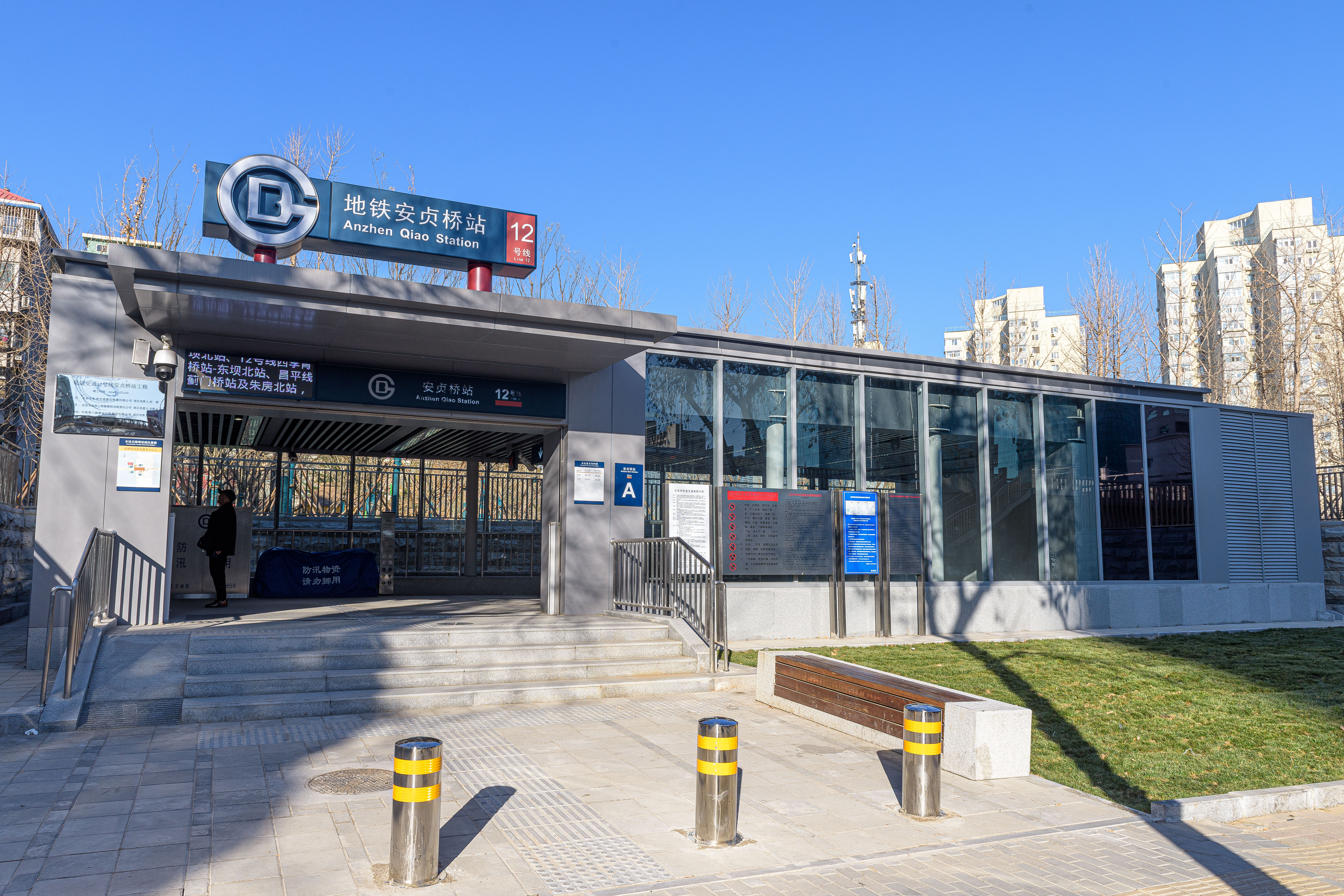
Exit A

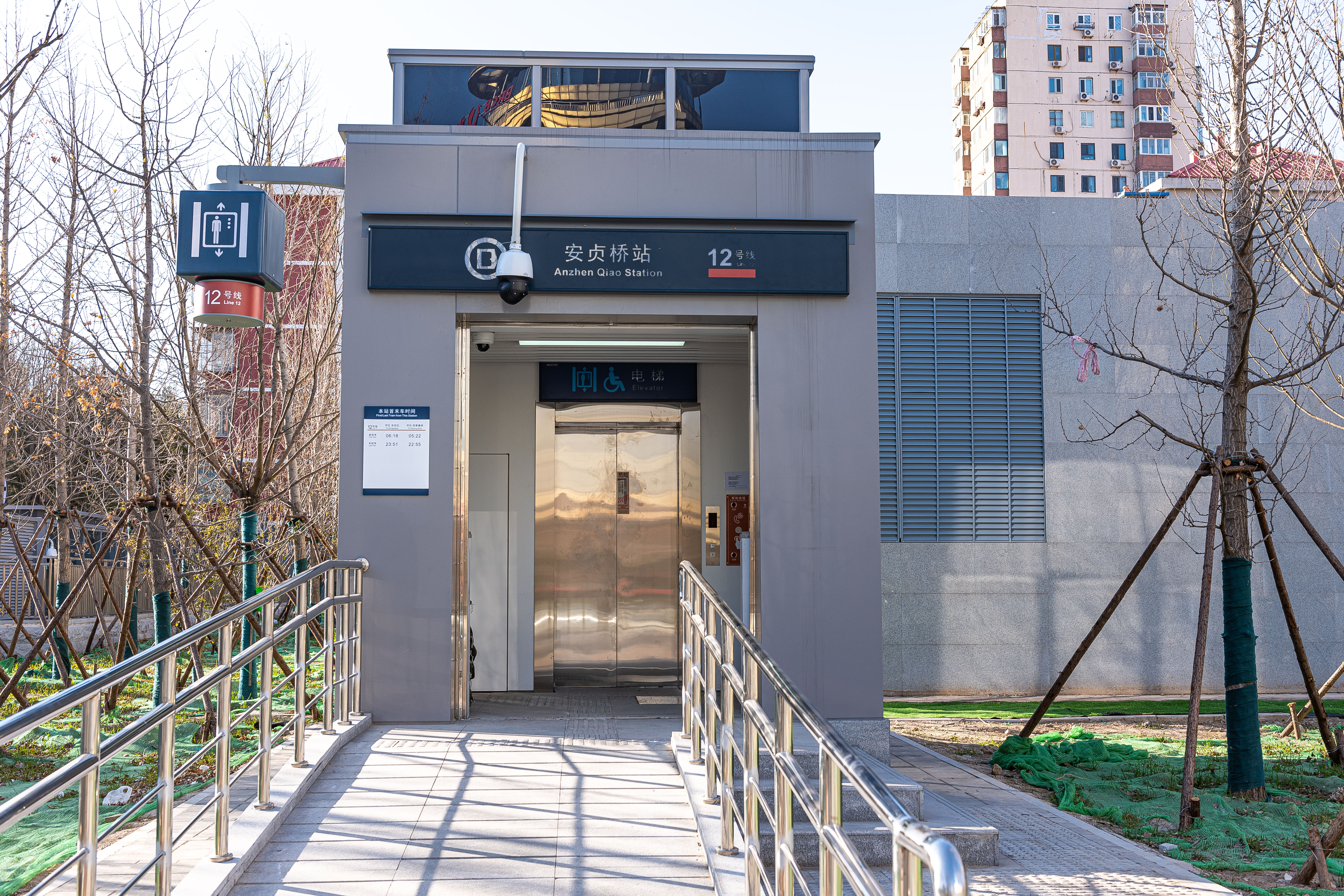
Exit A accessible exit

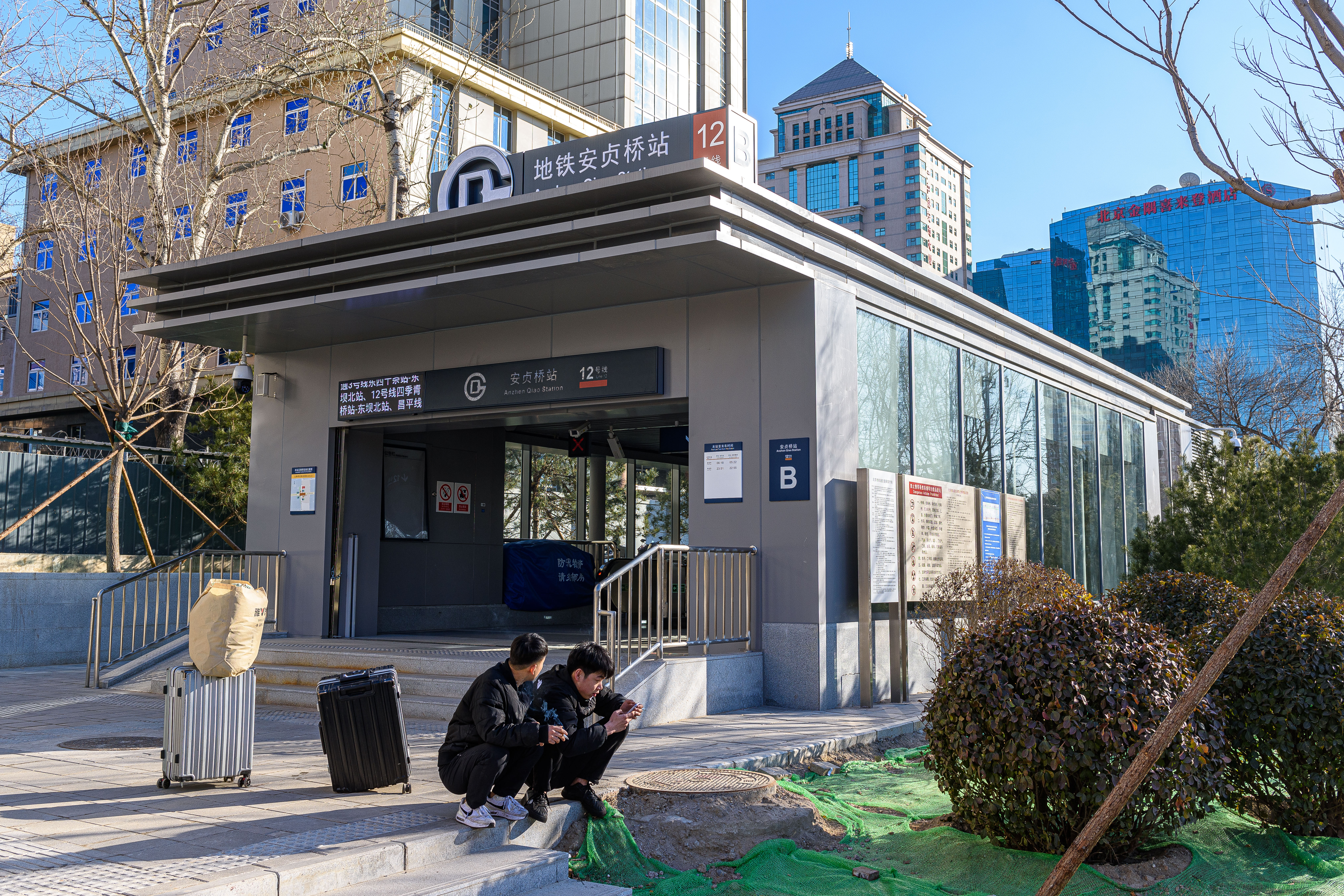
Exit B

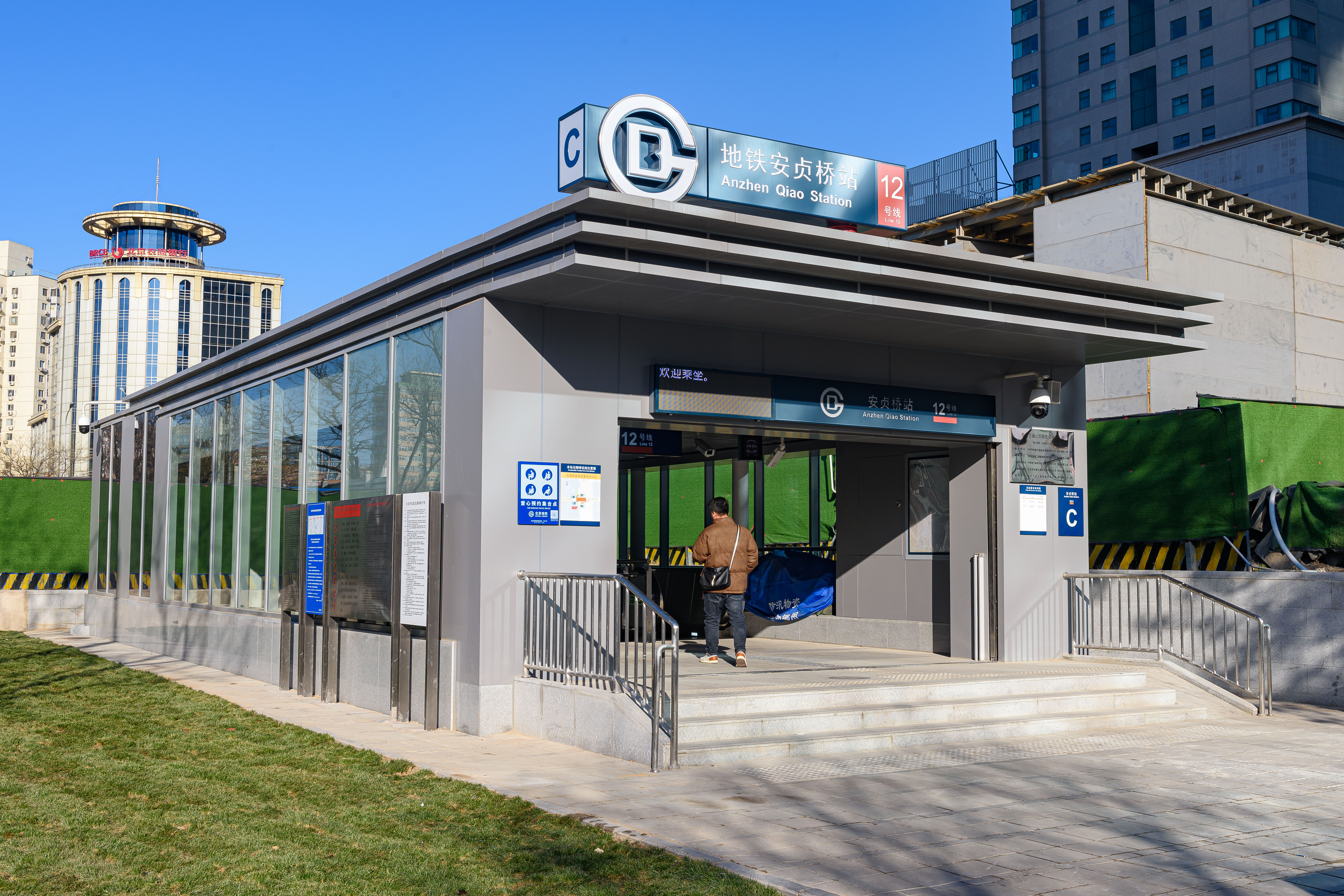
Exit C

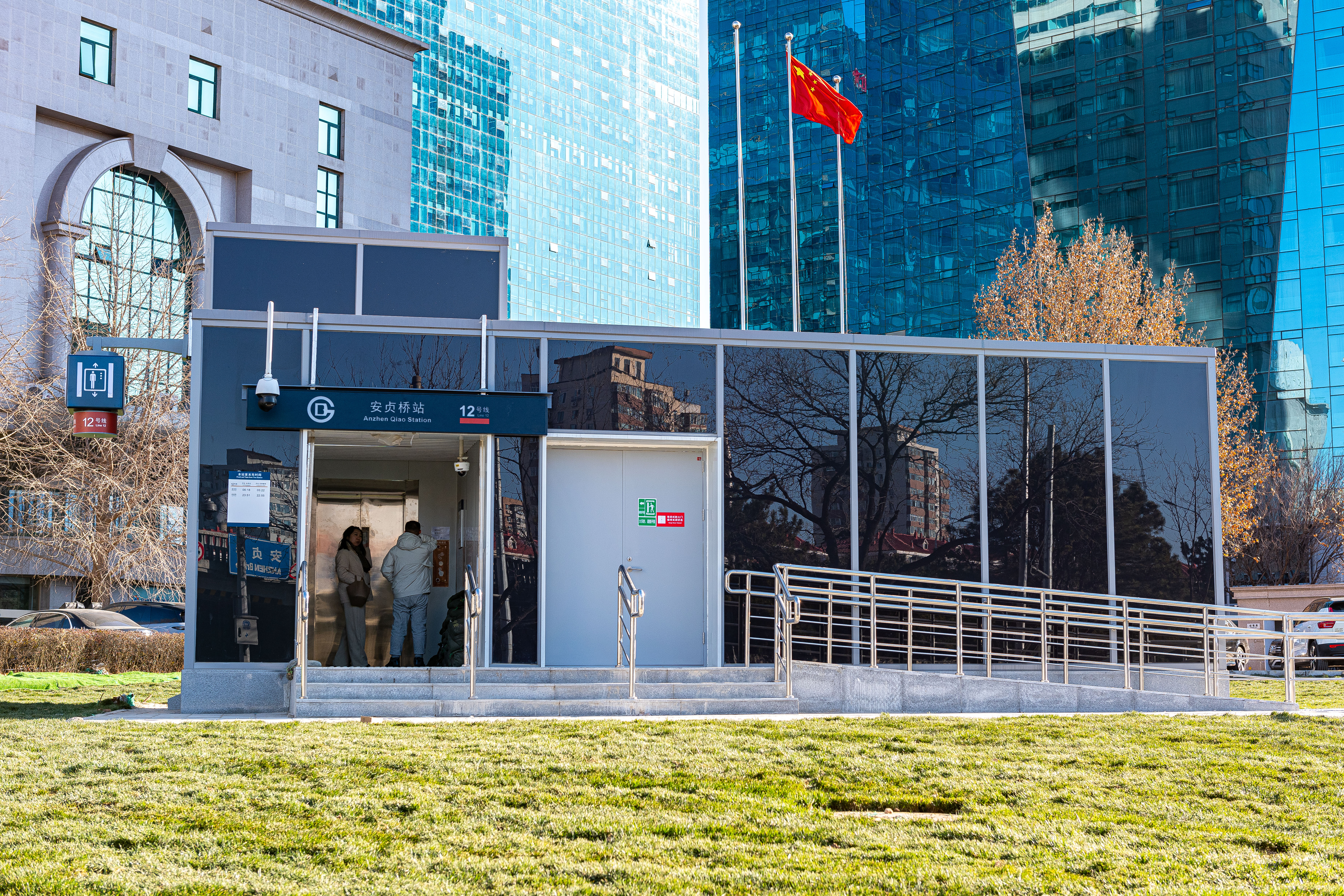
Exit C accessible exit

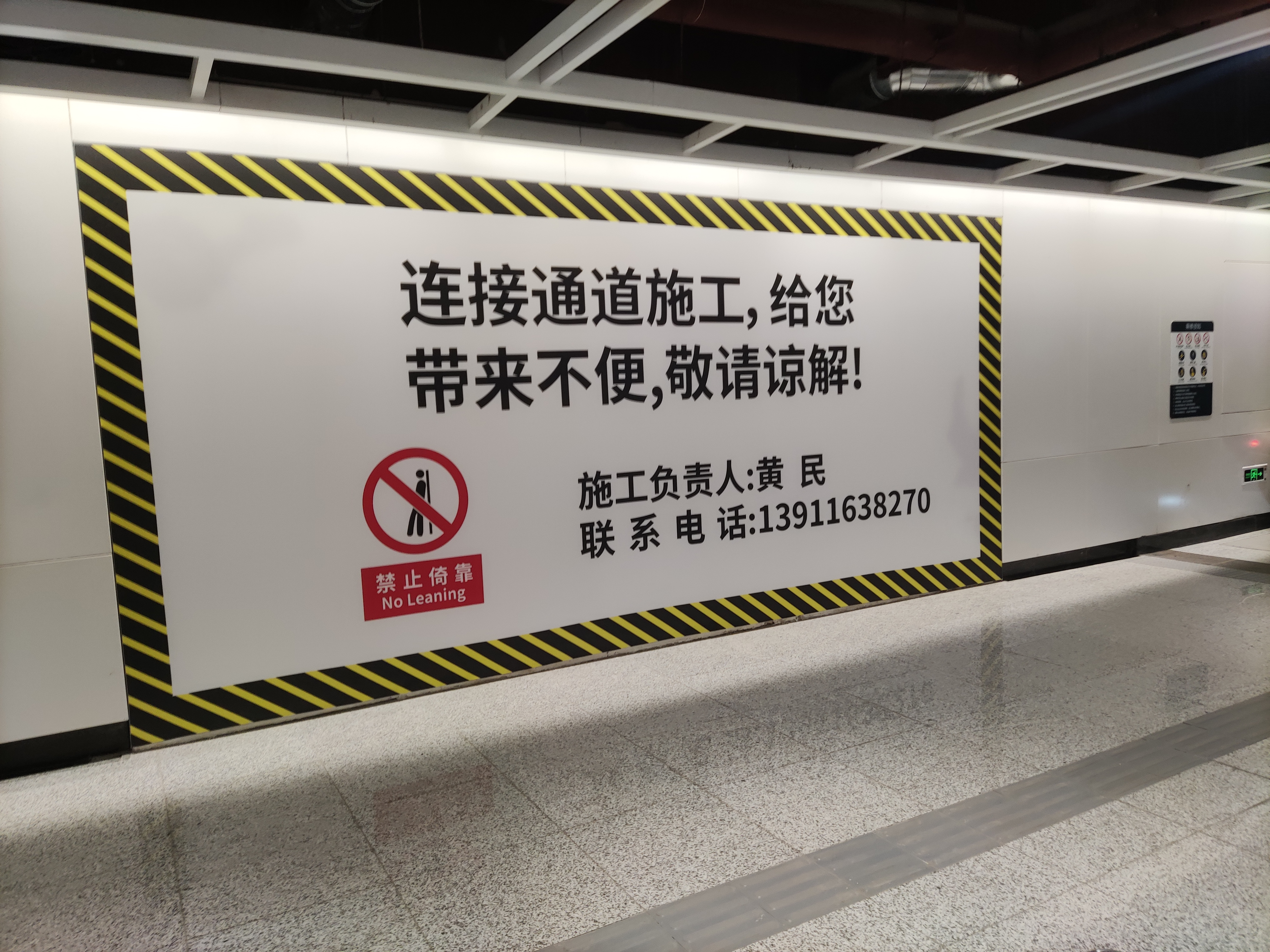
Exit C passageway to Sheraton Jinyu Hotel and Global Trade Center (under construction)

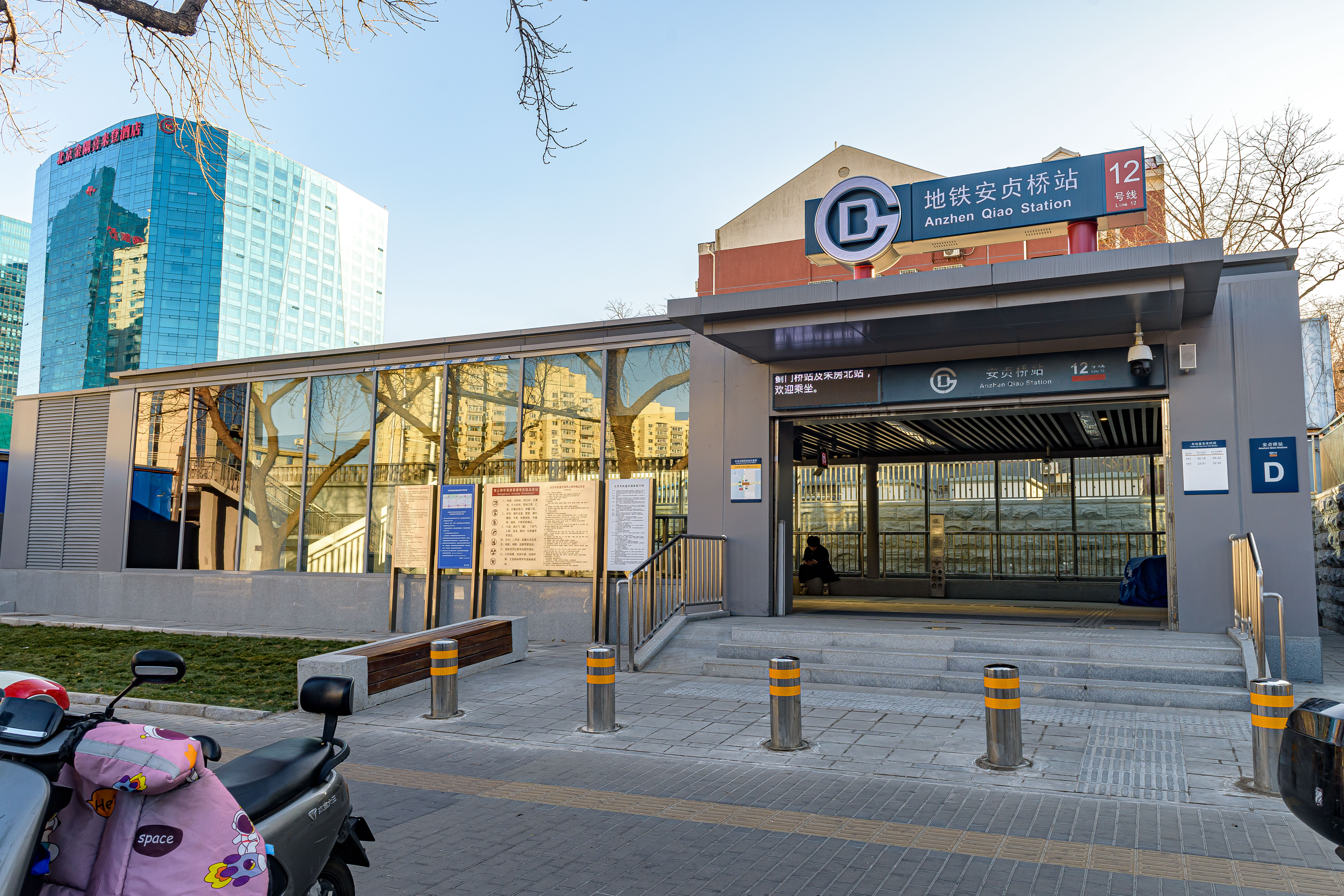
Exit D
