= Hepingli Beijie station =

Beijing Subway station

Coordinates: 39.9587°N 116.4185°E

Hepingli Beijie 和平里北街
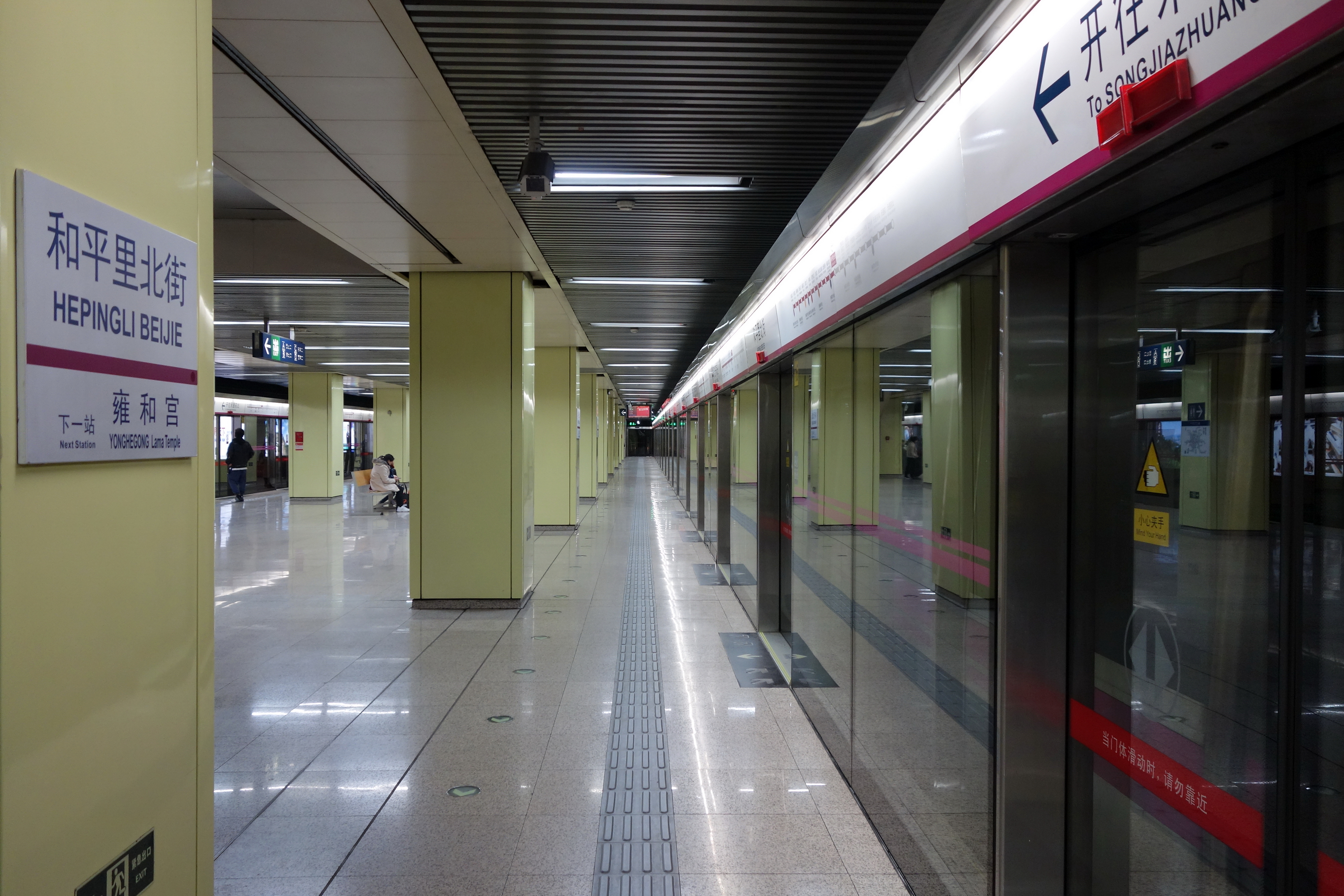
- Platform

General information
- Location: Hepingli West Street (和平里西街) and Hepingli North Street (和平里北街); Dongcheng District, Beijing; China
- Operator: Beijing Mass Transit Railway Operation Corporation Limited
- Line: Line 5
- Platforms: 2 (1 island platform)
- Tracks: 2

Construction
- Structure type: Underground
- Accessible: Yes

History
- Opened: October 7, 2007

Services
Preceding station	Beijing Subway	Following station
Heping Xiqiao towards Tiantongyuanbei	Line 5	Yonghegong Lama Temple towards Songjiazhuang
Location
- Location within Beijing

Hepingli Beijie Station (Chinese: 和平里北街站; pinyin: Hépínglǐ Běijiē Zhàn) is a station on Line 5 of the Beijing Subway.

== Station layout ==
The station has an underground island platform.

== Exits ==
There are 5 exits, lettered A1, A2, B, C, and D. Exits A2, B, and C are accessible.
