= Dazhong Si station =

Beijing Subway Line 12 and Line 13 station

Coordinates: 39.966612°N 116.345139°E

Dazhong Si 大钟寺
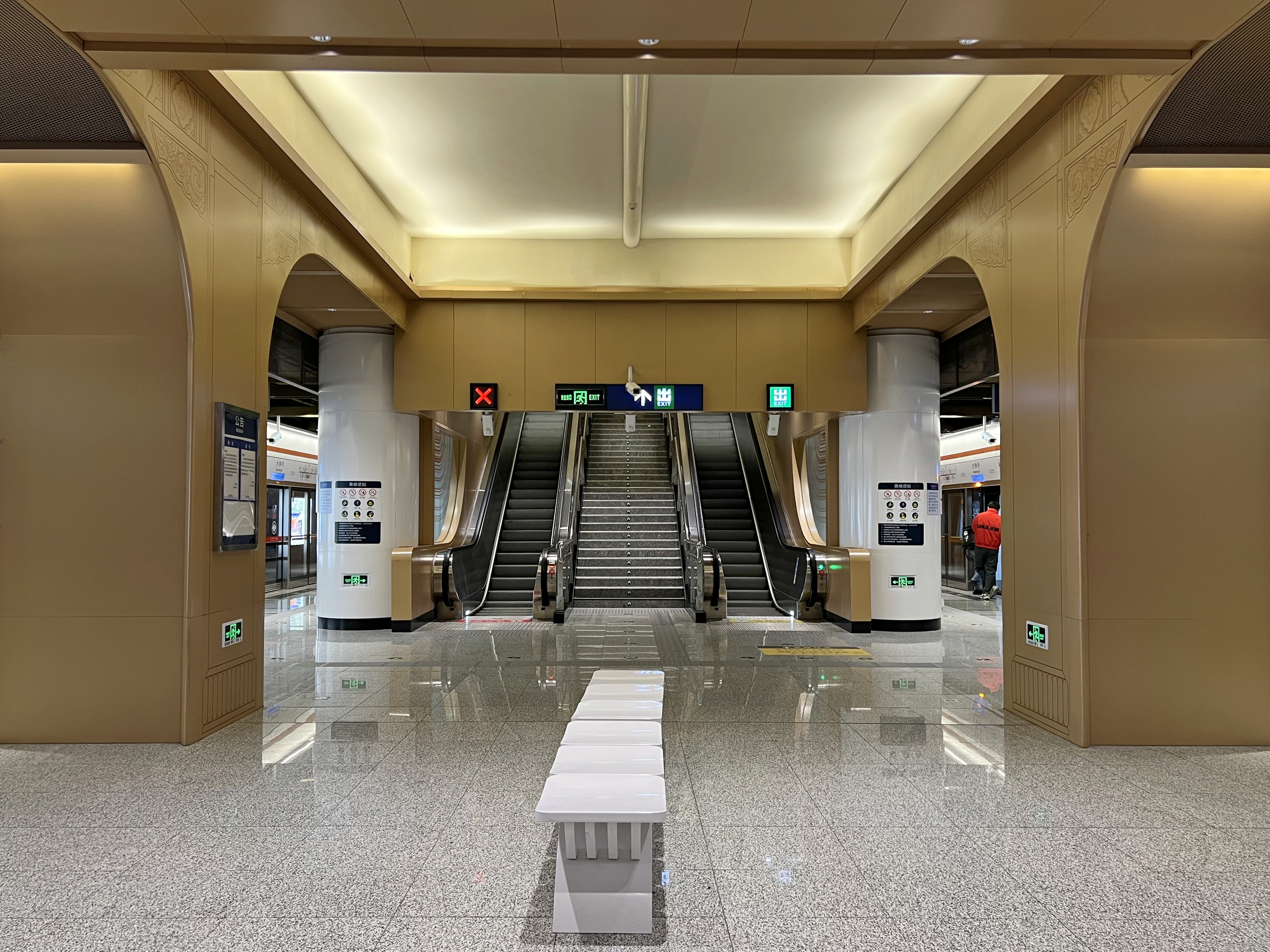
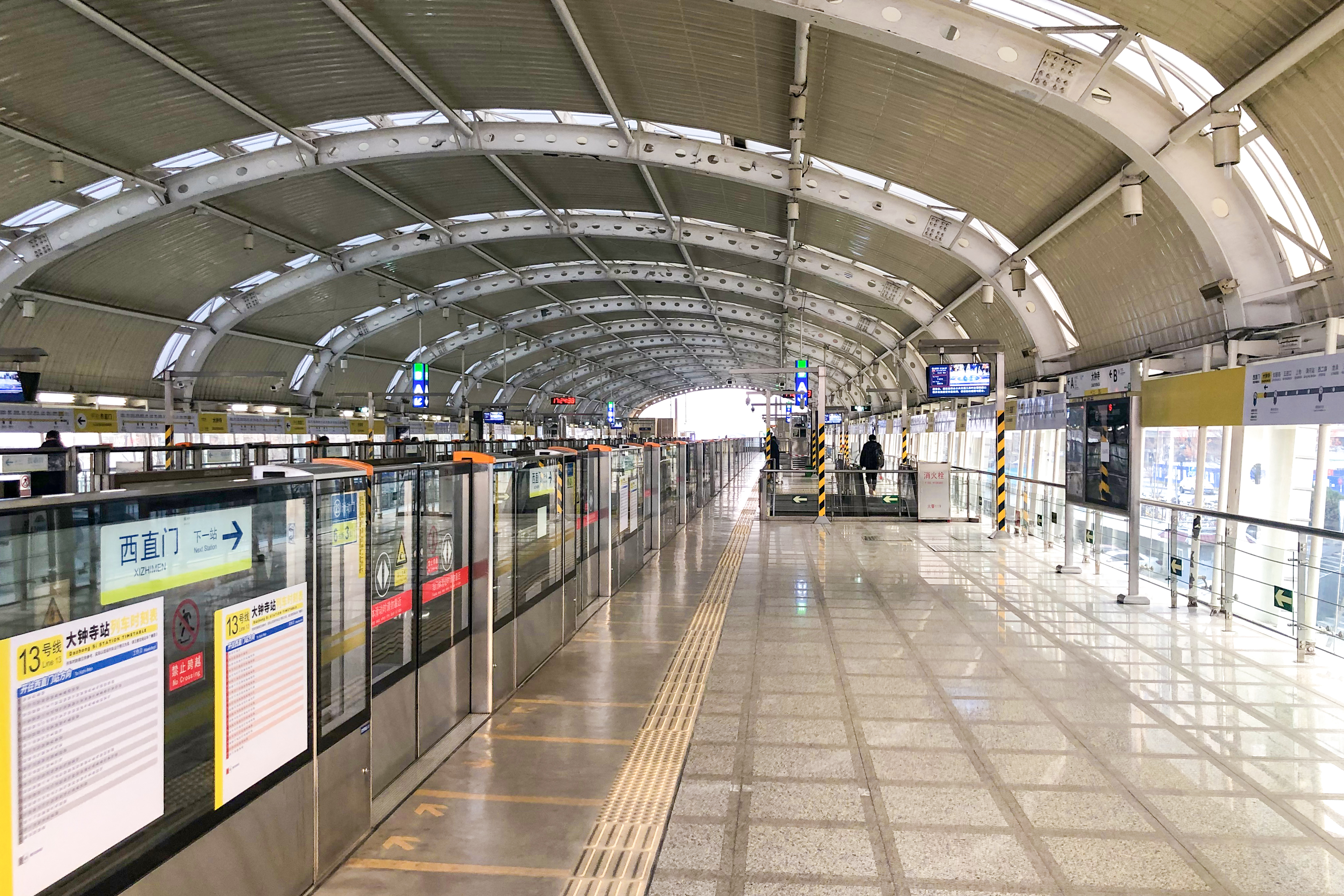
- Line 12 platform Line 13 platform

General information
- Location: North 3rd Ring Road and Mingguang West Road (明光西路); Haidian District, Beijing; China
- Operator: Beijing Mass Transit Railway Operation Corporation Limited
- Lines: Line 12; Line 13
- Platforms: 4 (1 split island platform on Line 12 and 2 side platforms on Line 13)
- Tracks: 4

Construction
- Structure type: Elevated (Line 13); Underground (Line 12)
- Accessible: Yes

Other information
- Station code: 1302

History
- Opened: Line 13: September 28, 2002; 23 years ago; Line 12: December 15, 2024; 20 months ago

Services
Preceding station	Beijing Subway	Following station
Renmin Univ. towards Sijiqing Qiao	Line 12	Jimen Qiao towards Dongbabei
Xizhimen Terminus	Line 13	Zhichun Lu towards Dongzhimen
Location
- Location within Beijing

Dazhong Si station (simplified Chinese: 大钟寺站; traditional Chinese: 大鐘寺站; pinyin: Dàzhōng Sì zhàn; lit. 'Big Bell Temple station') is an interchange station between Line 12 and Line 13 of the Beijing Subway. It is named after the Big Bell Temple.

The station currently is an out-of-system interchange (OSI) between the lines. The in-system transfer passage is expected to be completed in December 2027 in tandem with the Line 13 upgrading project which will extend the length of the platform to support 8-car trains.

== Station layout ==
=== Line 13 ===
The station has 2 elevated side platforms.

=== Line 12 ===
The station has an underground split island platform.

== Exits ==
The Line 12 station and Line 13 station are actually two separated stations, similar to Muxidi station on Lines 1 and 16.

=== Line 13 ===
There are 2 exits, lettered A and B. Both are accessible.

=== Line 12 ===
There are 2 exits, lettered D and E. Both are accessible.

== Gallery ==
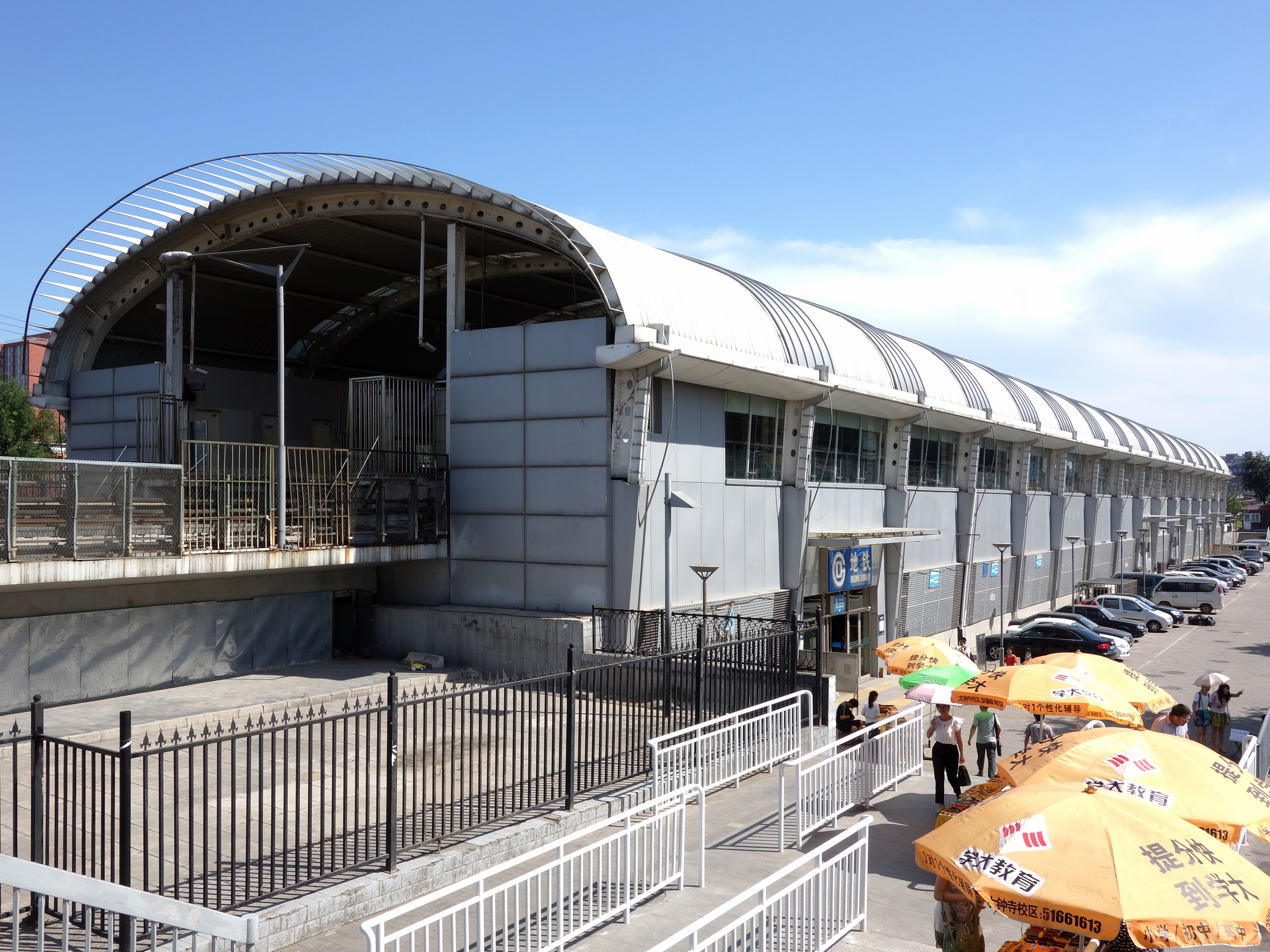
Line 13 Exterior

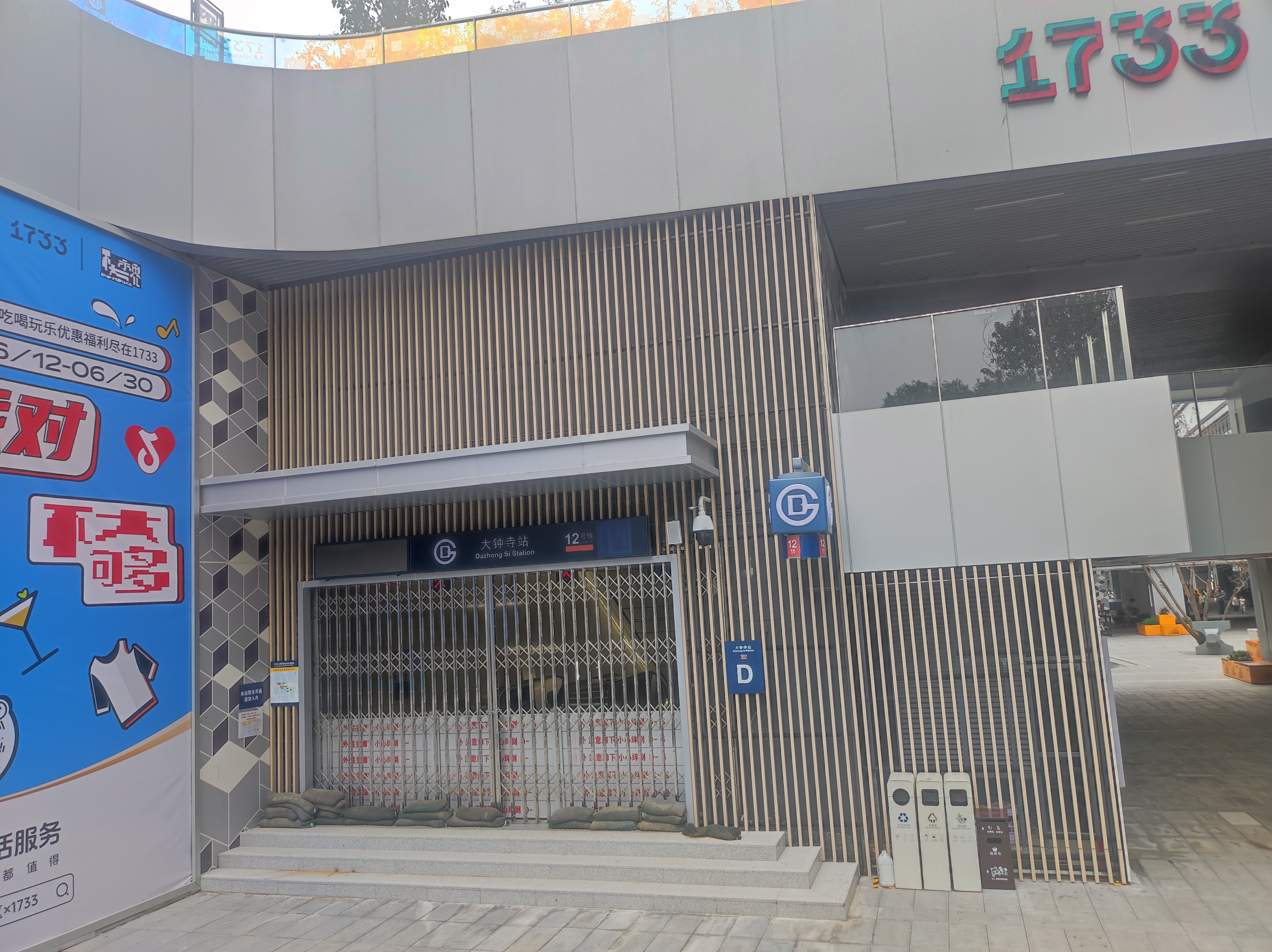
Exit D of Dazhong Si station

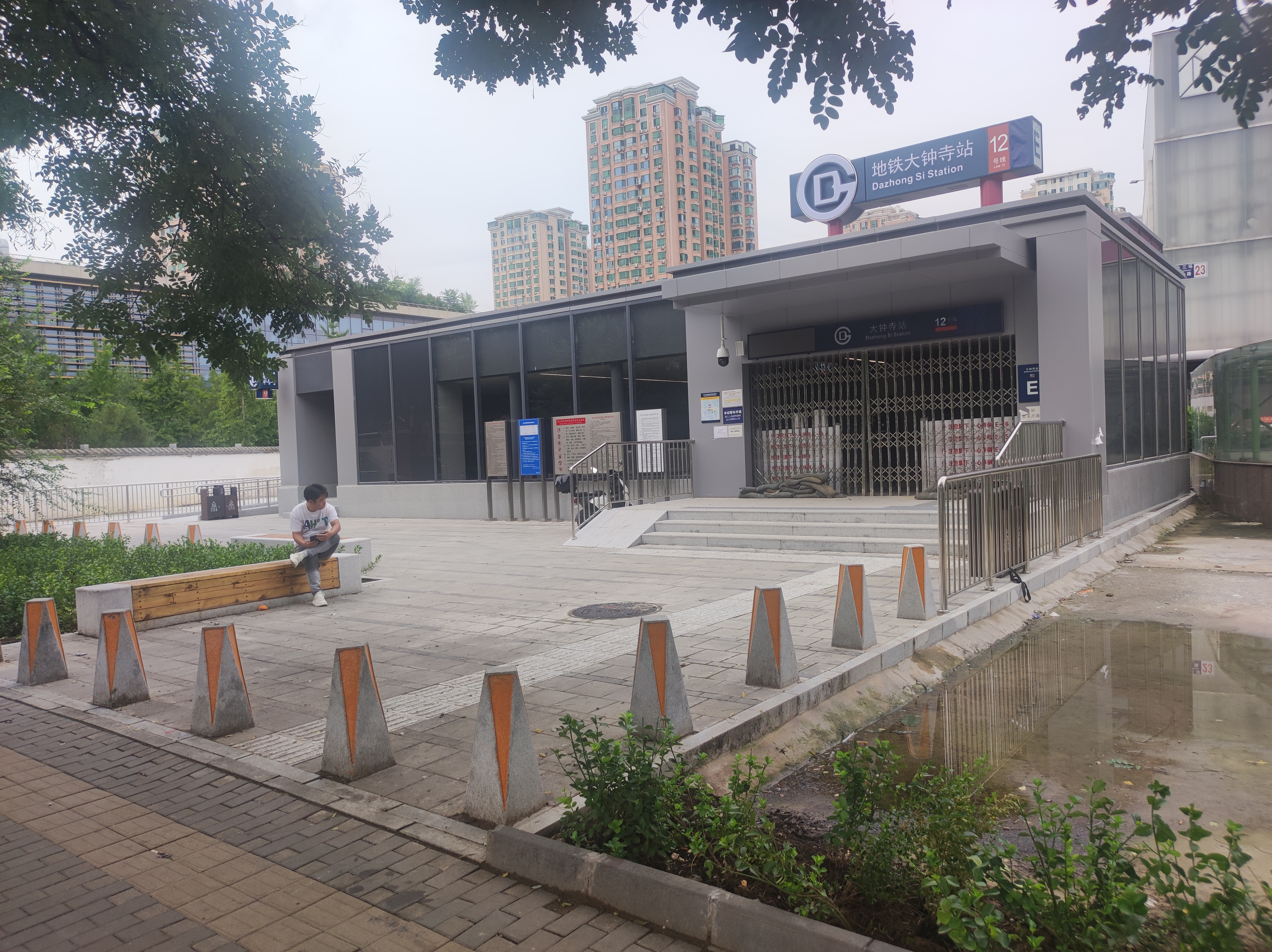
Exit E of Dazhong Si Station
