= Madian Qiao station =

Beijing Subway Line 12 station

Madian Qiao 马甸桥
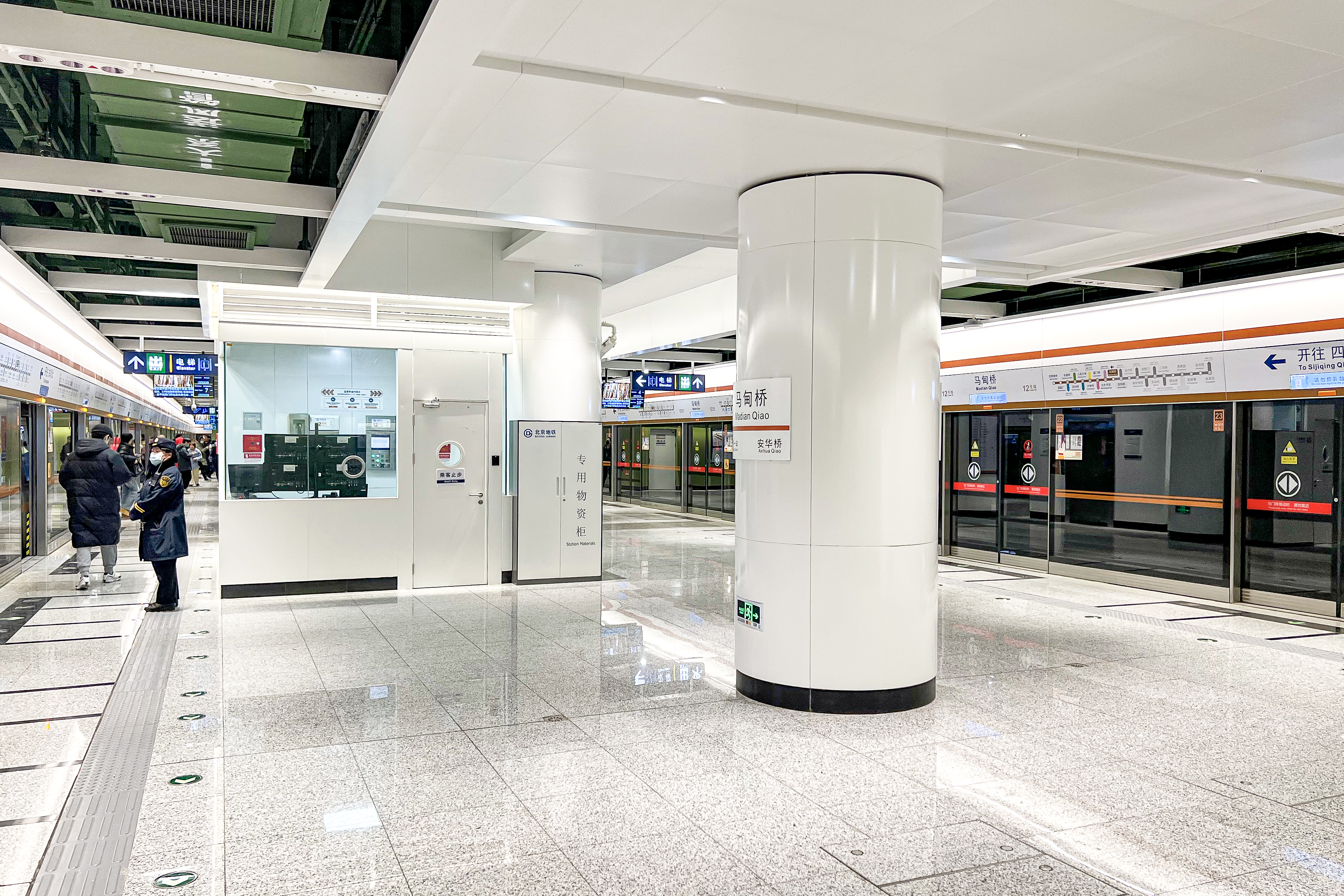
- Platform

Chinese name
- Simplified Chinese: 马甸桥站
- Traditional Chinese: 馬甸橋站
Transcriptions
Standard Mandarin
- Hanyu Pinyin: Mǎdiàn Qiáo zhàn

General information
- Location: East side of Madian Bridge, at the intersection of North 3rd Ring Road Middle, Desheng Outer Gate Street (德胜门外大街) and G6 Beijing–Lhasa Expressway; On the border between Desheng Subdistrict in Madian and Huayuan Road Subdistrict, Xicheng District / Haidian District border, Beijing; China
- Coordinates: 39°58′00″N 116°22′27″E
- Operator: Beijing Mass Transit Railway Operation Corporation Limited
- Line: Line 12
- Platforms: 2 (1 island platform)
- Tracks: 2

Construction
- Structure type: Underground
- Accessible: Yes

History
- Opened: December 15, 2024; 20 months ago

Services
Preceding station	Beijing Subway	Following station
Beitaipingzhuang towards Sijiqing Qiao	Line 12	Anhua Qiao towards Dongbabei
Location
- Location within Beijing

Madian Qiao station (simplified Chinese: 马甸桥站; traditional Chinese: 馬甸橋站; pinyin: Mǎdiàn Qiáo zhàn) is a station on Line 12 of the Beijing Subway. It opened on December 15, 2024.

== Location ==
The station is located under the North 3rd Ring Road Middle at the intersection of Desheng Outer Gate Street and G6 Beijing–Lhasa Expressway under the east side of Madian Bridge. It is on the border between Desheng Subdistrict in Madian in Haidian District and Huayuan Road Subdistrict in Xicheng District.

== Station features ==
The station has an underground island platform.

== Exits ==
There are 3 exits, lettered A, B and D. Exit B has an accessible elevator. Exit C has not been built yet in the initial opening of the station.

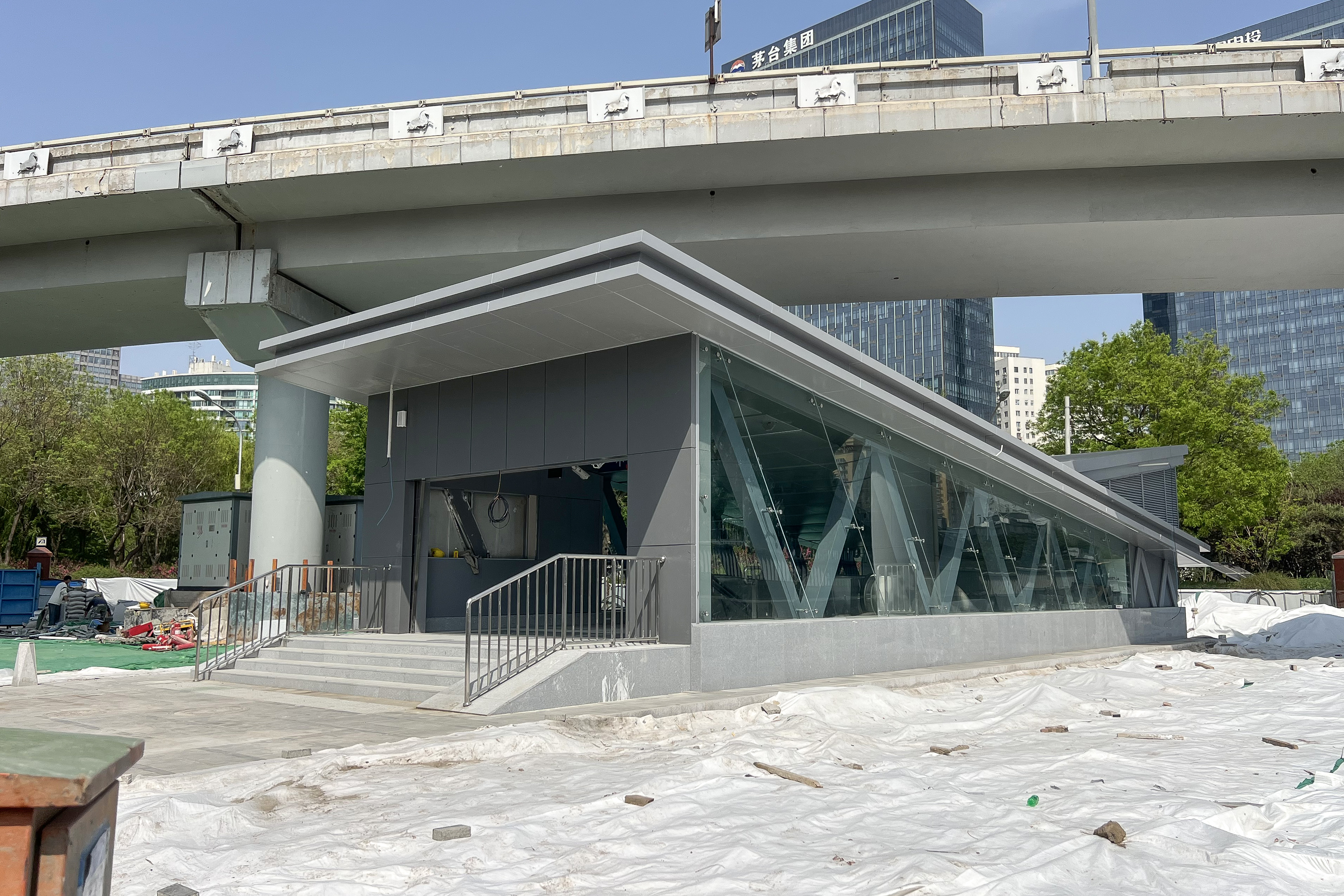
Exit A

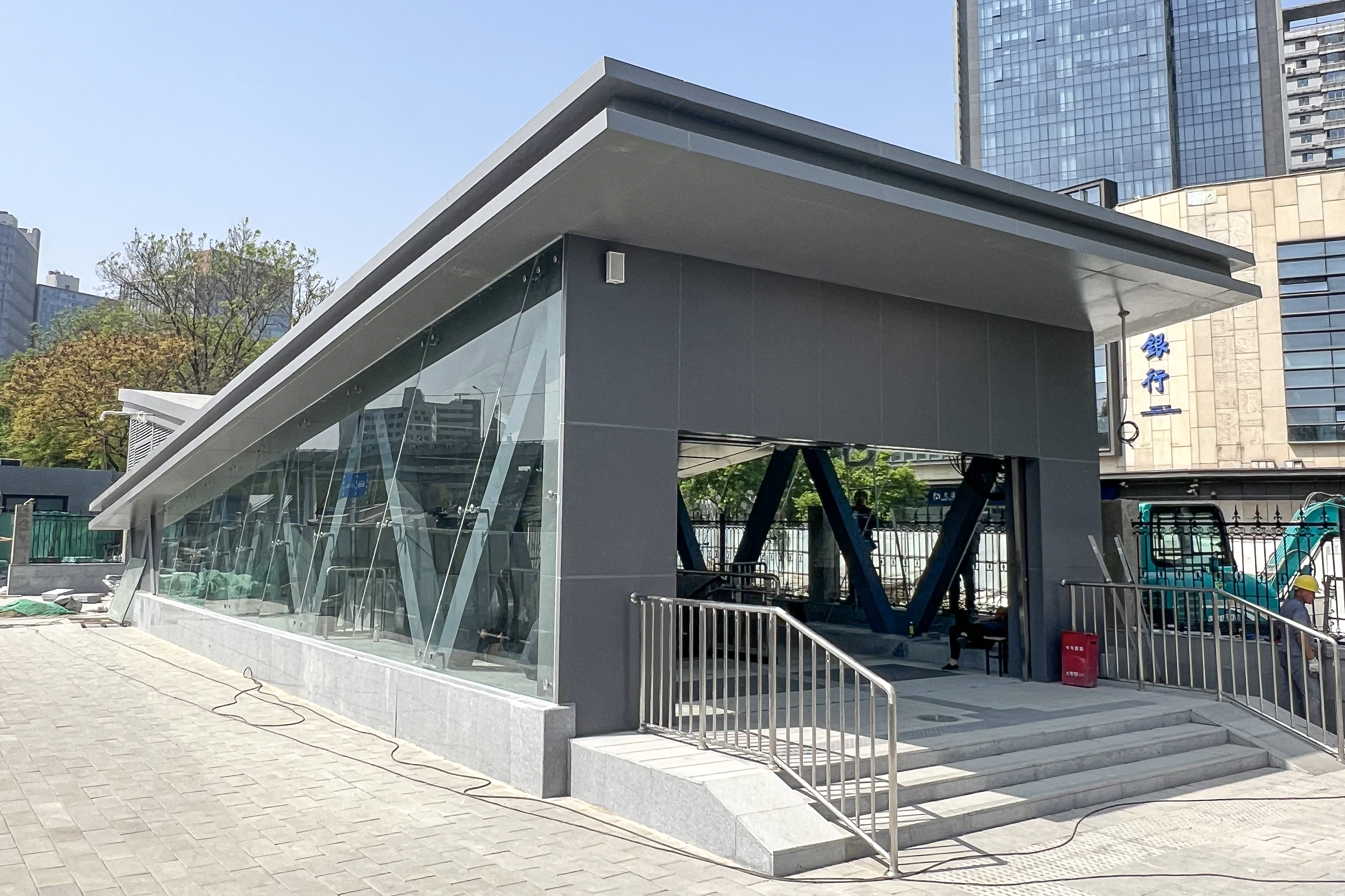
Exit B

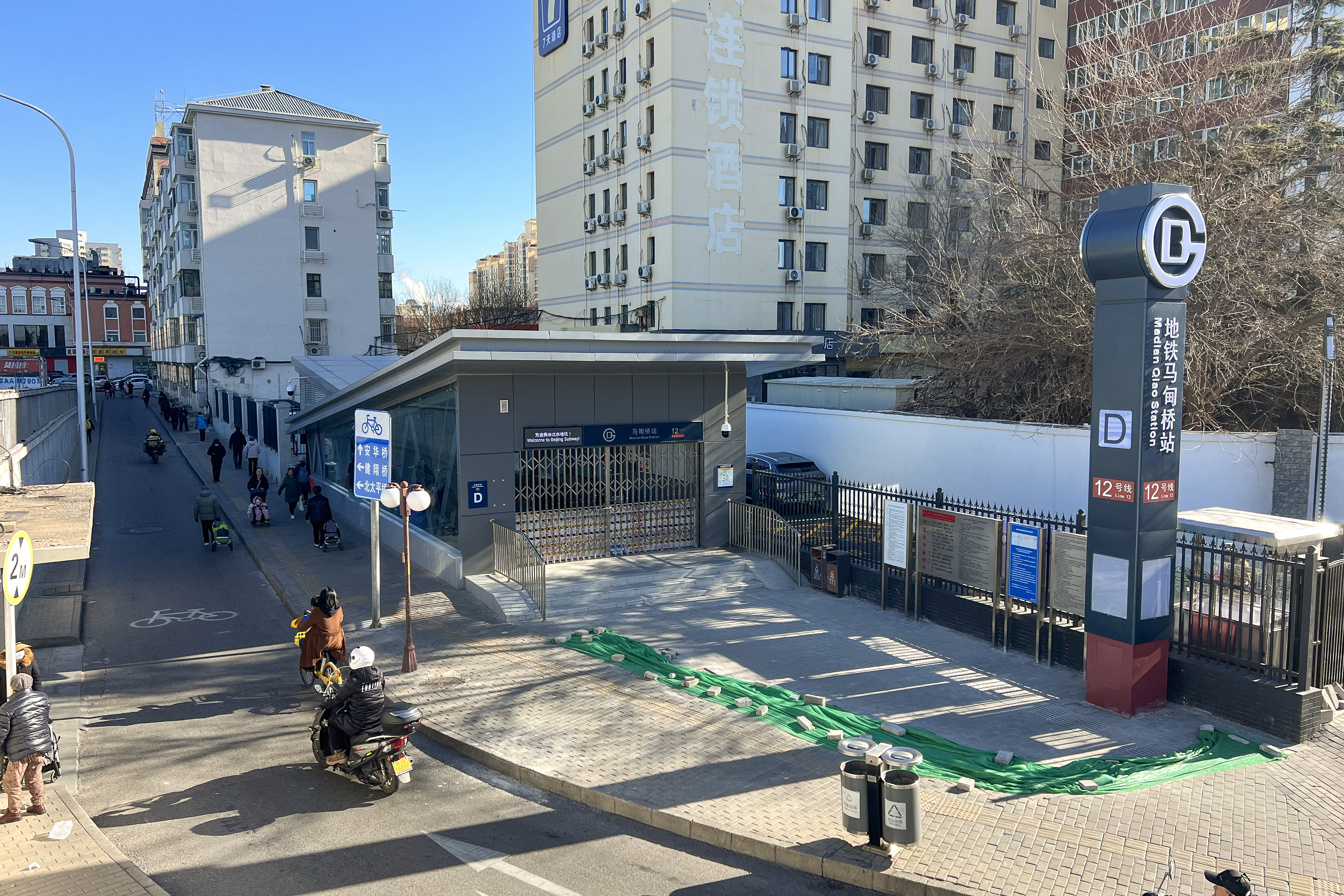
Exit D

== History ==
The station was formerly named as Madian, which was then proposed to be renamed to "Madian Qiao" on July 21, 2023, according to the announcement of the Beijing Municipal Planning and Nature Commission. On January 3, 2024, the station was officially renamed. It was put into use on December 15, 2024, with the opening of Line 12.

== Gallery ==
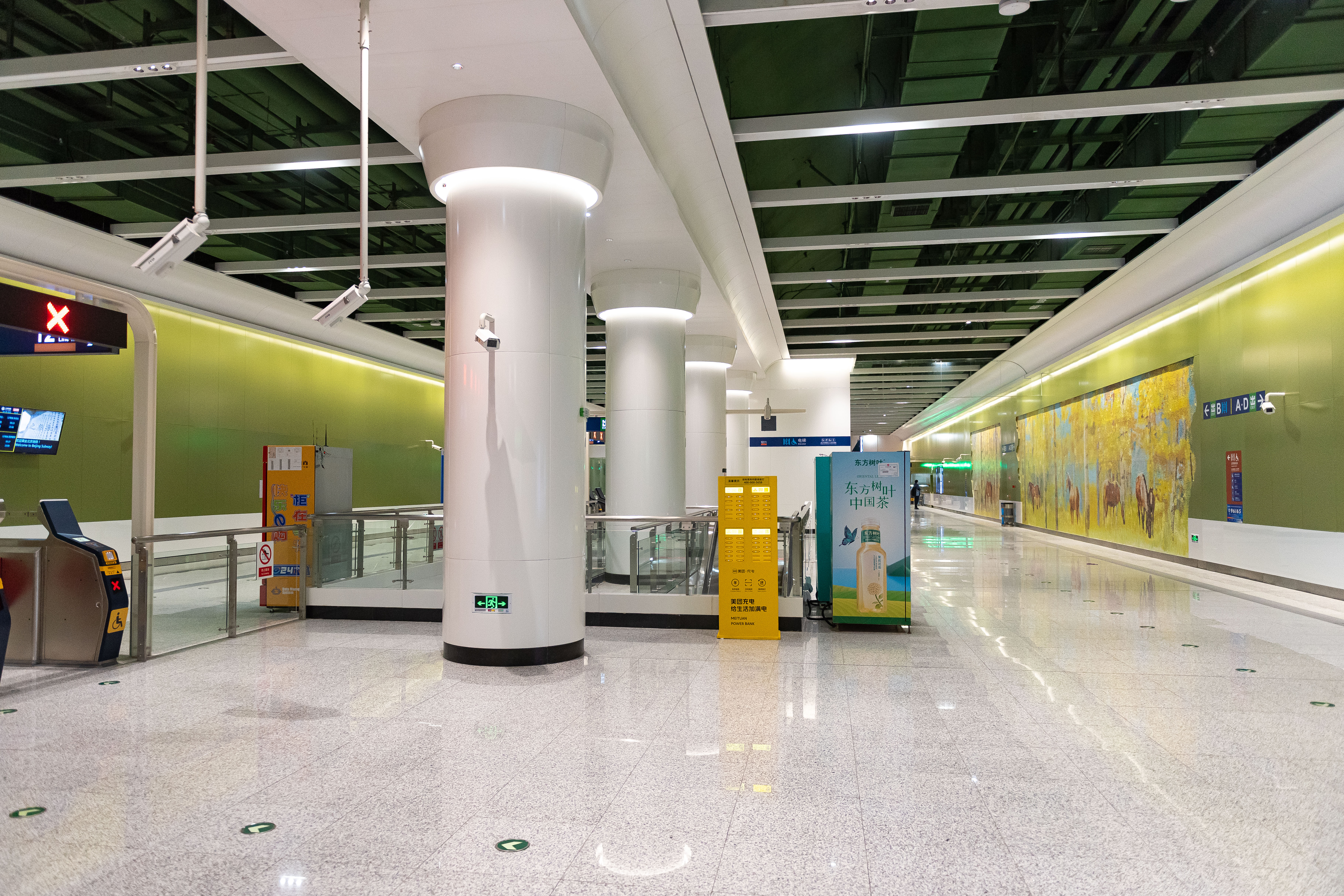
Concourse

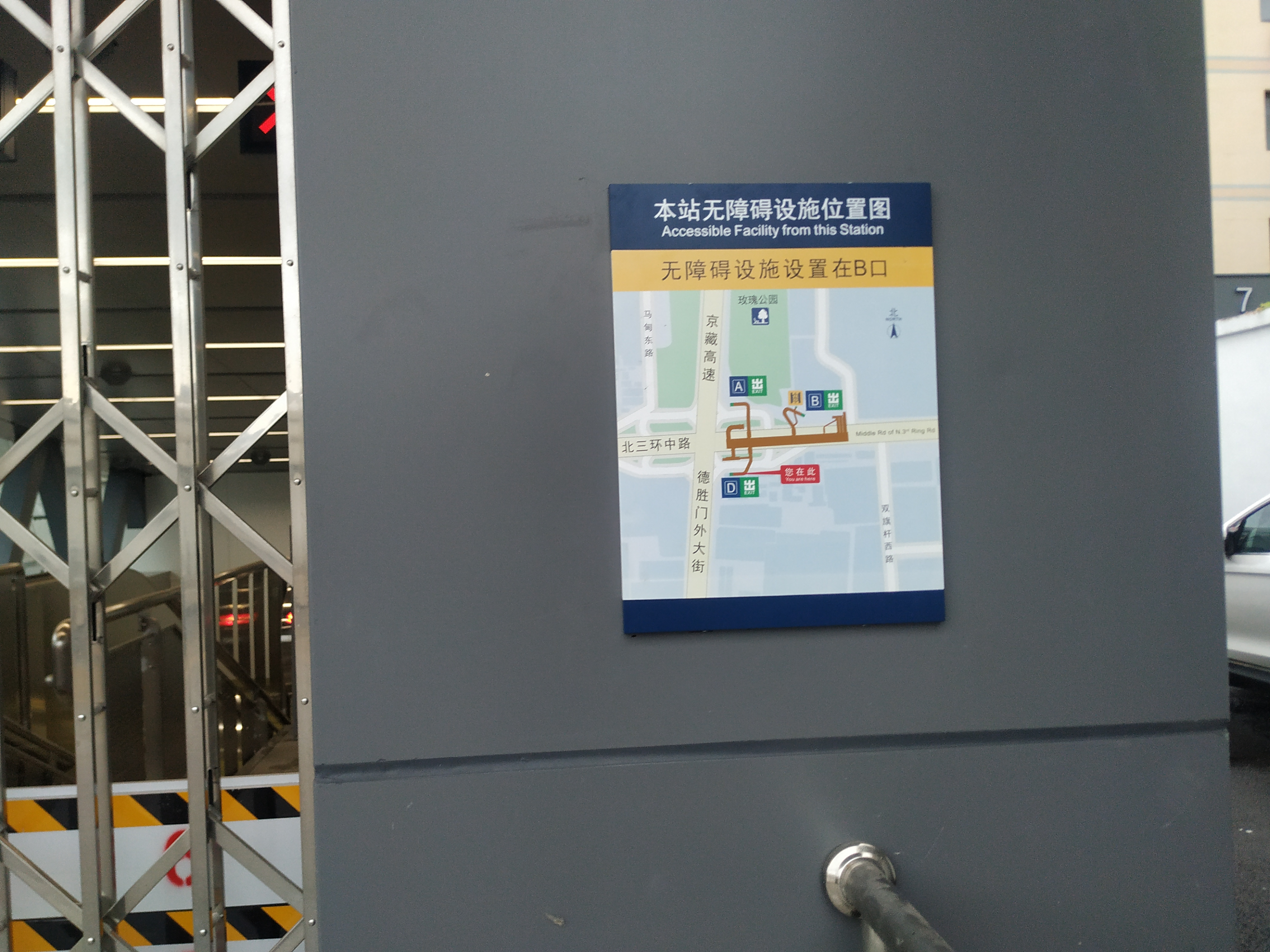
Station schematic, without marking Exit C which has not started construction
