= Dongfeng station =

Dongfeng station may refer to:

- Dongfeng station (Guangzhou Metro), a station on Line 14 (Guangzhou Metro)
- Dongfeng station (Wuxi Metro), a station on Line 3 (Wuxi Metro)
- Dongbabei station, a station on Line 3 and Line 12 of Beijing Subway which was previously named Dongfeng
