= Cui Shuqiang =

Chinese politician

Cui Shuqiang (born in May 1963, Chinese: 崔述强), a native of Beijing, is a politician in the People's Republic of China.

== Biography ==
Cui Shuqiang became a member of the Chinese Communist Party in September 1988, and graduated from Beijing Finance and Trade College with a degree in business administration. In August 2002, he was designated as the director of the Beijing Municipal Bureau of Statistics. In February 2009, he was designated as the deputy secretary-general of the Beijing Municipal Committee of the Chinese Communist Party and the executive deputy director of the General Office of the Beijing Municipal Party Committee. In July 2013, he was designated as the deputy secretary-general of the Beijing Municipal Party Committee and the director of its General Office. In June 2015, he was designated as the secretary of the Haidian district of CCP Beijing Municipal Committee. In June 2017, he was appointed as a member of the Standing Committee of the Beijing Municipal Committee of the CCP, serving as Secretary General and Director of the General Office of the CCP. In 2020, he was appointed to the Standing Committee of the CCP Beijing Municipal Committee and served as Executive Vice Mayor of Beijing. In January 2022, he assumed the position of Vice Chairman of the Beijing Municipal Committee of the Chinese People's Political Consultative Conference (Chinese: 中国人民政治协商会议北京市委员会).

Party political offices
Preceded by Zhang Gong	Secretary-General of the CCP Beijing Municipal Committee; 2017－2020	Succeeded by Zhang Jiaming
Preceded by Sui Zhenjiang	Secretary of the CCP Haidian District Committee; 2015－2017	Succeeded by Yu Jun
Government offices
Preceded by Lin Keqin	Executive Vice Mayor of the Beijing Municipal People's Government; 2020－2023	Succeeded by Xia Linmao
Preceded by Liu Jigang	Director General of the Beijing Municipal Bureau of Statistics; 2002－2009	Succeeded by Su Hui
