= Dongbaxi station =

Beijing Subway Line 12 station

Dongbaxi 东坝西
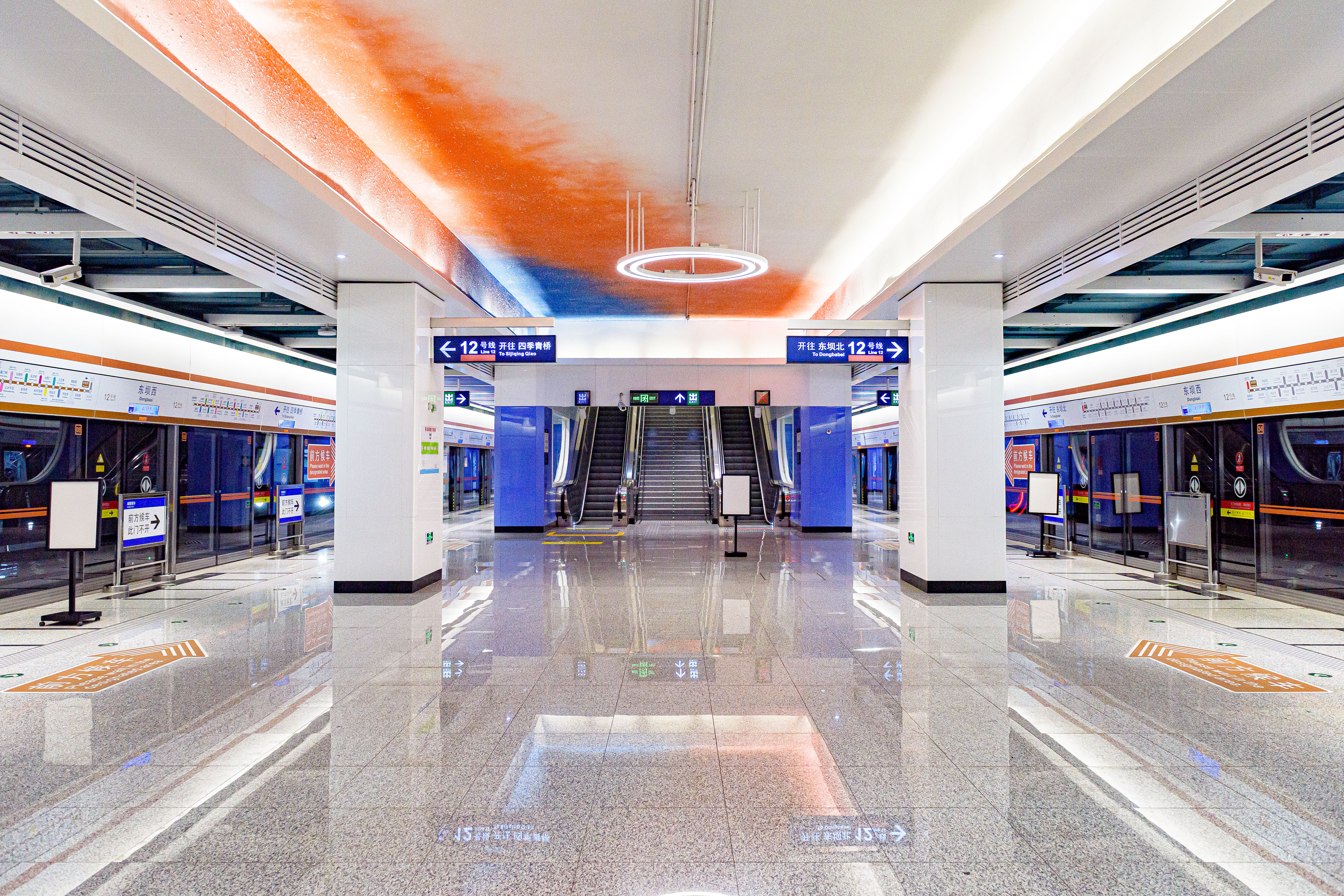
- Platform in June 2026

General information
- Location: Jiangtai East Road; Beigangzi Village; North of the intersection of Ba River (坝河) and Liangma River (亮马河), on the border between Dongba Area and Jiangtai Area; Chaoyang, Beijing; China
- Coordinates: 39.973186°N 116.528728°E
- Operator: Beijing Mass Transit Railway Operation Corporation Limited
- Line: Line 12
- Platforms: 2 (1 island platform)
- Tracks: 2

Construction
- Structure type: Underground
- Accessible: Yes

History
- Opening: December 15, 2024; 20 months ago
- Former names: Beigangzi (北岗子), Xiyangba (西阳坝)

Services
Preceding station	Beijing Subway	Following station
Tuofangying towards Sijiqing Qiao	Line 12	Dongbabei Terminus
Location
- Location within Beijing

Dongbaxi station (Chinese: 东坝西站; pinyin: Dōngbà Xī zhàn) is a station on Line 12 of Beijing Subway. It opened on December 15, 2024.

== Location ==
The station is located in Beigangzi Village, on the Jiangtai East Road, to the north of the intersection of Ba River (坝河) and Liangma River (亮马河), on the border between Dongba Area and Jiangtai Area.

== Exits ==
There are 2 exits, lettered A and C. Both exits are located on Jiangtai East Road. Exit C has an accessible elevator.

== History ==
The station was previously named as Beigangzi (Chinese: 北岗子; pinyin: Běigāngzi). In July 2023, the station was proposed to be renamed as Xiyangba (Chinese: 西阳坝; pinyin: Xīyángbà), named after the ancient Xiyang Dam (simplified Chinese: 西阳坝; traditional Chinese: 西陽壩). The station was officially named as Dongbaxi on 3 January 2024.

== Gallery ==
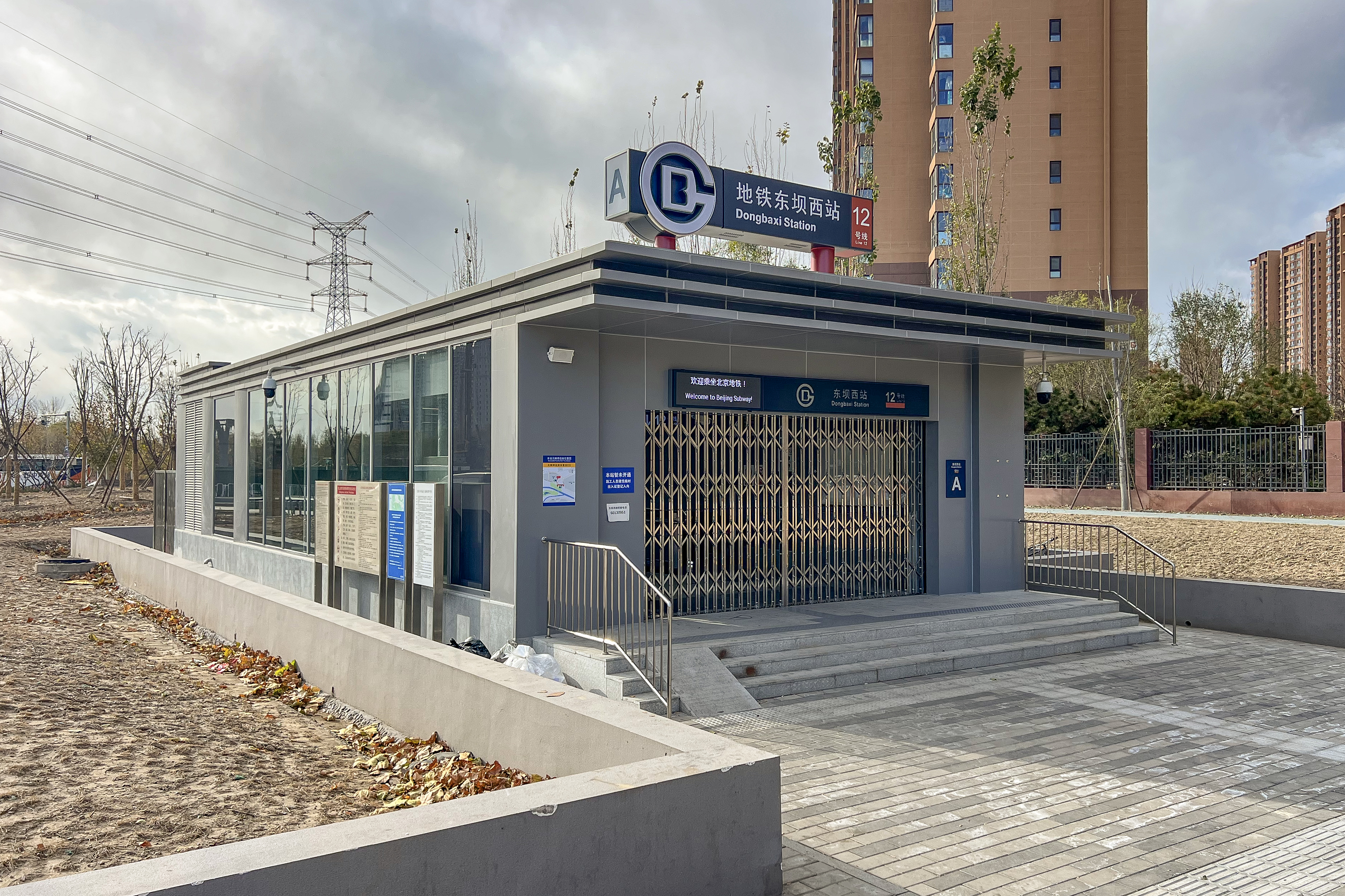
Exit A

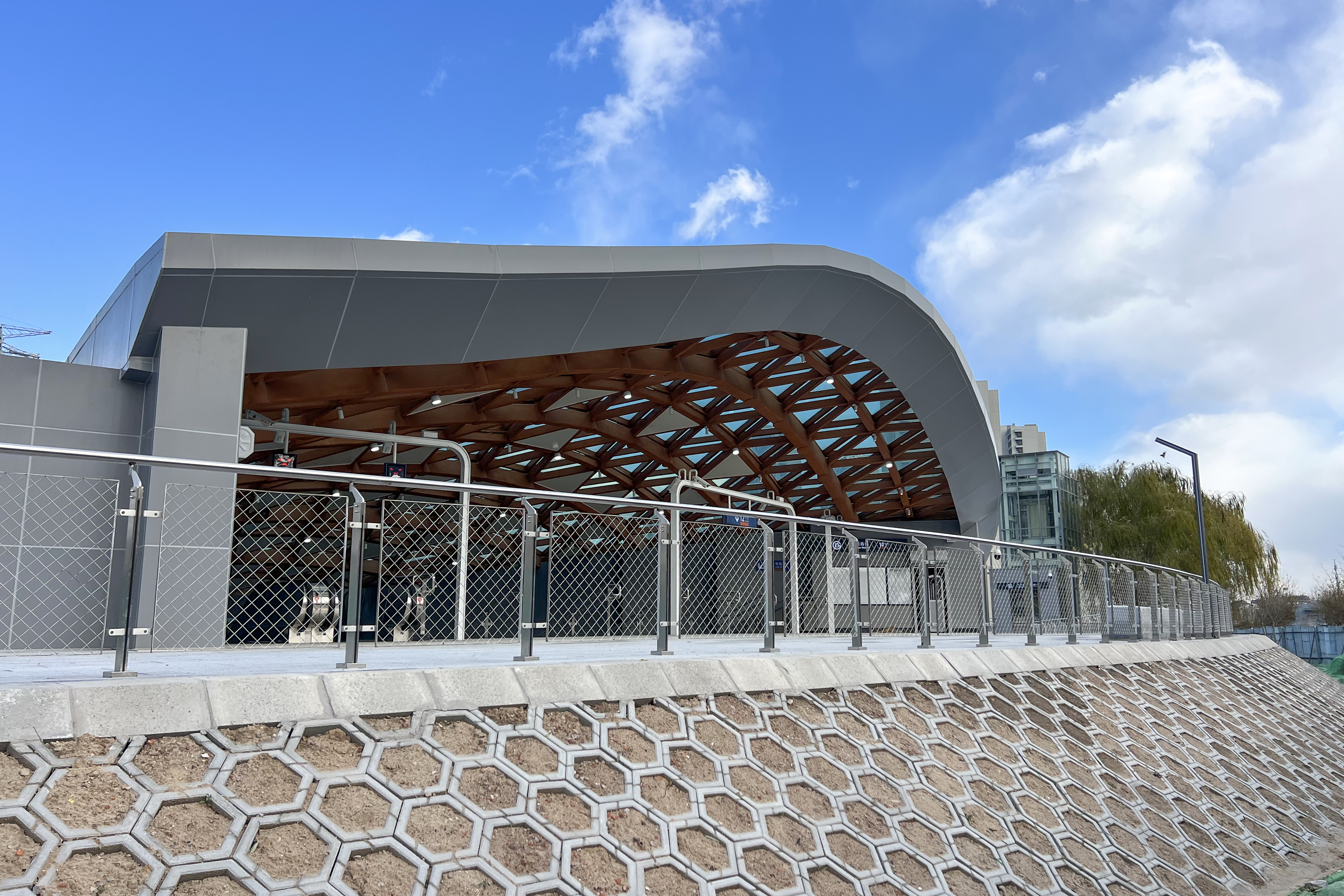
Exit C

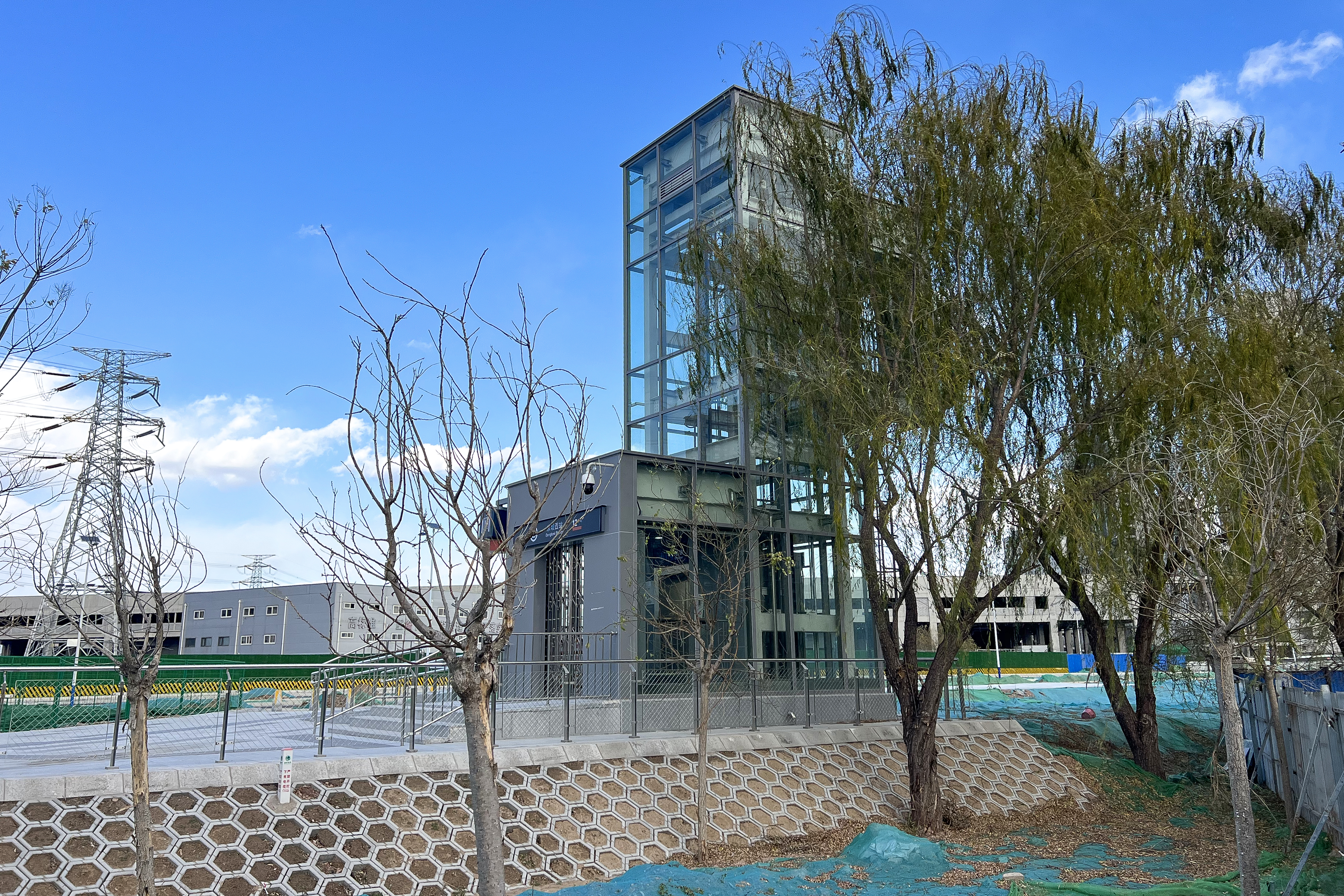
Exit C accessible exit
