= Guizhou Normal University =

University in Guiyang, China

- 贵州师范大学
- Former names: National Guiyang Normal College
- Motto: 慎思笃行，博学致新
- Motto in English: Contemplation, Honesty, Erudition, Creativity
- Type: Public
- Established: 1941
- Affiliations: 111 Plan
- Party Secretary: Han Hui (韩卉)
- Undergraduates: 10,334
- Postgraduates: 3,000
- Location: Guiyang, Guizhou Province, China
- Website: www.gznu.edu.cn
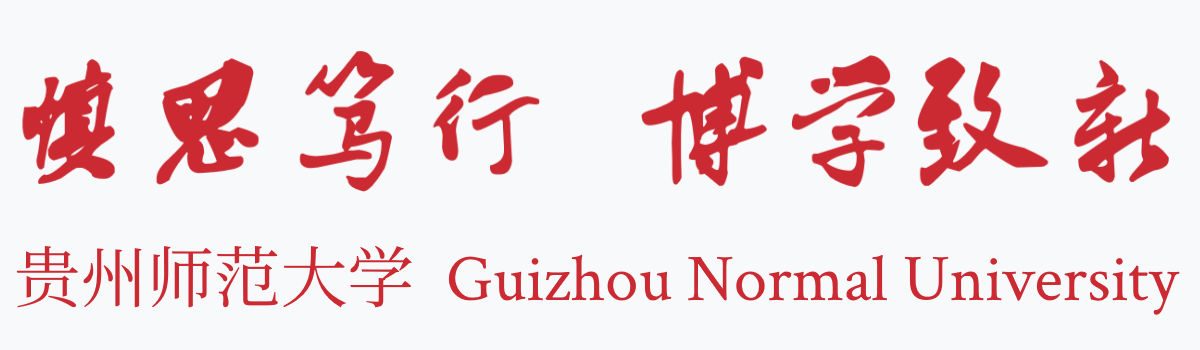

Guizhou Normal University (GZNU; Chinese: 贵州师范大学; pinyin: Guìzhōu Shīfàn Dàxué) is a provincial research university in the historic "summer capital of China" in Guiyang, Guizhou province. It was established in 1941 as one of the original eight normal schools (teacher-training institutions) in China.

With a total enrollment of over 36,000 full-time students, Guizhou Normal University grants undergraduate, graduate, and doctoral degrees through 24 colleges and departments. The university also educates working professionals and adults through a college of continuing education.

== History ==
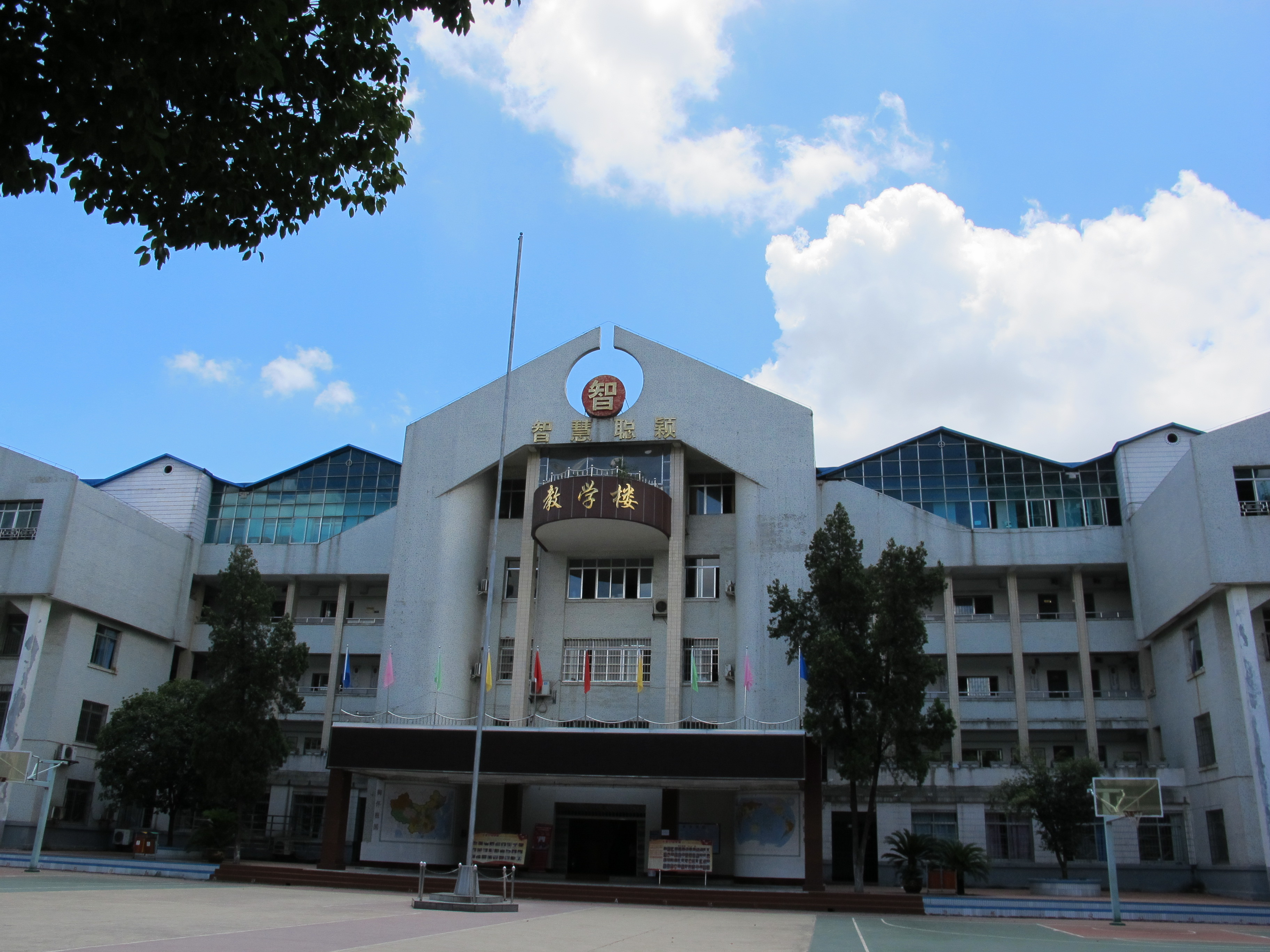
The university maintains extensive connections with local educational institutions, including the High School Affiliated to Guizhou Normal University

The university was founded in 1941 as National Guiyang Normal College (Chinese: 国立贵阳师范学院). After the formation of the People's Republic of China in 1949 it was renamed Guiyang Normal College, then in 1985 it became Guizhou Normal University and in 1996 it was accredited as a provincial key university in Guizhou.

In 2004, the former Guizhou Vocational Institute of Technology merged into the university.

== See also ==
- List of universities in China
