= Line 12 (Beijing Subway) =

Metro line in Beijing, China

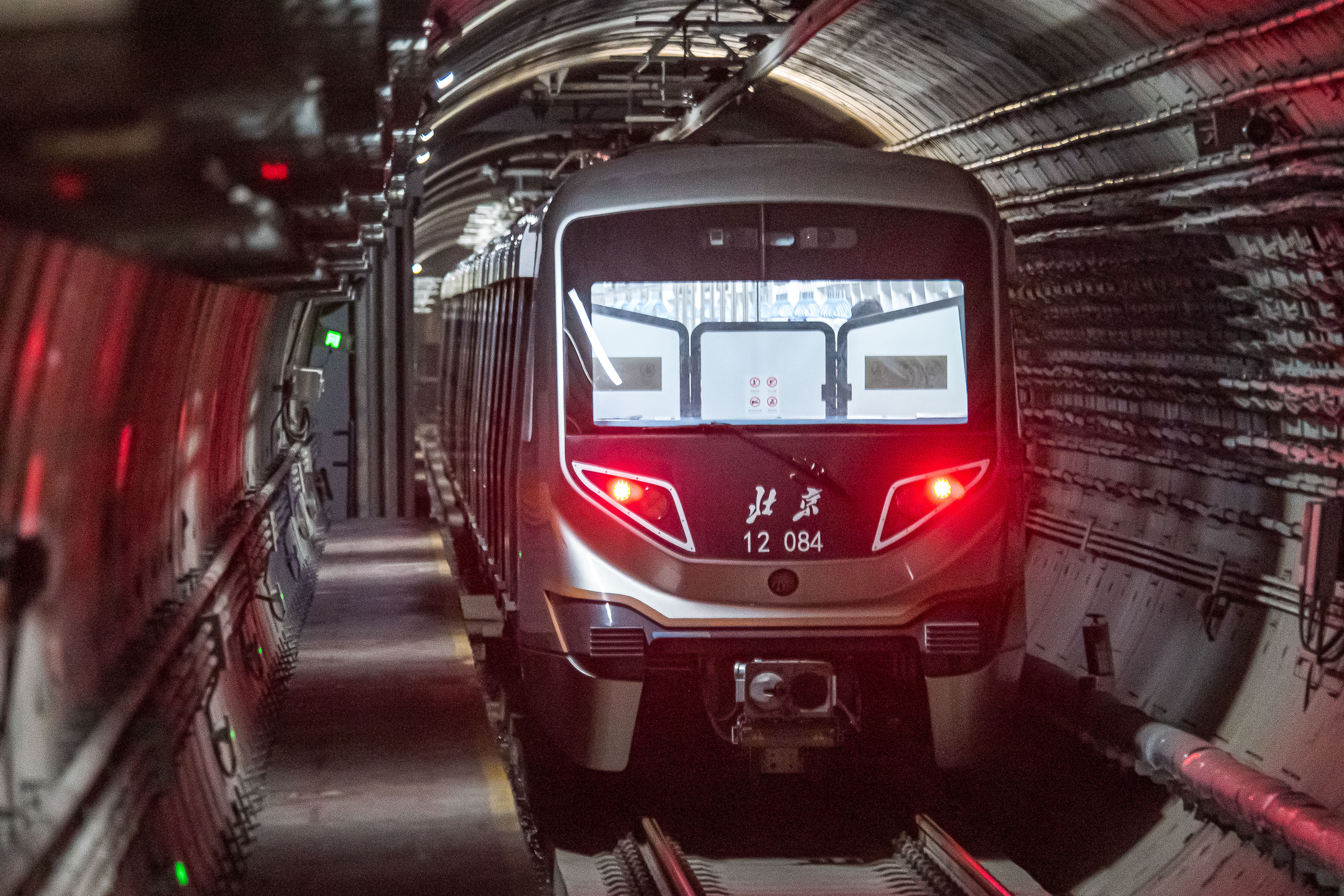
- A train of Line 12 leaving Guangxi Men station

Overview
- Other name: M12 (planned name)
- Status: Operational
- Termini: Sijiqing Qiao; Dongbabei
- Stations: 20 (excluding planned East & South extensions)

Service
- Type: Rapid transit
- System: Beijing Subway
- Services: 1
- Depot: Dongba
- Rolling stock: 4-car or 8-car Type A
- Daily ridership: 171,500 (2025 Avg.)

History
- Opened: December 15, 2024; 21 months ago

Technical
- Line length: 27.5 km (17.1 mi)
- Character: Underground
- Track gauge: 1,435 mm (4 ft 8 1/2 in)
- Operating speed: 80 km/h (50 mph)

Line 12 of the Beijing Subway (Chinese: 北京地铁12号线; pinyin: běijīng dìtiě shí'èr hàoxiàn) is rapid transit line in Beijing. The line is 27.5 km (17.1 mi) with 20 stations. It is fully underground and is colored brown on maps. The line between Sijiqing Qiao and Dongbabei opened on December 15, 2024.

== Stations ==
Station Name		Connections	Nearby Bus Stops	Distance km		Location
English	Chinese	Connections	Nearby Bus Stops	Distance km		Location
Haidian Wuluju (under planning)	海淀五路居	6				Haidian
Sijiqing Qiao	四季青桥		61 121 334 400 400快 450 505 611 644 658 683 688 698 952 981 982 专98	0.000	0.000	Haidian
Landianchang	蓝靛厂		33 360 365 424 425 539 644 688 921 专75	2.193	2.193	Haidian
Changchun Qiao	长春桥	10	33 74 355 360 365 424 425 437 539 644 688 921	0.829	3.022	Haidian
Suzhou Qiao	苏州桥	16	26 56 74 323 355 361 365 368 425 450 563 610 614 634 651 688 921 夜30	1.259	4.281	Haidian
Renmin Univ.	人民大学	4	26 300 300快 302 305 320 323 332 355 361 365 368 425 549 584 614 651 653 658 695 921 快速直达专线19 快速直达专线139 夜8 夜30	1.579	5.860	Haidian
Dazhong Si	大钟寺	13 (OSI)	87 88 94 300 302 315 361 368 425 606 658 695 921 夜30 专168 专216	1.722	7.582	Haidian
Jimen Qiao	蓟门桥	Changping	16 21 87 88 94 300 302 315 361 368 375 387 425 603 606 632 658 671 686 693 695 921 夜30 专168	1.072	8.654	Haidian
Beitaipingzhuang	北太平庄	19	16 22 47 88 123 135 300 300快 302 315 331 345快 361 368 387 425 508 510 579 604 606 618 620 645 671 695 883 885 886 886区 921 快速直达专线66 快速直达专线148 夜4 夜30 夜38	1.204	9.858	Haidian / Xicheng
Madian Qiao	马甸桥		5 55 123 143 300 300快 302 328 344 345 345快 361 368 387 601 604 625 670 671 695 872 883 885 886 886区 919快 921 快速直达专线12 快速直达专线66 快速直达专线124 快速直达专线125 快速直达专线128 快速直达专线134 快速直达专线148 快速直达专线214 夜2 夜30	1.022	10.880	Xicheng
Anhua Qiao	安华桥	8	5 21 82 92 113 142 300 300快 302 328 361 368 380 387 409 515 601 604 607 671 921 944 快速直达专线178 夜30	1.230	12.110	Xicheng / Chaoyang
Anzhen Qiao	安贞桥		18 108 117 124 141 300 300快 301 302 328 361 368 601 604 607 671 921 944 BRT3(快速公交3) 夜30 夜34 专8	0.966	13.076	Chaoyang / Dongcheng
Heping Xiqiao	和平西桥	5	75 95 117 125 300 302 328 361 368 430 547 601 604 607 641 671 921 快速直达专线178 夜26 夜30	0.860	13.936	Chaoyang
Guangxi Men	光熙门	13	95 130 300 302 368 379 547 596 604 641 671 916快 942 980快 快速直达专线41 夜30	1.031	14.967	Chaoyang
Xibahe	西坝河	17	95 130 132 300 300快 302 368 379 467 515 596 604 641 671 916快 942 980快 快速直达专线195 快速直达专线196 夜30	1.202	16.169	Chaoyang
Sanyuan Qiao	三元桥	10 Capital Airport	18 95 104 132 300 300快 302 359 368 379 401 403 404 419 536 604 641 671 850 850快 852 915 916 916快 918 935 935快 939 980快 快速直达专线72 快速直达专线195 快速直达专线196 夜30	1.775	17.944	Chaoyang
Jiangtaixi	将台西		405 416 451 516 604 657 682	2.311	20.255	Chaoyang
Gaojiayuan	高家园		401 405 418 445 451 988 991	1.397	21.652	Chaoyang
Tuofangying	驼房营		516 专85 专123 专124	1.172	22.824	Chaoyang
Dongbaxi	东坝西		402 571 659 973	2.672	25.496	Chaoyang
Dongbabei	东坝北	3	专30 592	2.045	27.541	Chaoyang
Dongba Beijie (under construction)	东坝北街			1.307	28.848	Chaoyang

== Rolling stock ==
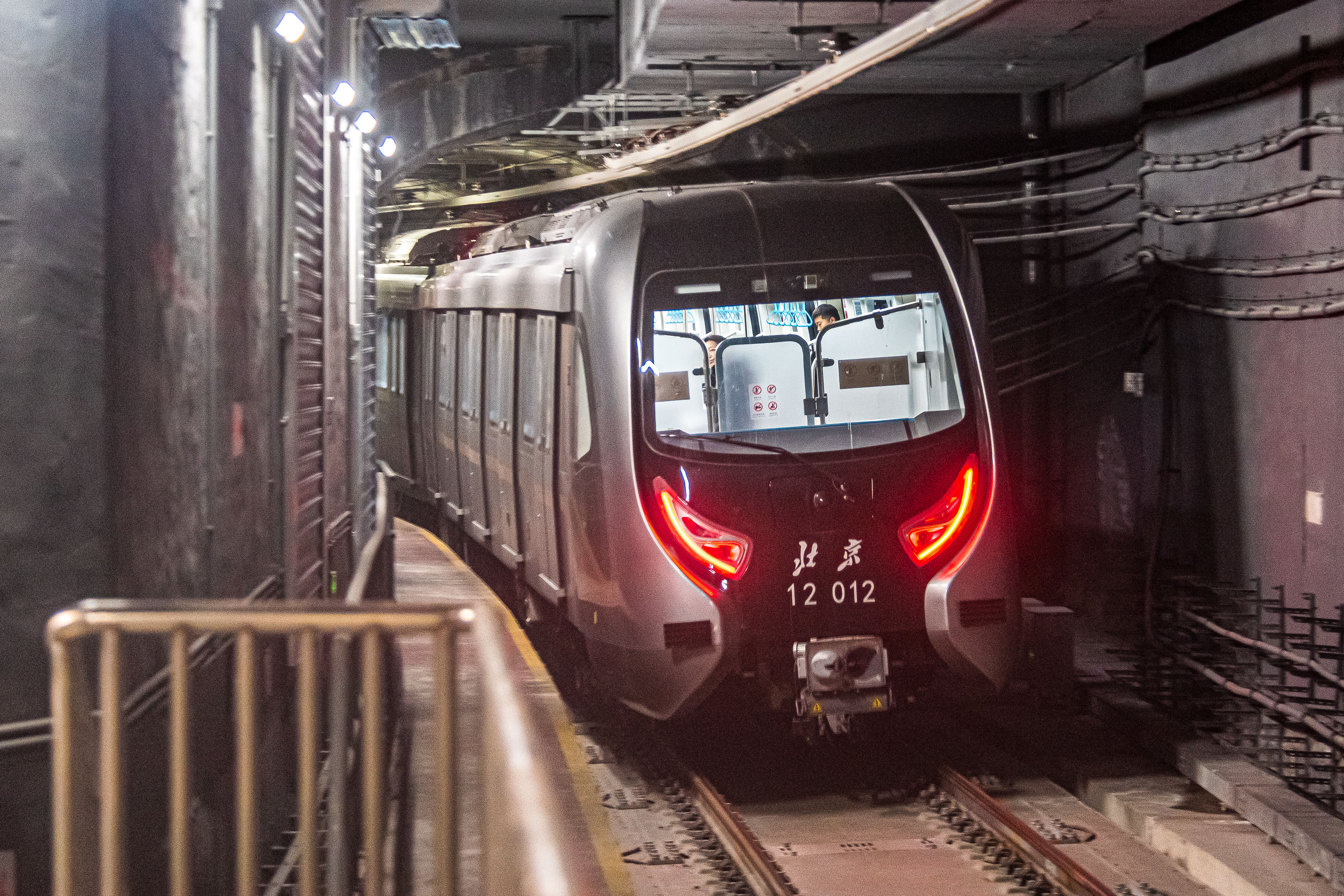
A CRRC Changchun CCD5049 leaving Gaojiayuan station

The line uses 4-car or 8-car Type A rolling stock.

== History ==
Line 12's route has undergone substantial changes on the planners' drawing board. In the late 1990s, one draft of the subway plan showed Line 12 running from the Beijing South railway station to Huangcun. The Beijing South railway station was then built with subway platforms for only Lines 4 and 14. The old plan of Line 12 is cancelled now.

A new plan of Line 12 was announced at January 2012. In June 2012, there were several media reports listing the planned stations of the line. The final planning of the line started from Sijiqing in Haidian District east to Guanzhuangluxikou in Chaoyang District, following the northern Third Ring Road. The entire line has 21 stations, of which 15 will have transfers with other lines. The line will provide relief for the northern arc of the congested Line 10 loop line.
