= Sui Zhenjiang =

Chinese politician

Sui Zhenjiang (born in August 1963, Chinese: 隋振江), a native of Dawa, Liaoning, and is a politician in the People's Republic of China.

== Biography ==
Sui Zhenjiang became a member of the Chinese Communist Party (CCP) in April 1984 and graduated from Peking University with a major in law in August 1985. In August 1992, he was appointed as the deputy director of the Construction Committee for Xicheng District, Beijing. In May 1994, he was designated as the CCP Committee Secretary and director of the Planning Bureau of Xicheng District, Beijing, in addition to serving as the deputy director of the Construction Committee of Xicheng District. In January 1999, he was designated as the deputy mayor of the People's Government of Xicheng District, Beijing. In November 2003, he was designated as the deputy secretary-general of the Beijing Municipal People's Government. In July 2005, he was appointed Secretary of the Party Group and director of the Beijing Municipal Construction Commission. In May 2011, he was appointed as deputy secretary of the Beijing Municipal Haidian District Committee, CCP Committee Secretary of the District Government, deputy mayor, acting mayor, and mayor of the District. In April 2012, he was appointed CCP Committee Secretary of Haidian District and vice mayor of the Beijing Municipal People's Government. In January 2019, he became secretary of the Party Working Committee and director of the newly established Beijing Municipal Administrative Center (Chinese: 北京城市副中心) Committee. In July 2024, he assumed the presidency of the Beijing Municipal Association of Aging Industry.
