= Sijiqing Qiao station =

Beijing Subway Line 12 station

Sijiqing Qiao 四季青桥
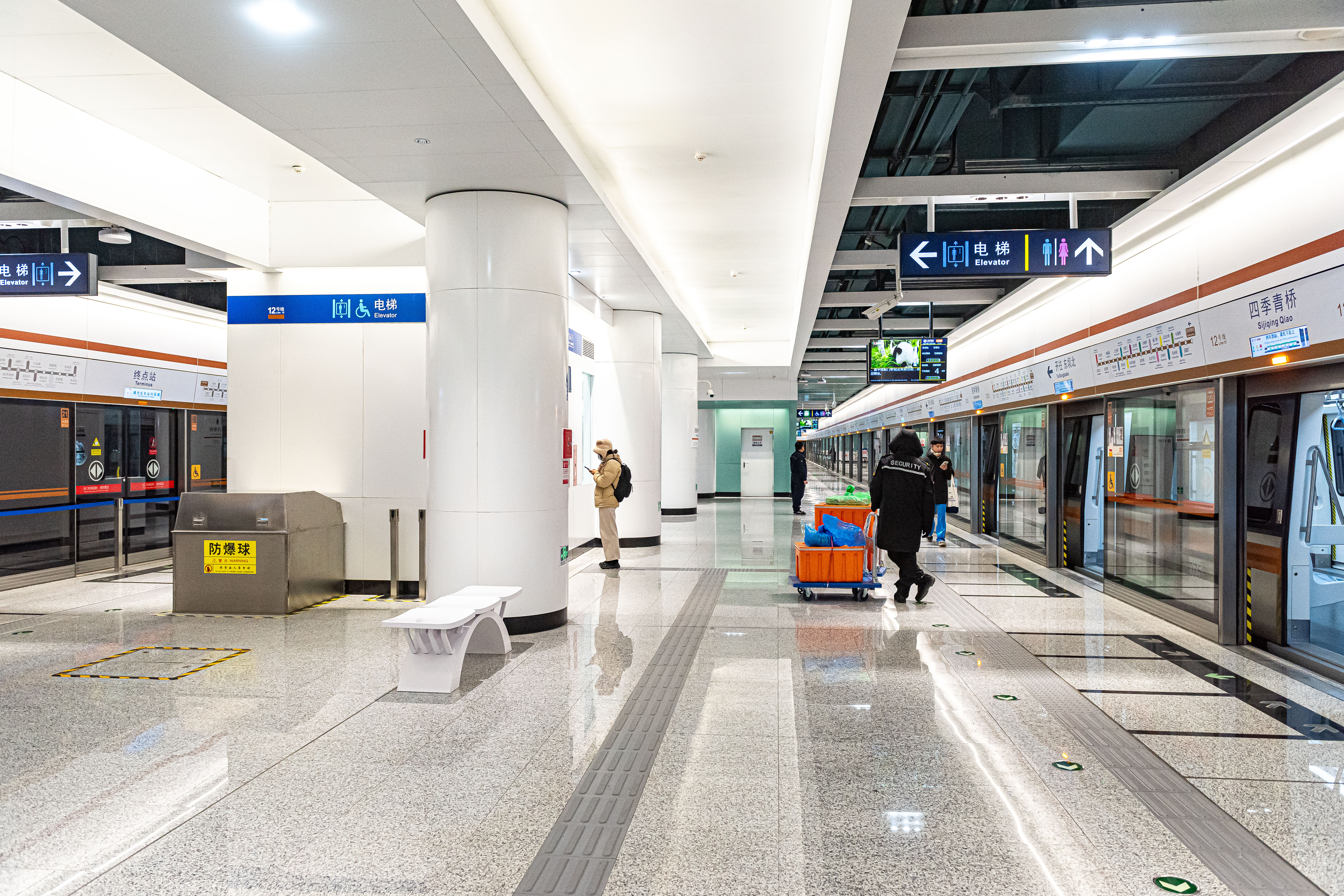
- Platform in December 2024

General information
- Location: Intersection between West 4th Ring Road North, Tonghui Road (通汇路) and Zhanghua Road (彰化路); On the border between Shuguang Subdistrict and Sijiqing Area, Haidian District, Beijing; China
- Coordinates: 39.943732°N 116.267568°E
- Operator: Beijing Mass Transit Railway Operation Corporation Limited
- Line: Line 12
- Platforms: 2 (1 island platform)
- Tracks: 2

Construction
- Structure type: Underground
- Accessible: Yes

History
- Opened: December 15, 2024; 20 months ago

Services
| Preceding station | Beijing Subway | Following station |
|---|---|---|
| Terminus | Line 12 | Landianchang towards Dongbabei |
Location
- Location within Beijing

Sijiqing Qiao station (Chinese: 四季青桥站; pinyin: Sìjìqīng Qiáo zhàn) is the western terminus of the Line 12 of the Beijing Subway, which opened on December 15, 2024.

== Location ==
It is located under the intersection between West 4th Ring Road North and Tonghui Road and Zhanghua Road. It is in the south of Sijiqing Bridge, where the name of the station comes from.

It is on the border between Shuguang Subdistrict and Sijiqing Area, in Haidian, Beijing.

== Exits ==
There are three exits, lettered A, C and D. Only Exits A and C will be opened with the station on the west side of West 4th Ring Road North, and Exit D on the east side of West 4th Ring Road North will have a delayed opening. Exit A has an accessible elevator.

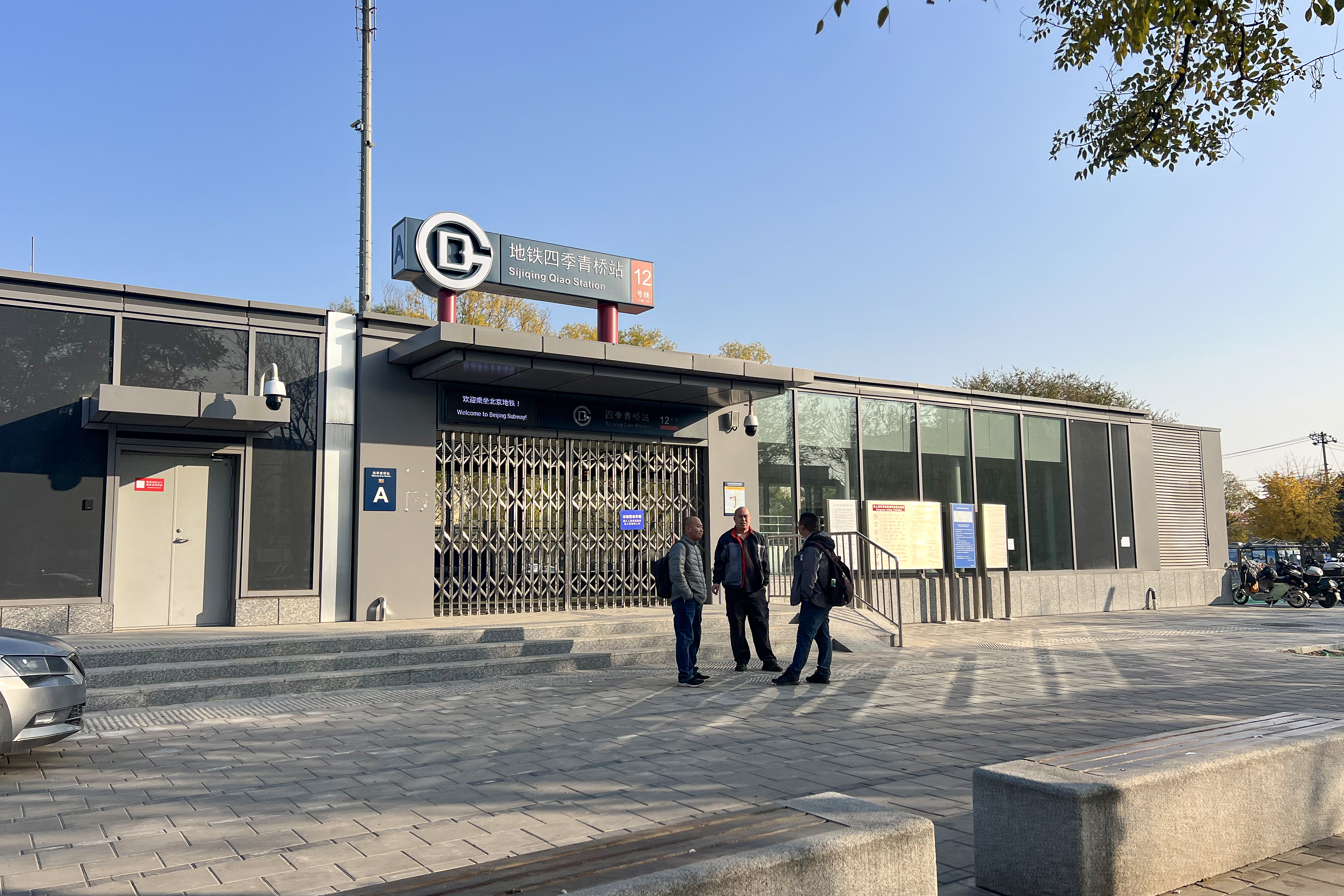
Exit A

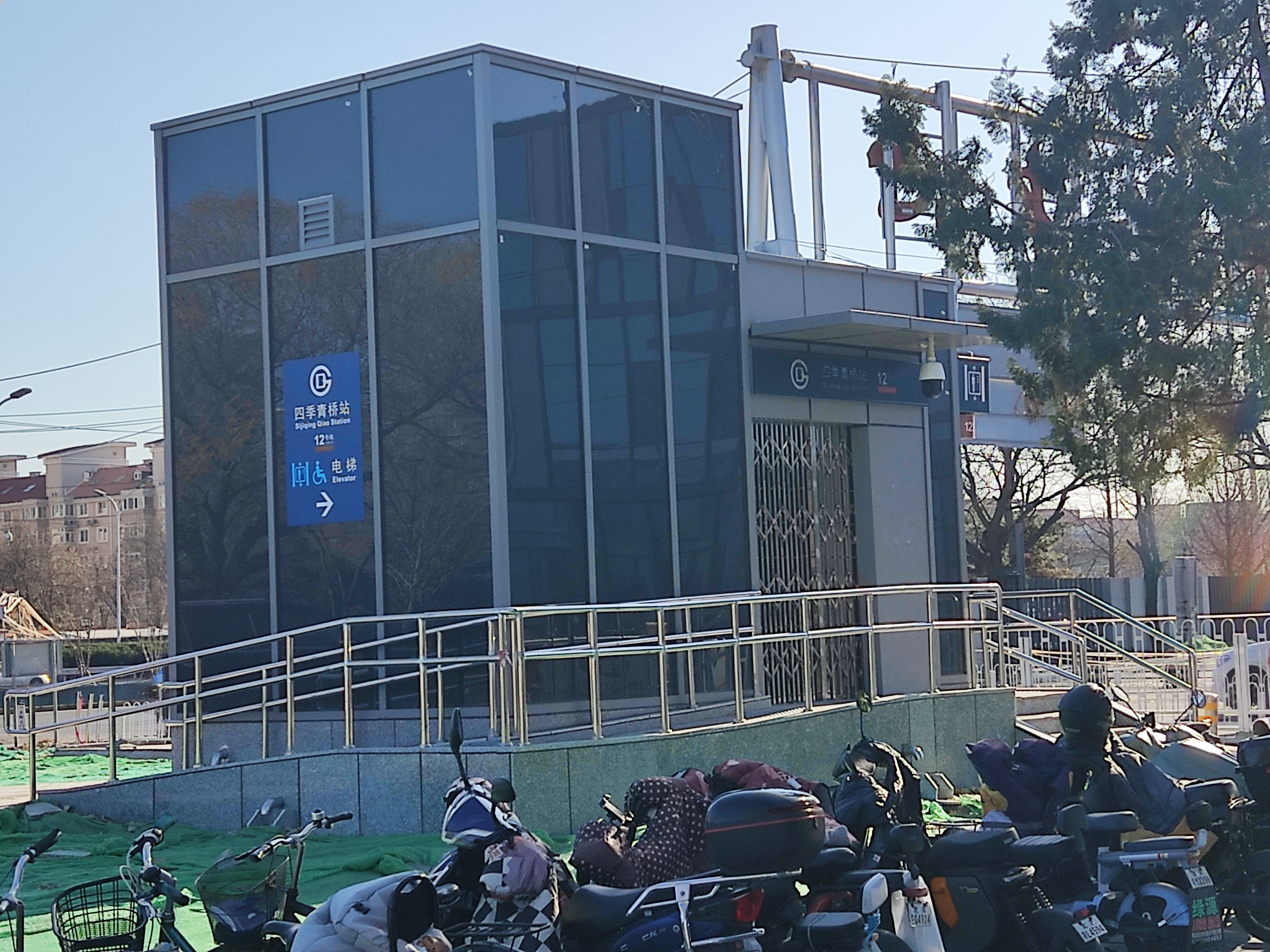
Exit A accessible exit

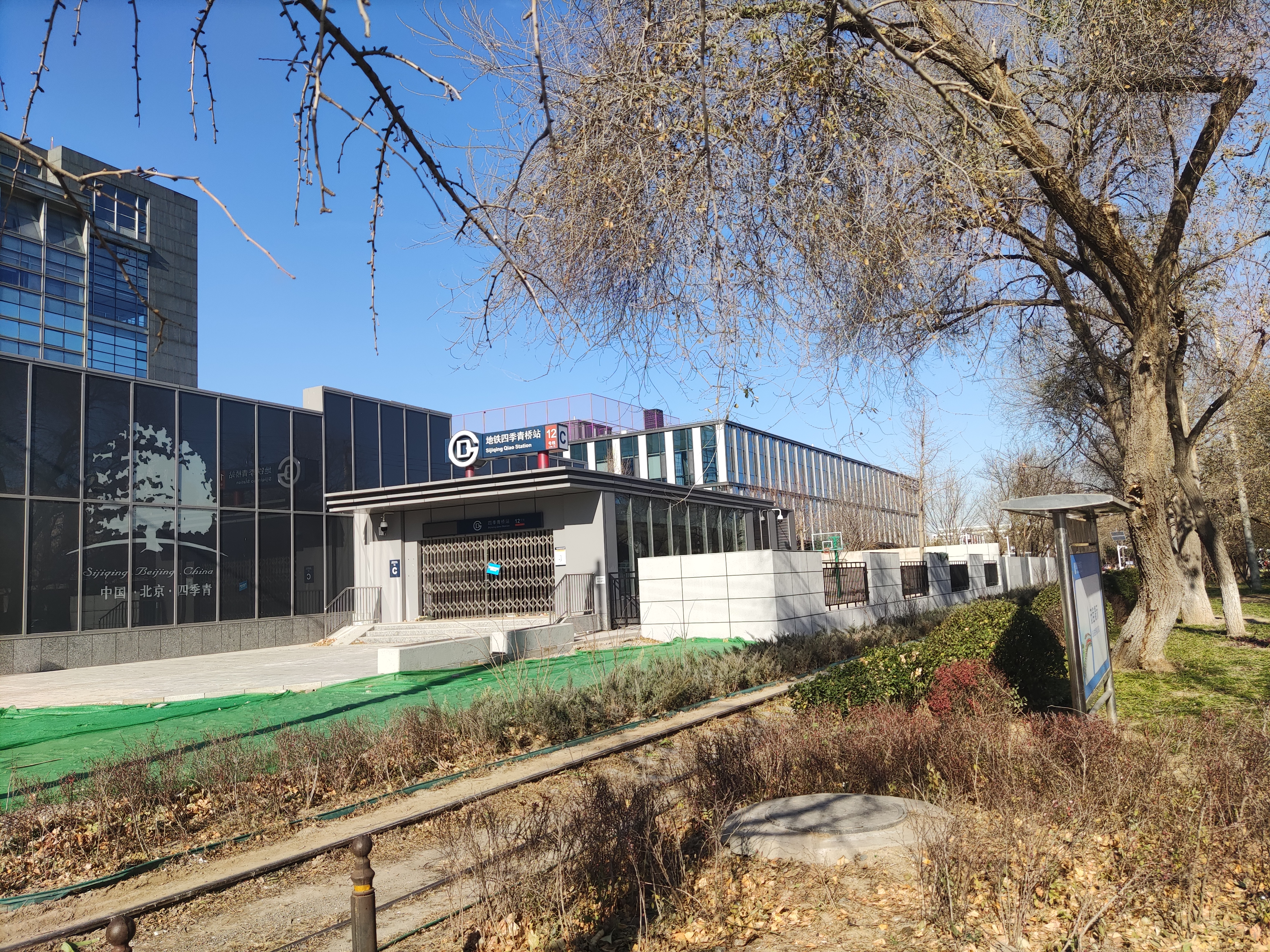
Exit C

== History ==
The station was formerly named as "Sijiqing". On 21 July 2023, the station was renamed as "Sijiqing Qiao".

On October 25, 2021, Sui Zhenjiang, then vice mayor of Beijing, conducted a survey at the station, pointing out that the groundwater level of the station had risen by about 11 meters compared with the survey in 2017, which was a test for the safety of subway construction.

== Future development ==
It is proposed to extend Line 12 from here to Haidian Wuluju station to connect to Line 6.
