= Dongbabei station =

Beijing Subway Line 3 and Line 12 station

Dongbabei 东坝北
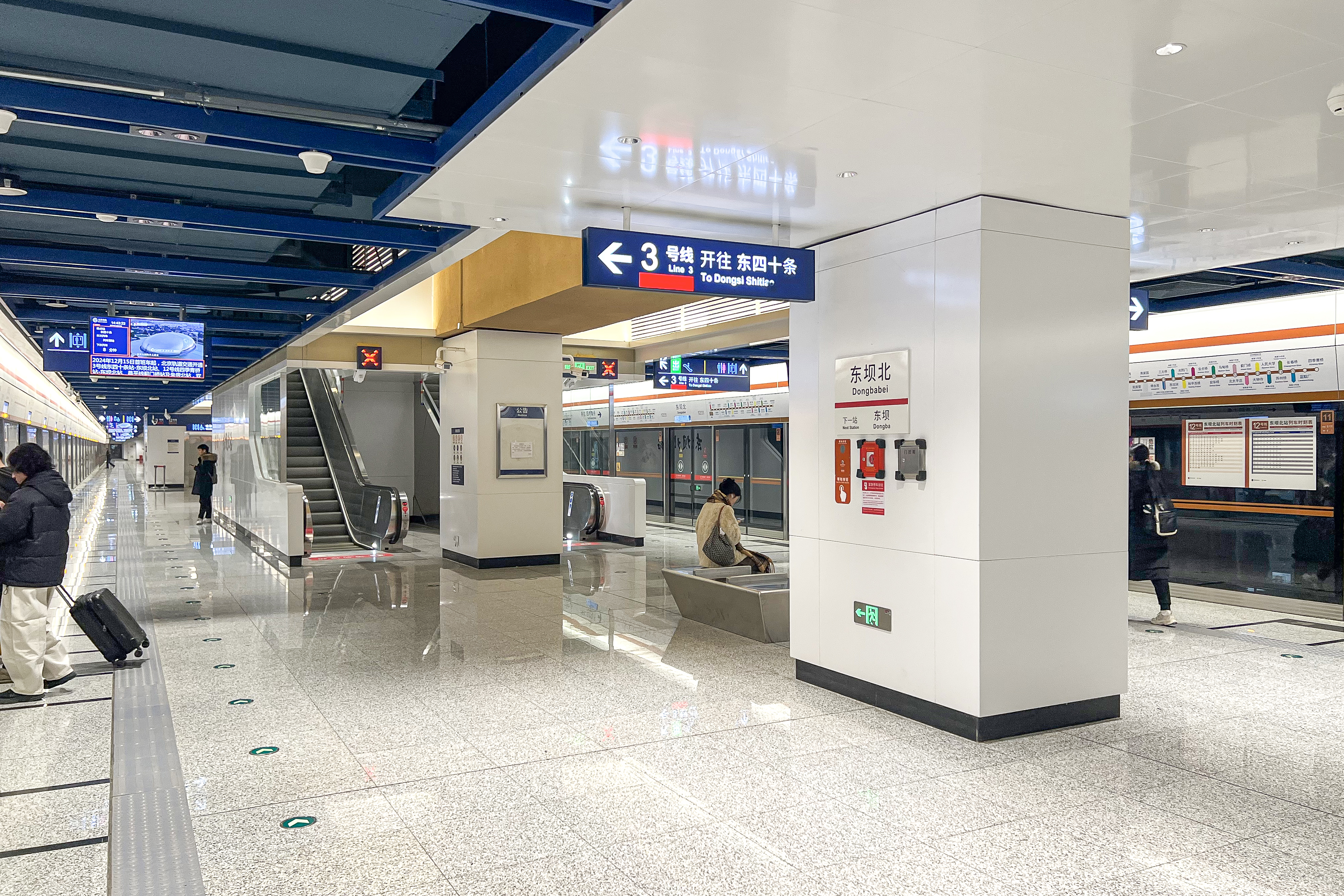
- Platform

General information
- Location: Dongfeng Village (东风村); Dongba Area, Chaoyang, Beijing; China
- Coordinates: 39.97468°N 116.55127°E
- Operator: Beijing Mass Transit Railway Operation Corporation Limited
- Lines: Line 3; Line 12
- Platforms: 4 (2 island platforms)
- Tracks: 4

Construction
- Structure type: Underground
- Accessible: Yes

History
- Opened: December 15, 2024; 20 months ago
- Former names: Dongfeng (东风)

Services
Preceding station	Beijing Subway	Following station
Dongba towards Dongsi Shitiao	Line 3	Terminus
Dongbaxi towards Sijiqing Qiao	Line 12	Terminus
Location
- Location within Beijing

Dongbabei station (Chinese: 东坝北站; pinyin: Dōngbà Běi zhàn) is an interchange station between Lines 3 and 12 of Beijing Subway. It opened on December 15, 2024. The station serves as the eastern terminus of both lines.

== Location ==
The station is located in Dongfeng Village, Dongba Area, Chaoyang, Beijing.

The Dongba Depot of Lines 3 and 12 is located to the northwest of the station.

== Exits ==
The station is planned to have 6 exits, lettered A to F. Only Exits A and F have opened with the opening of the station, the remaining 4 exits will be built within the sunken square next to the station.

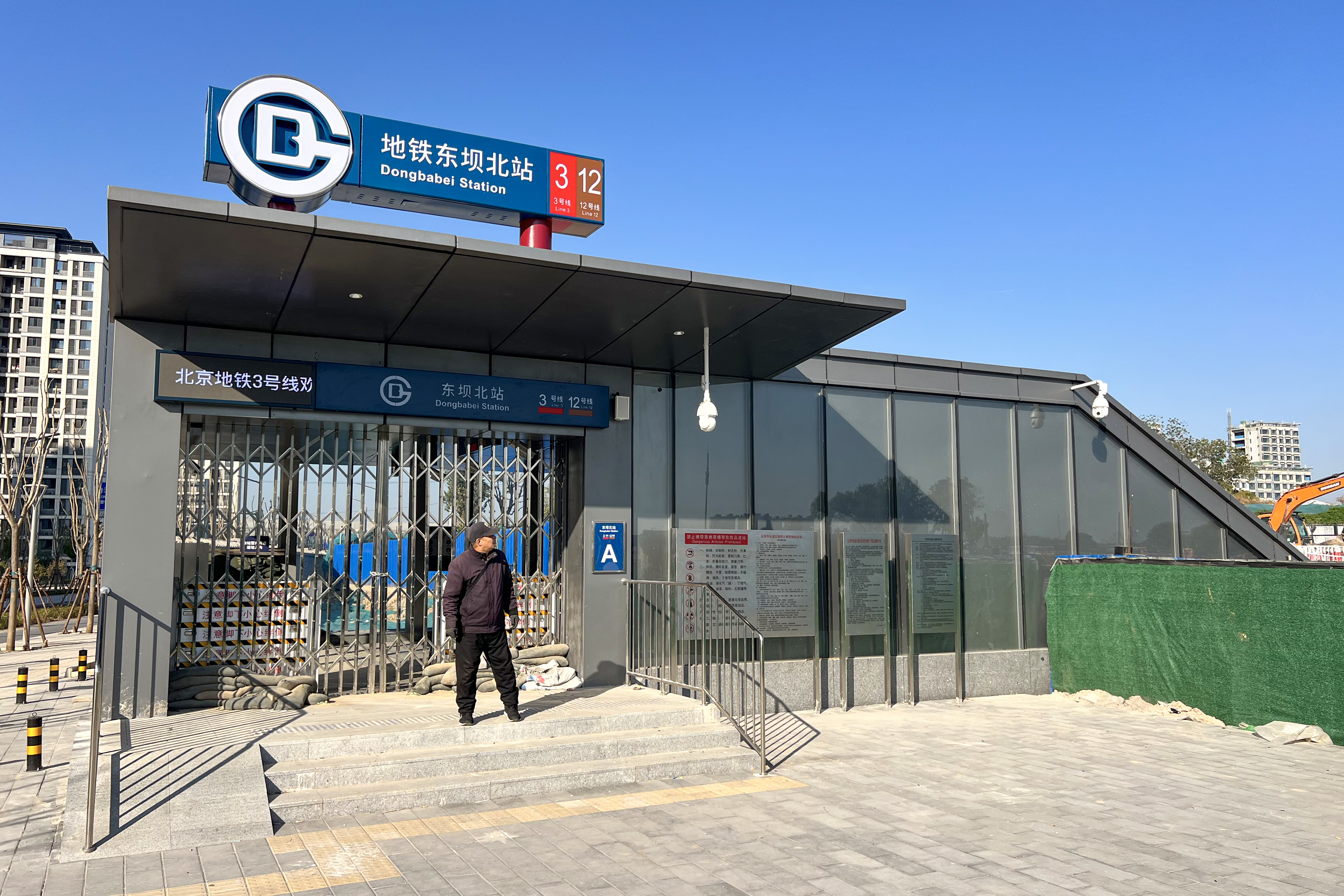
Exit A

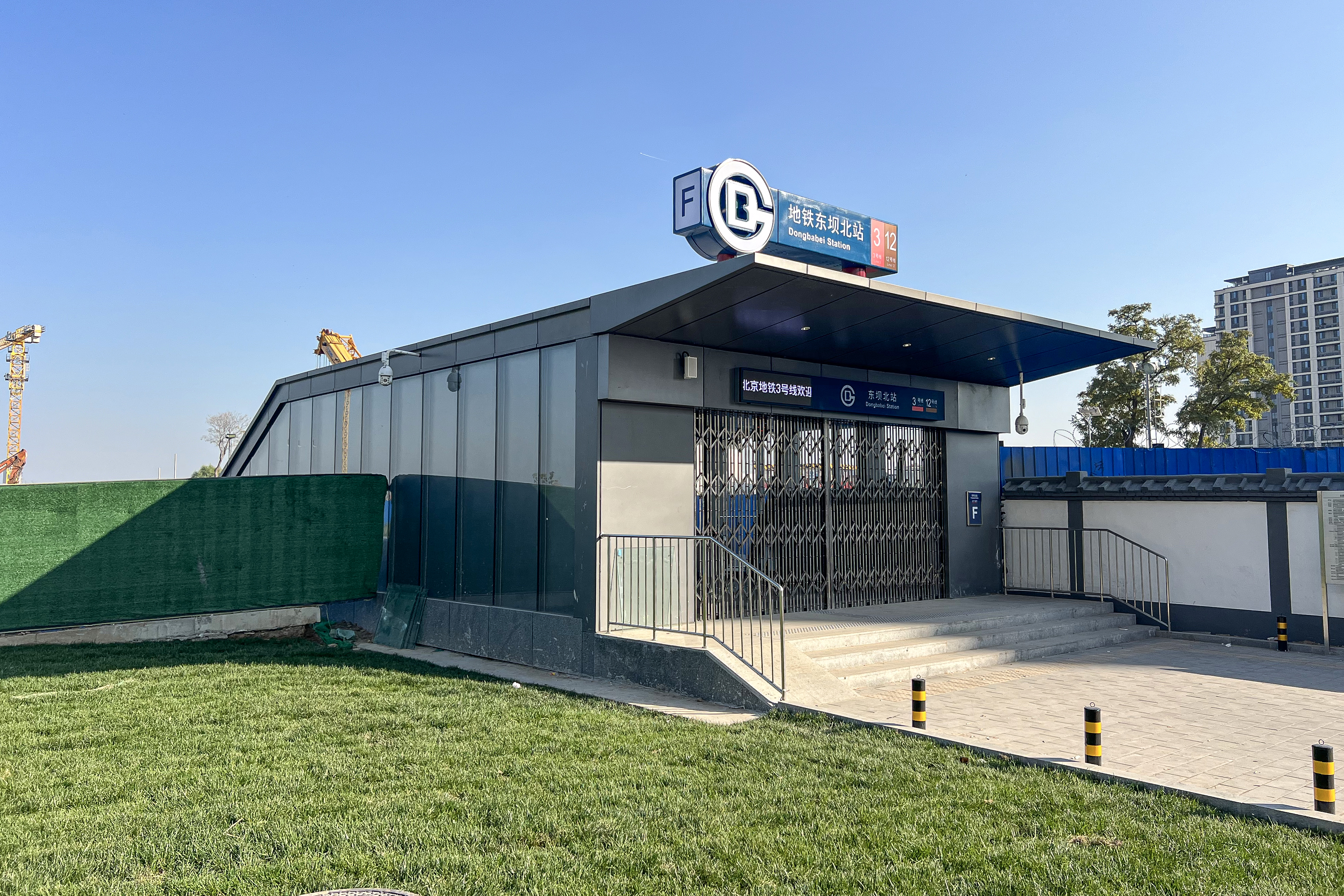
Exit F

== History ==
The station was previously named as Dongfeng station. In July 2023, the station was renamed as Dongbabei.

== Gallery ==
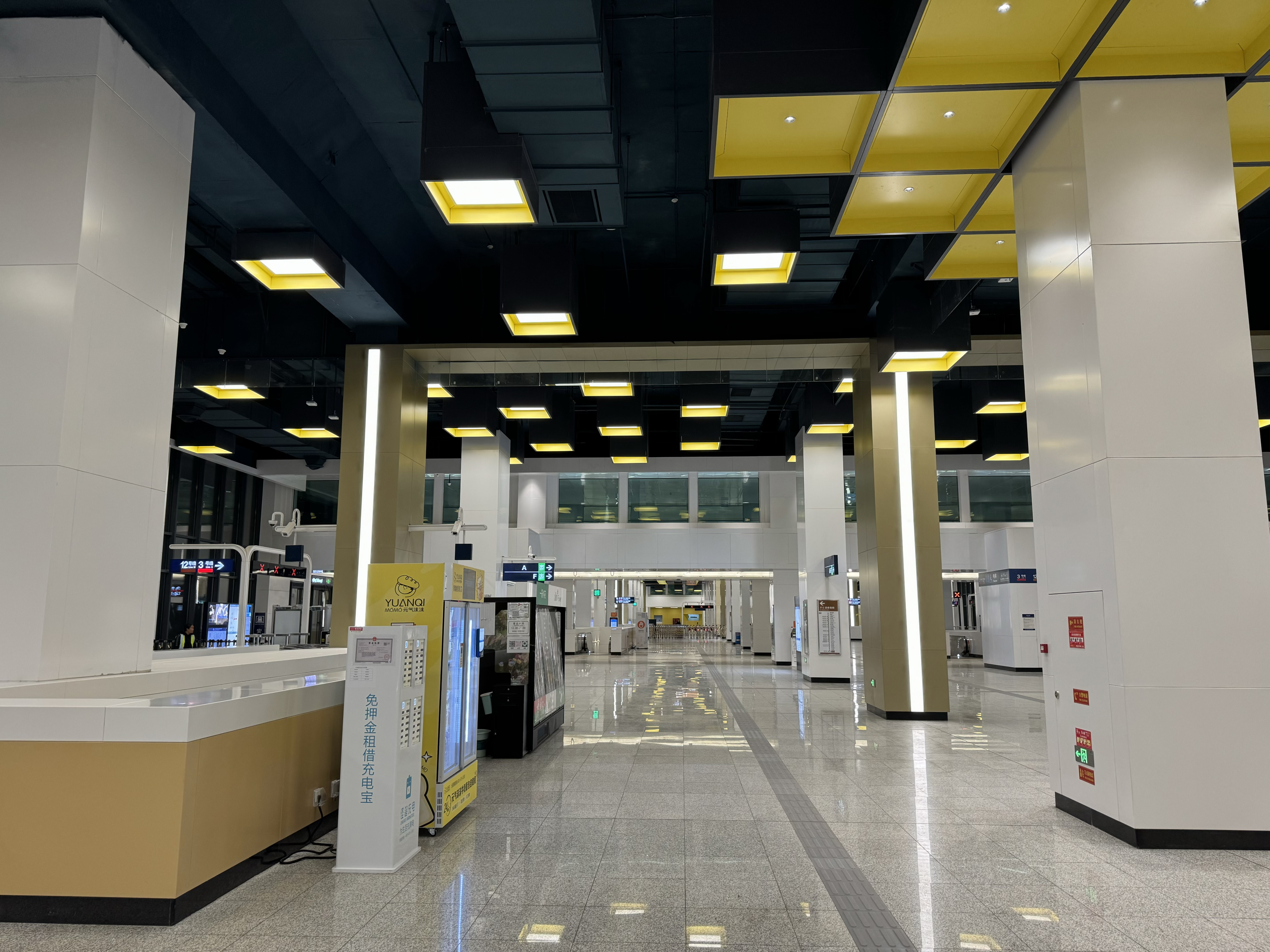
Concourse

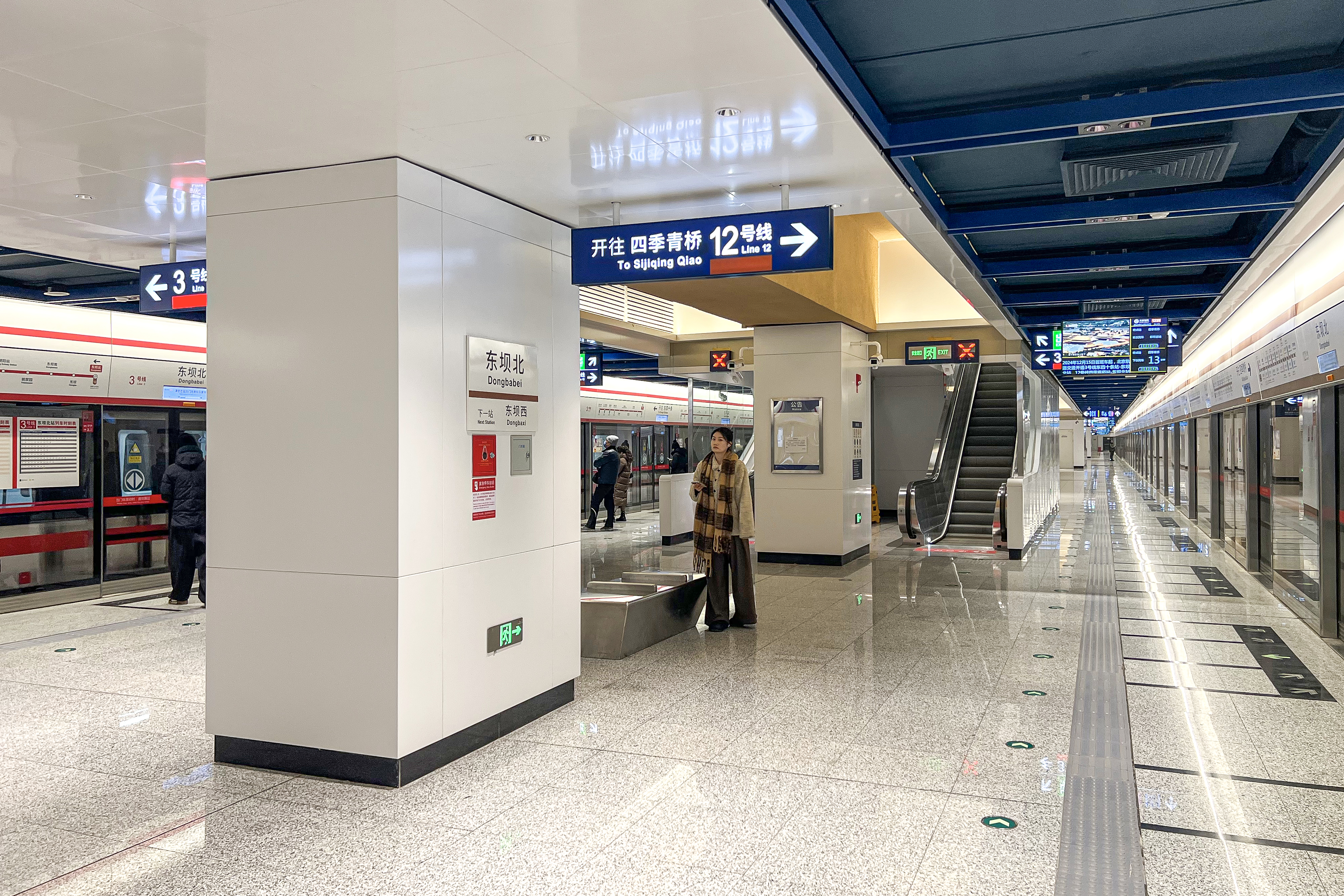
Line 12 originating platform

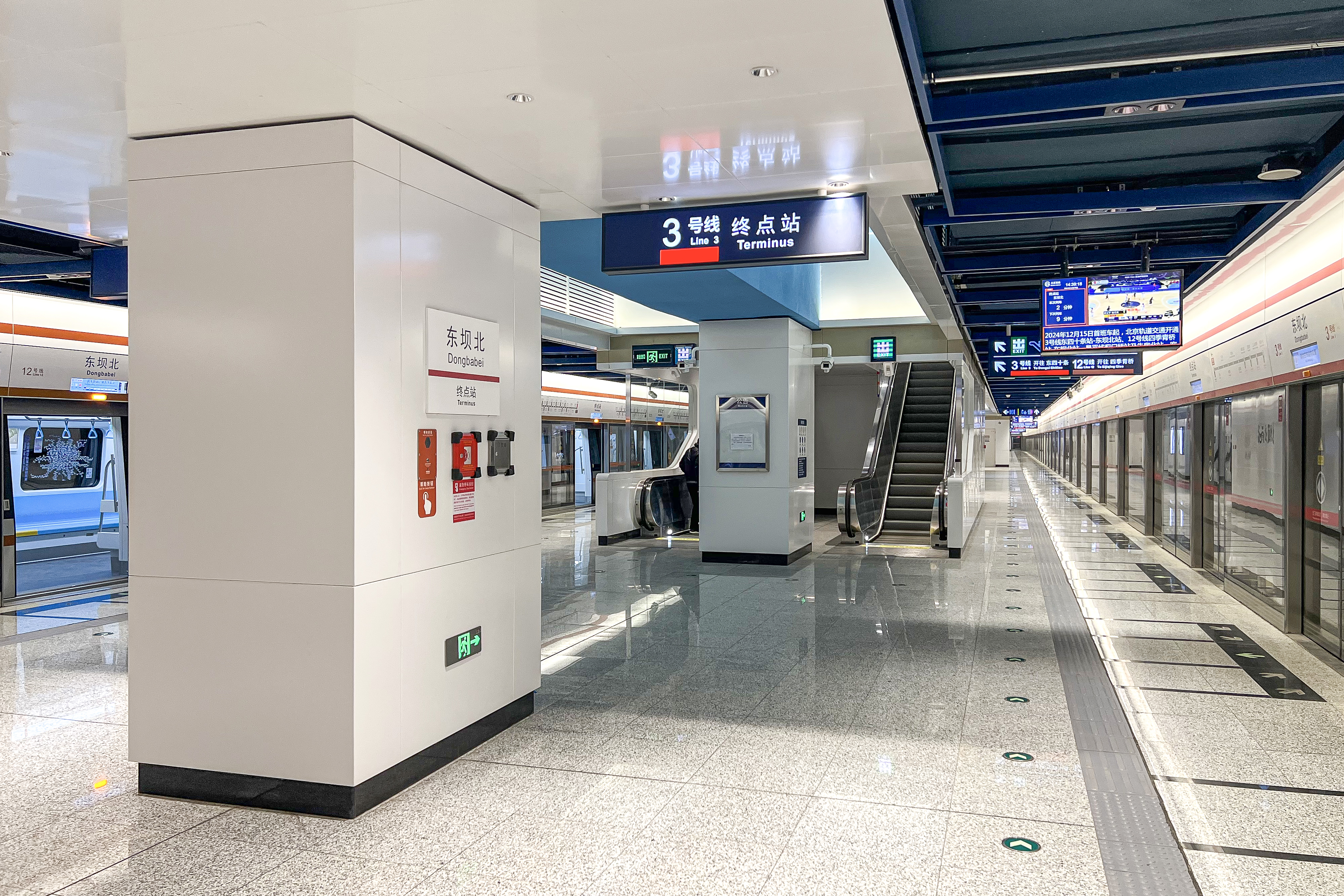
Line 3 terminating platform

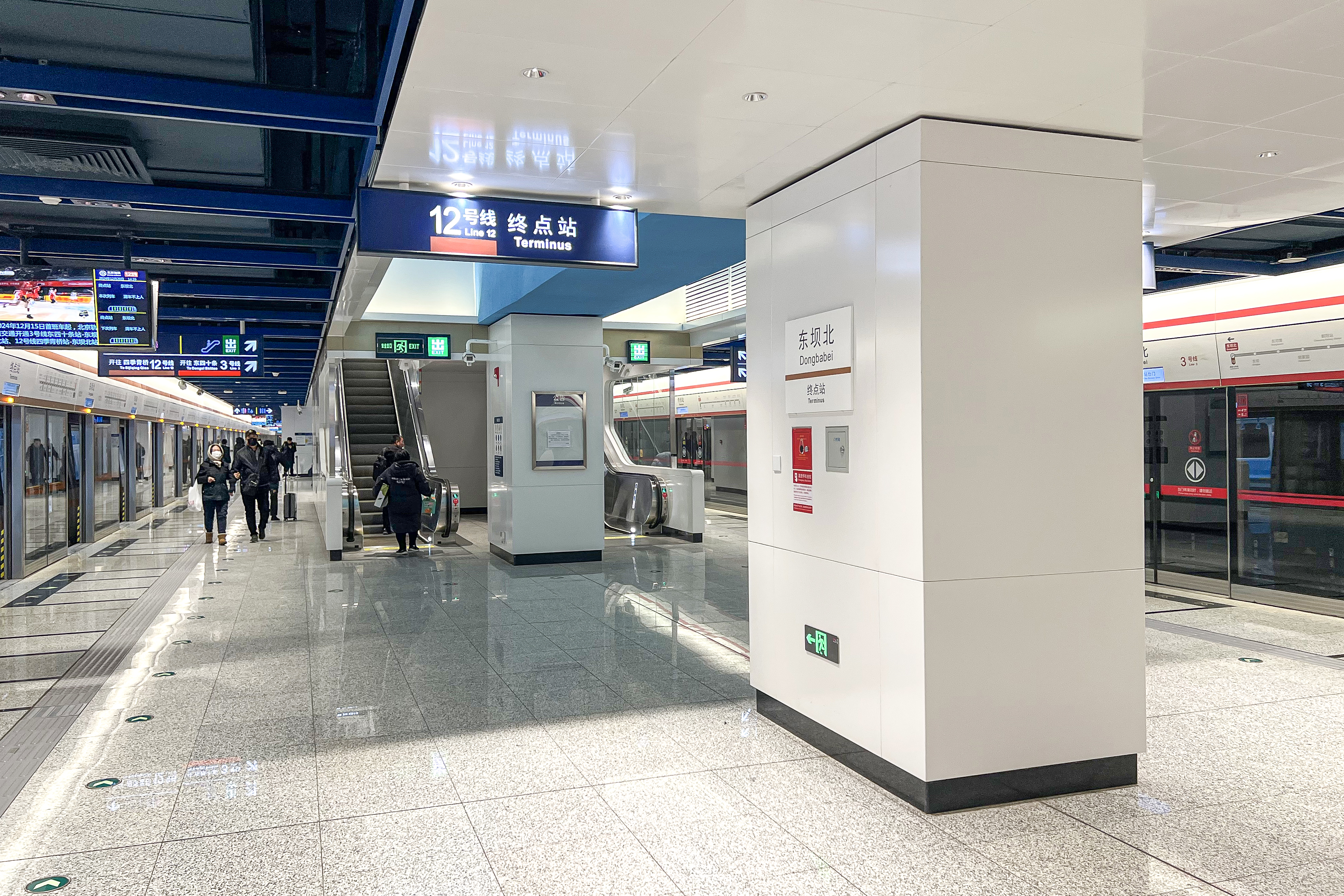
Line 12 terminating platform

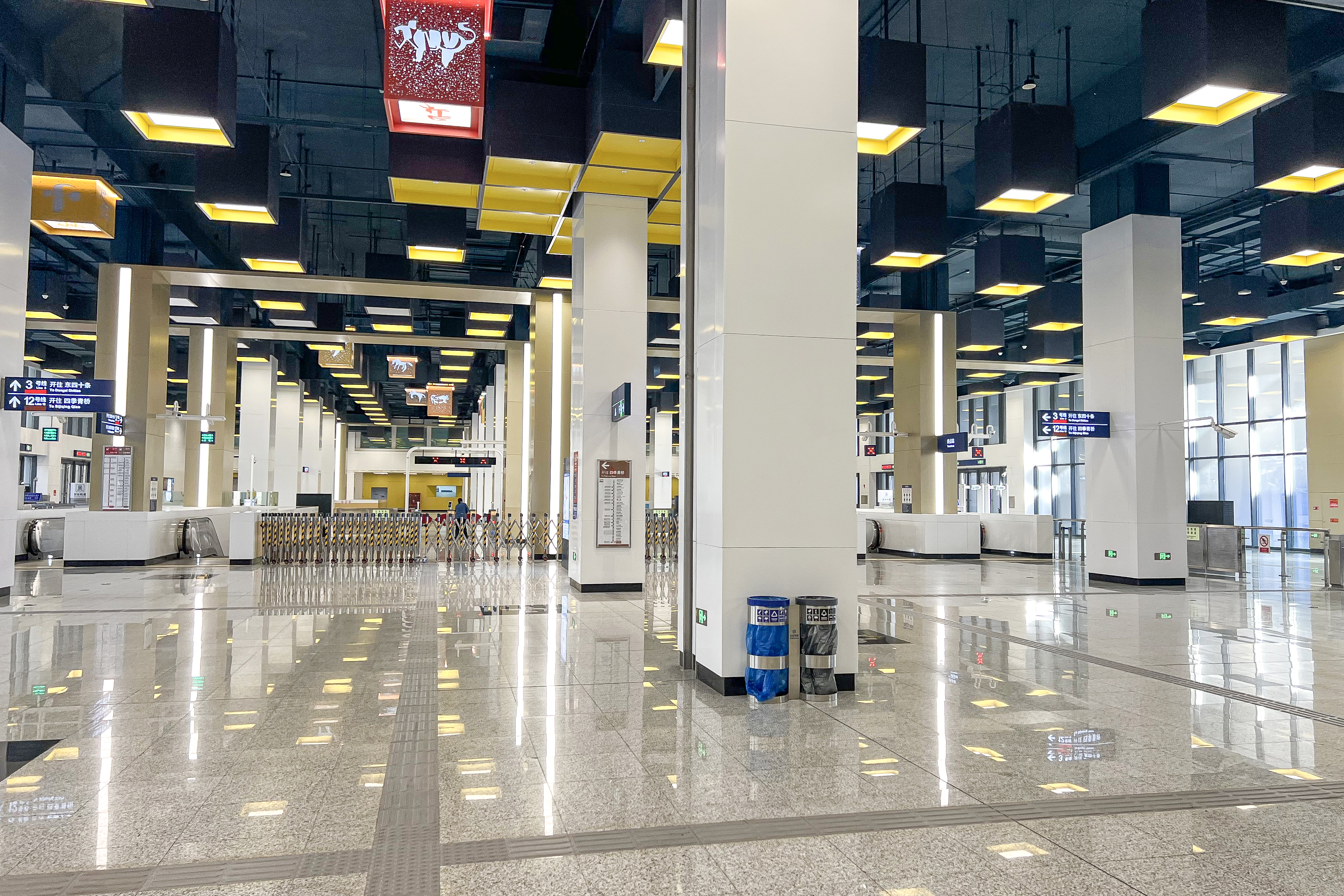
Concourse (ground level, looking east)

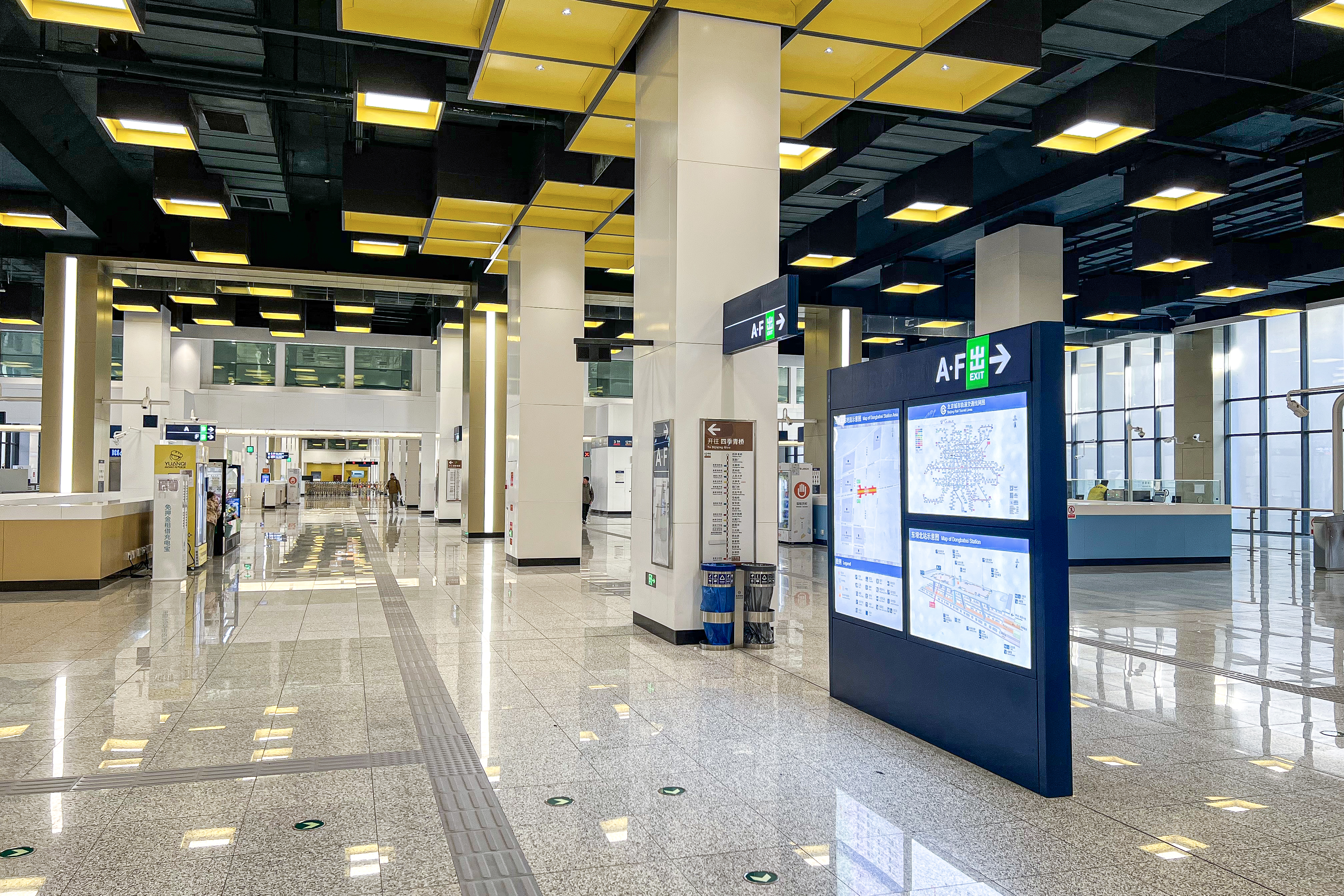
Concourse (ground level)
