= Landianchang station =

Beijing Subway Line 12 station

Landianchang 蓝靛厂
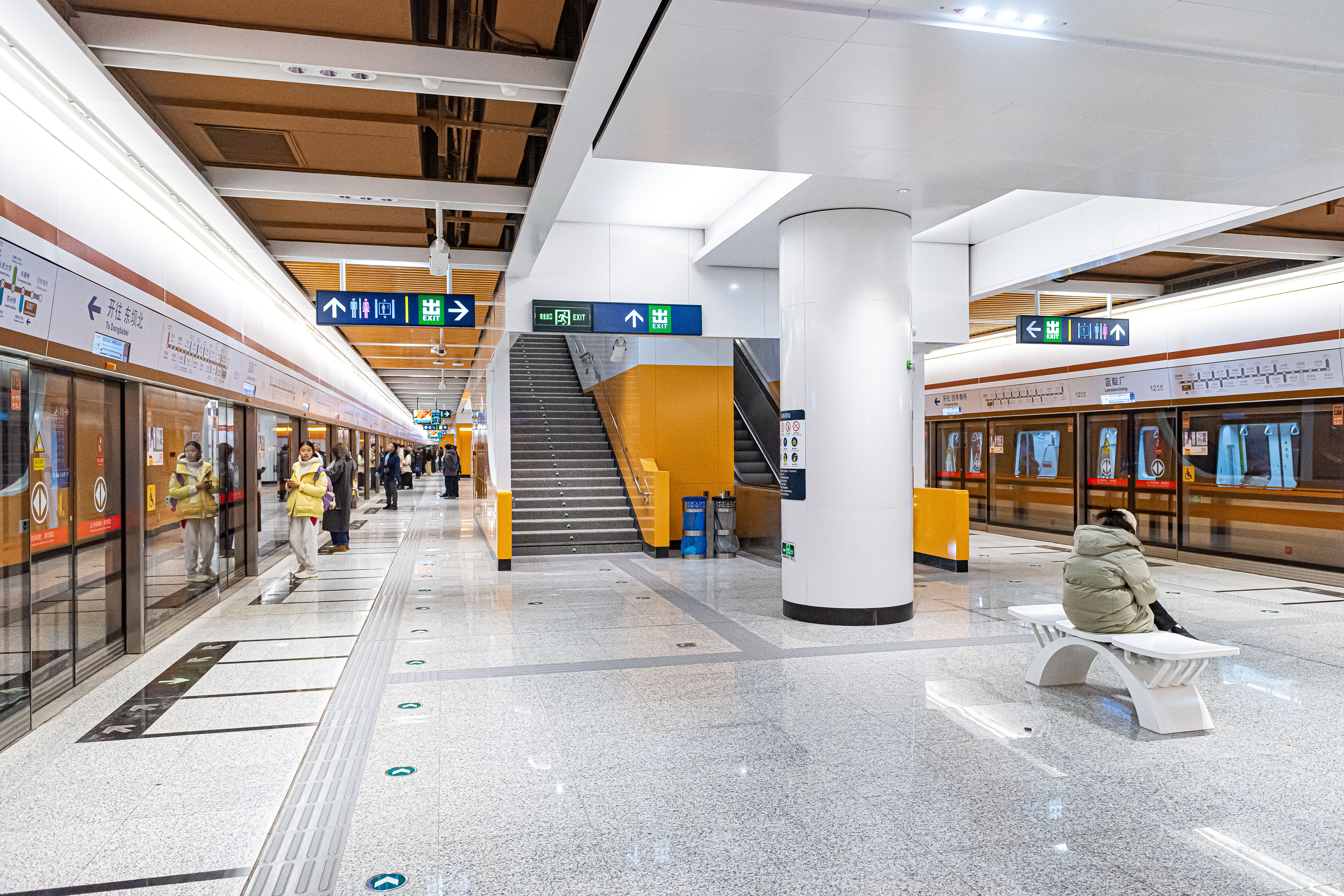
- Platform

Chinese name
- Simplified Chinese: 蓝靛厂站
- Traditional Chinese: 藍靛廠站
Transcriptions
Standard Mandarin
- Hanyu Pinyin: Lándiànchǎng zhàn

General information
- Location: Intersection between Yuanda Road (远大路), Landianchang West Road (蓝靛厂西路) and Yuanda West Road (远大西路), Shuguang Subdistrict; Haidian District, Beijing; China
- Coordinates: 39°57′21″N 116°16′36″E
- Operator: Beijing Mass Transit Railway Operation Corporation Limited
- Line: Line 12
- Platforms: 2 (1 island platform)
- Tracks: 2

Construction
- Structure type: Underground
- Accessible: Yes

History
- Opened: December 15, 2024; 20 months ago
- Former names: Yuandalu (远大路)

Services
Preceding station	Beijing Subway	Following station
Sijiqing Qiao Terminus	Line 12	Changchun Qiao towards Dongbabei
Location
- Location within Beijing

Landianchang station (simplified Chinese: 蓝靛厂站; traditional Chinese: 藍靛廠站; pinyin: Lándiànchǎng zhàn) is a station on Line 12 of the Beijing Subway. It opened on December 15, 2024.

== Location ==
It is located under the intersection between Yuanda Road, Landianchang West Road and Yuanda West Road, in Shuguang Subdistrict, Haidian, Beijing.

== Station features ==
The station has an underground island platform.

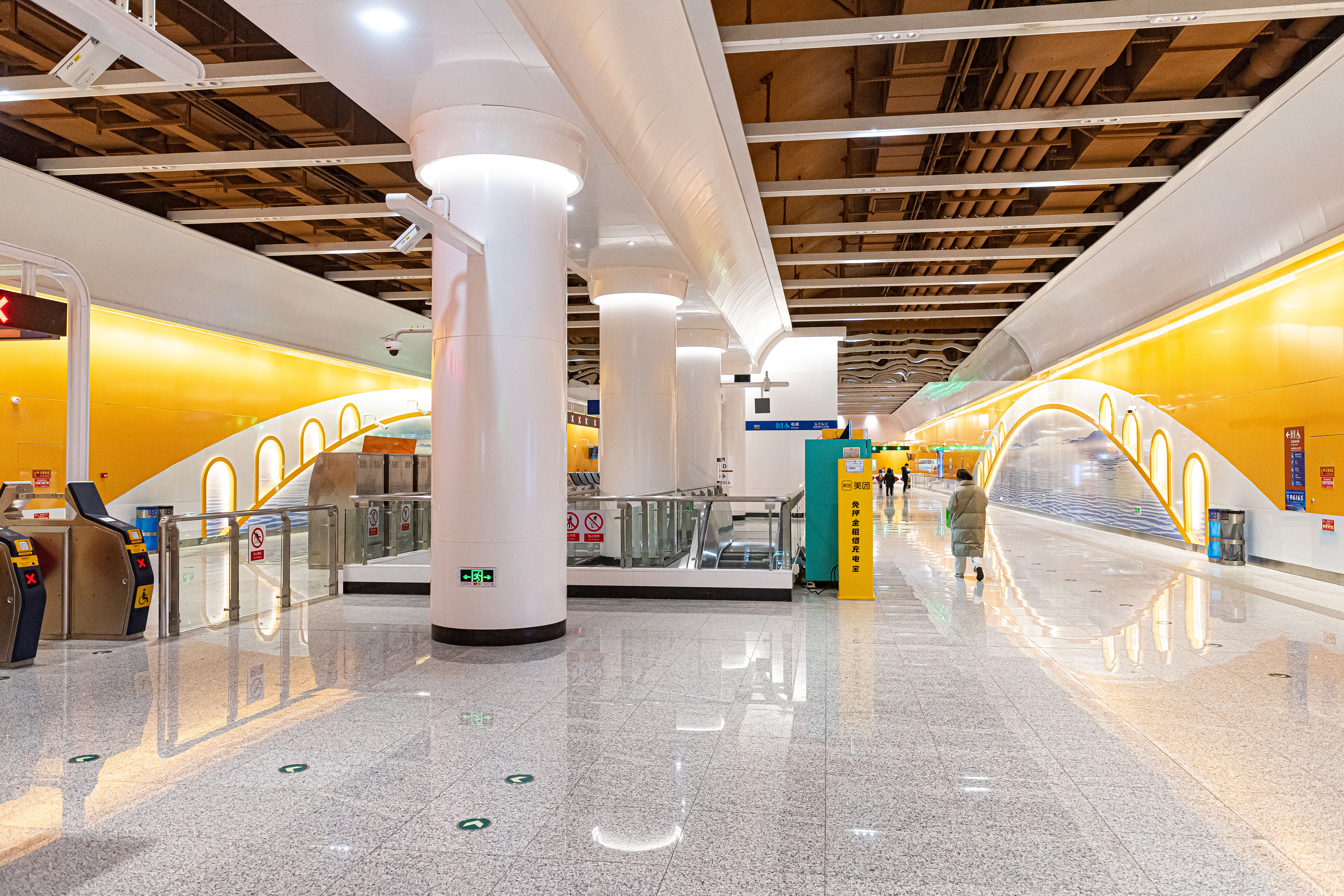
Concourse

== Exits ==
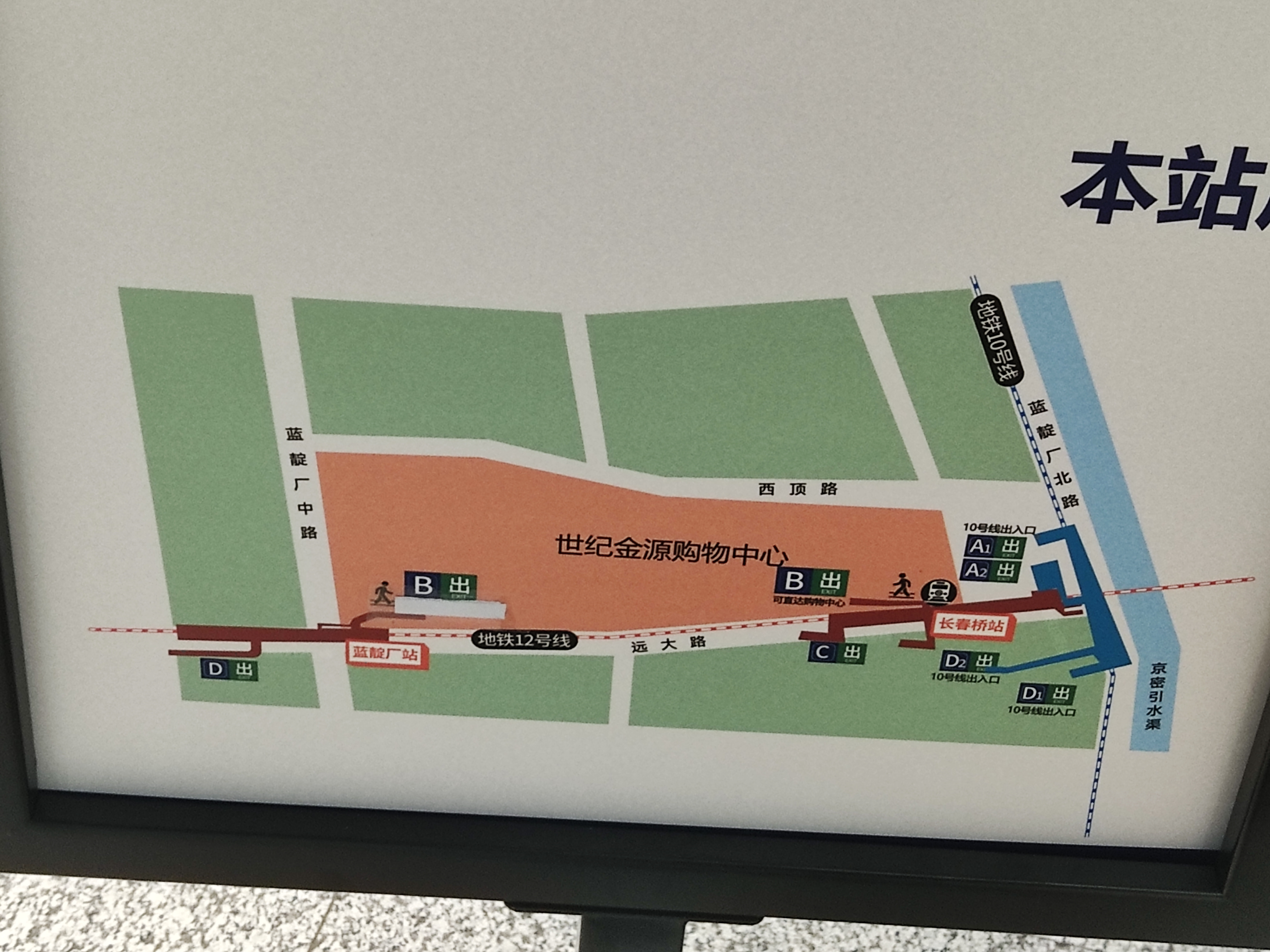
Notice about the connection to Golden Resources Shopping Mall.

There are two exits, lettered B and D. Exit B has an accessible elevator.

There is also an exit to the Golden Resources Shopping Mall in the passageway of Exit B, but due to the upcoming renovation of the western area of the shopping center in the spring of 2025, this underground exit will not be opened with this station.

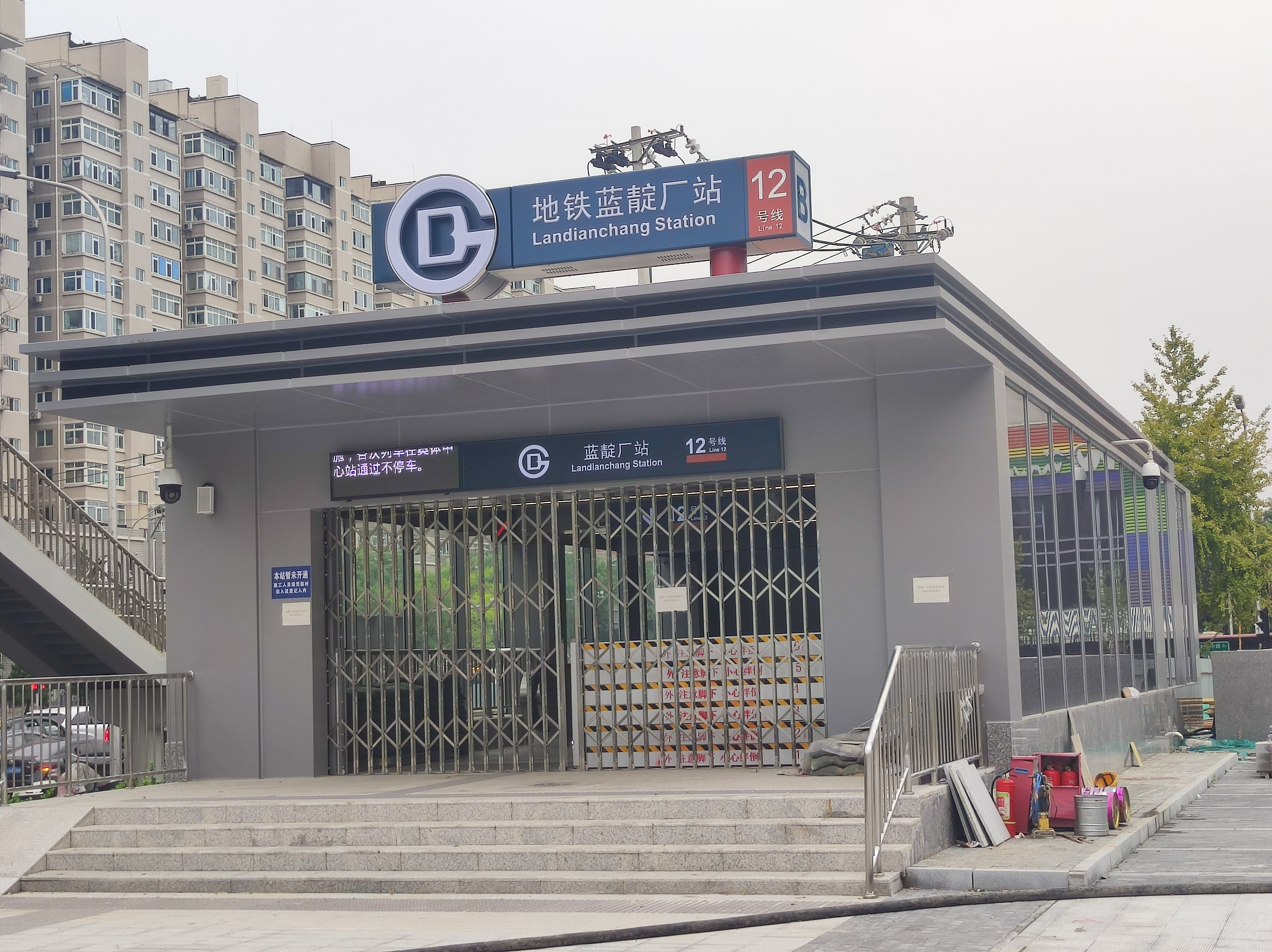
Exit B

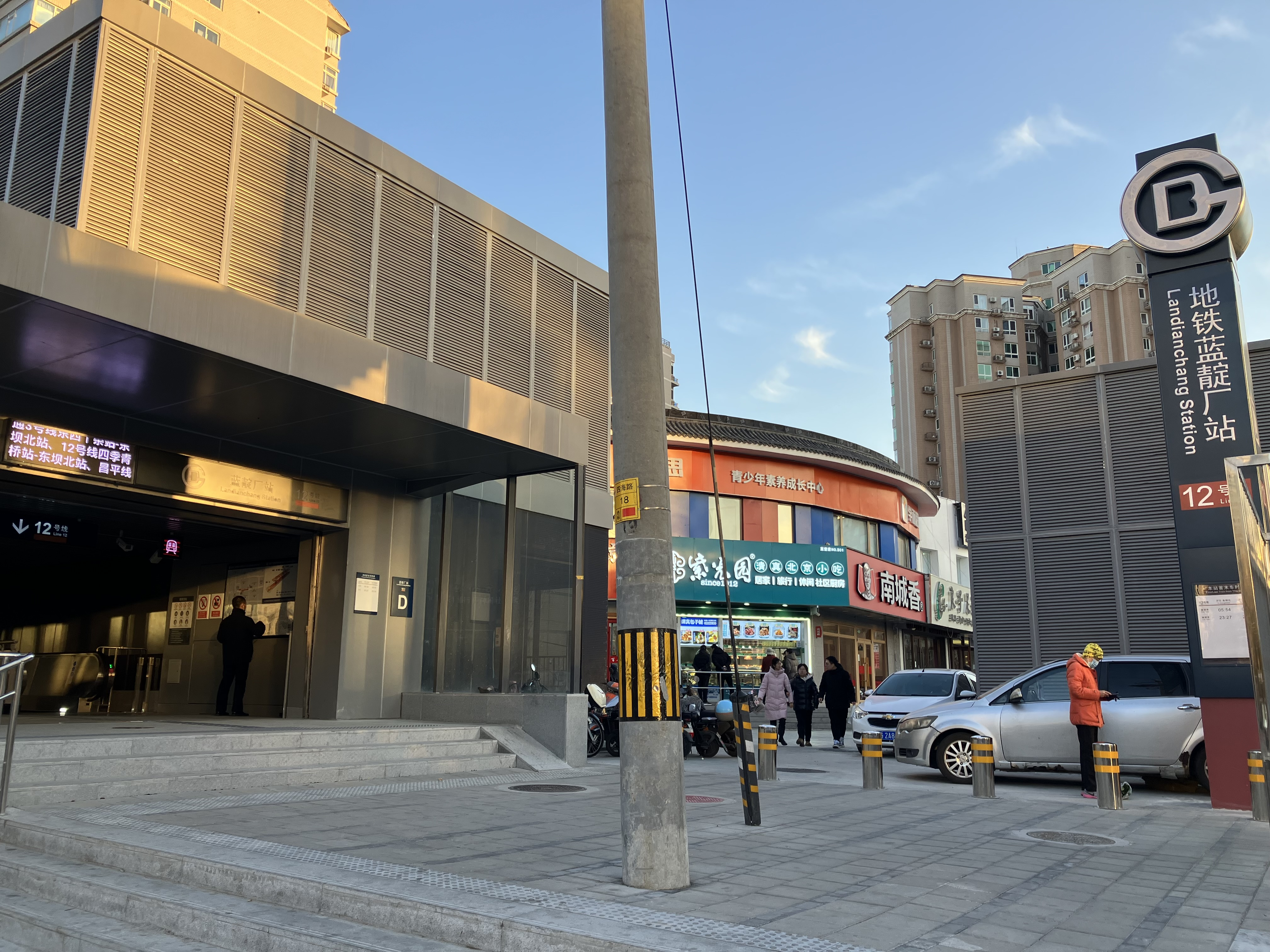
Exit D

== History ==
The station was previously named as Yuandalu (Chinese: 远大路; pinyin: Yuǎndàlù). It was proposed to be renamed to Landianchang on July 21, 2023, before being officially renamed on January 3, 2024.

== Nearby ==
- Golden Resources Mall
