= Golden Resources Mall =

Coordinates: 39°57′26″N 116°16′57″E

Golden Resources Mall 金源时代购物中心
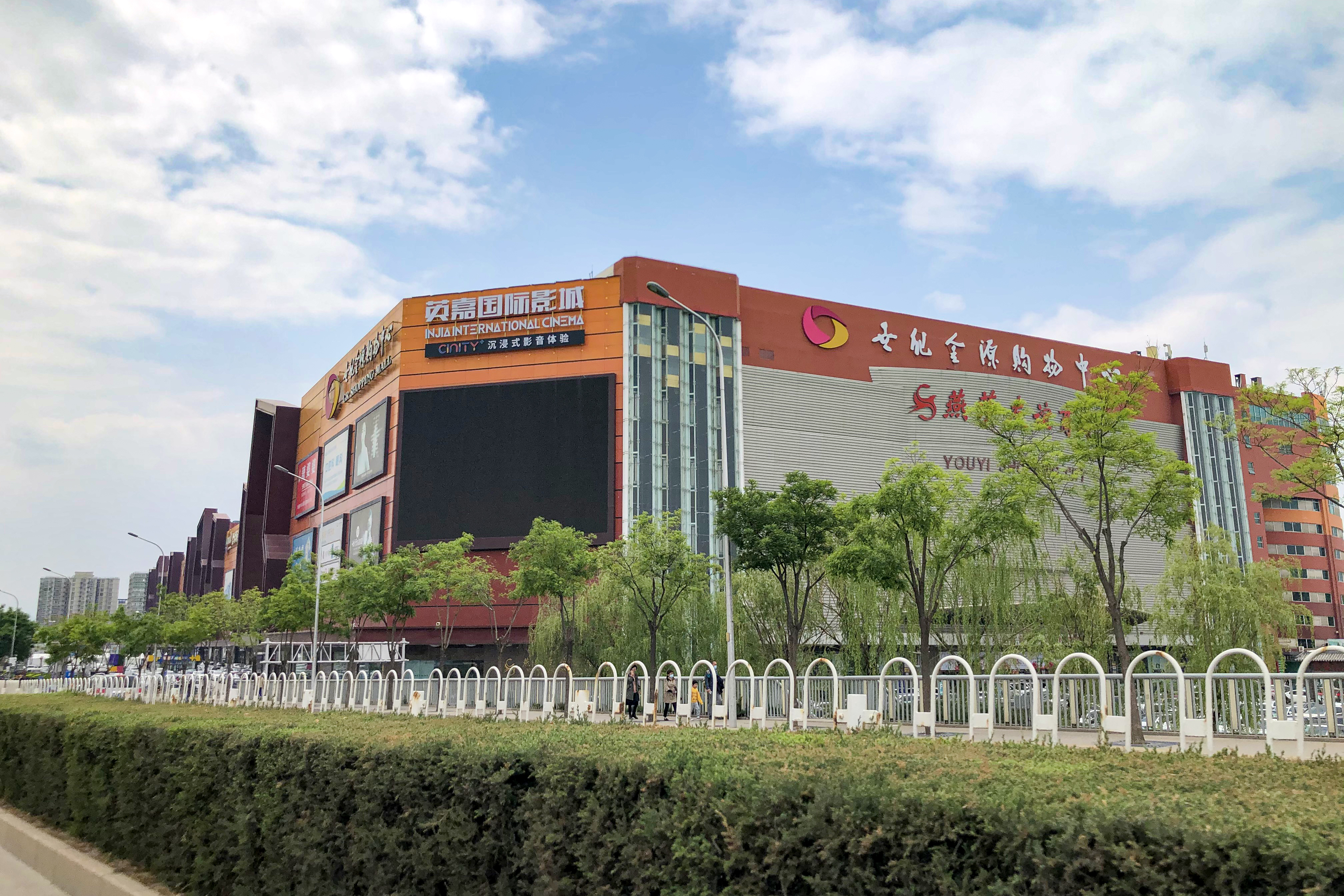
- East facade of the Golden Resources Mall in Beijing
- Location: Yuanda Road, Shuguang Subdistrict, Haidian District, Beijing, China
- Opened: 24 October 2004; 22 years ago
- Num. of stores: 1000+
- Floor area: 557,419 square metres (6,000,010 sq ft)

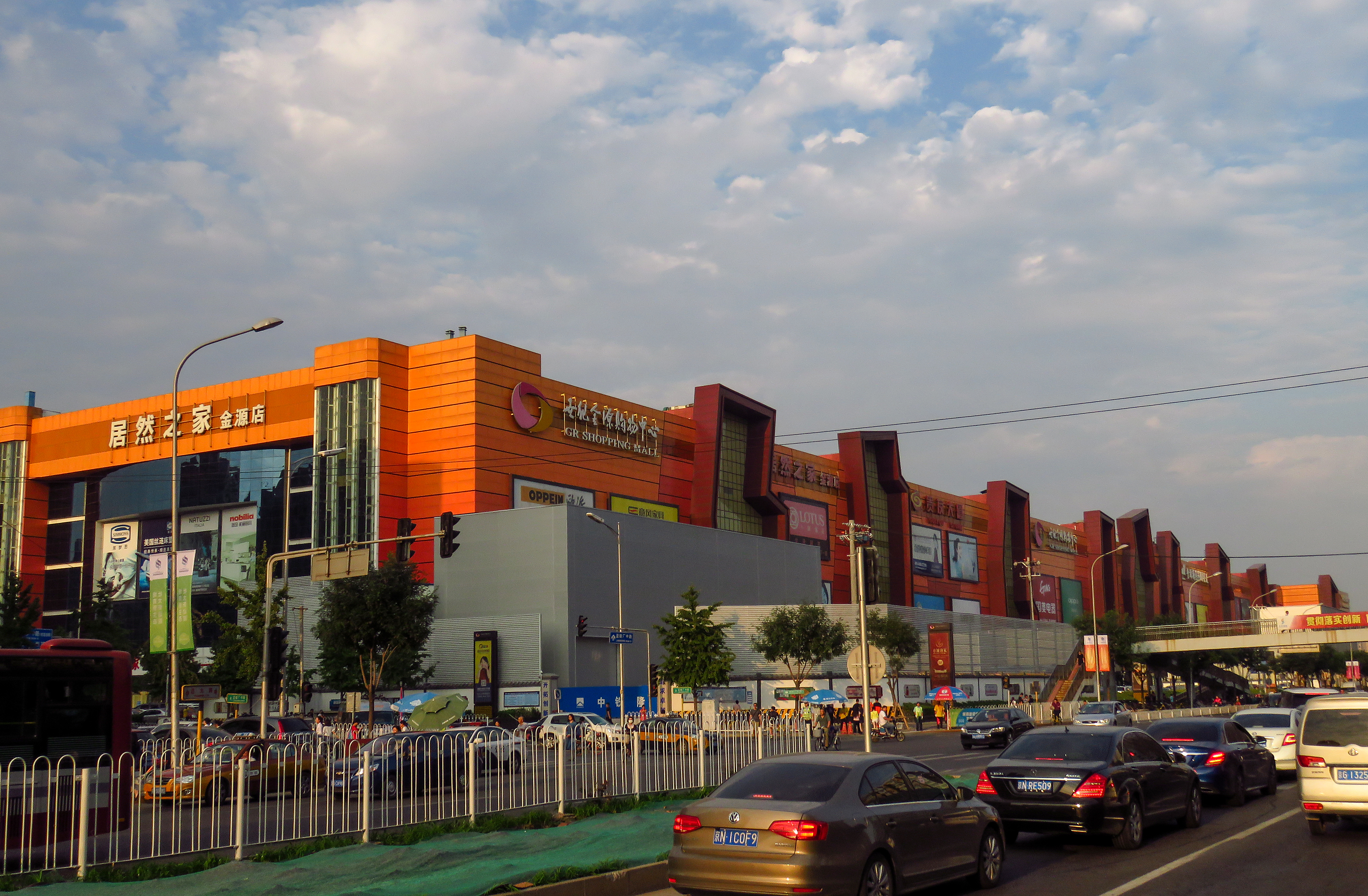
Daytime view from the west

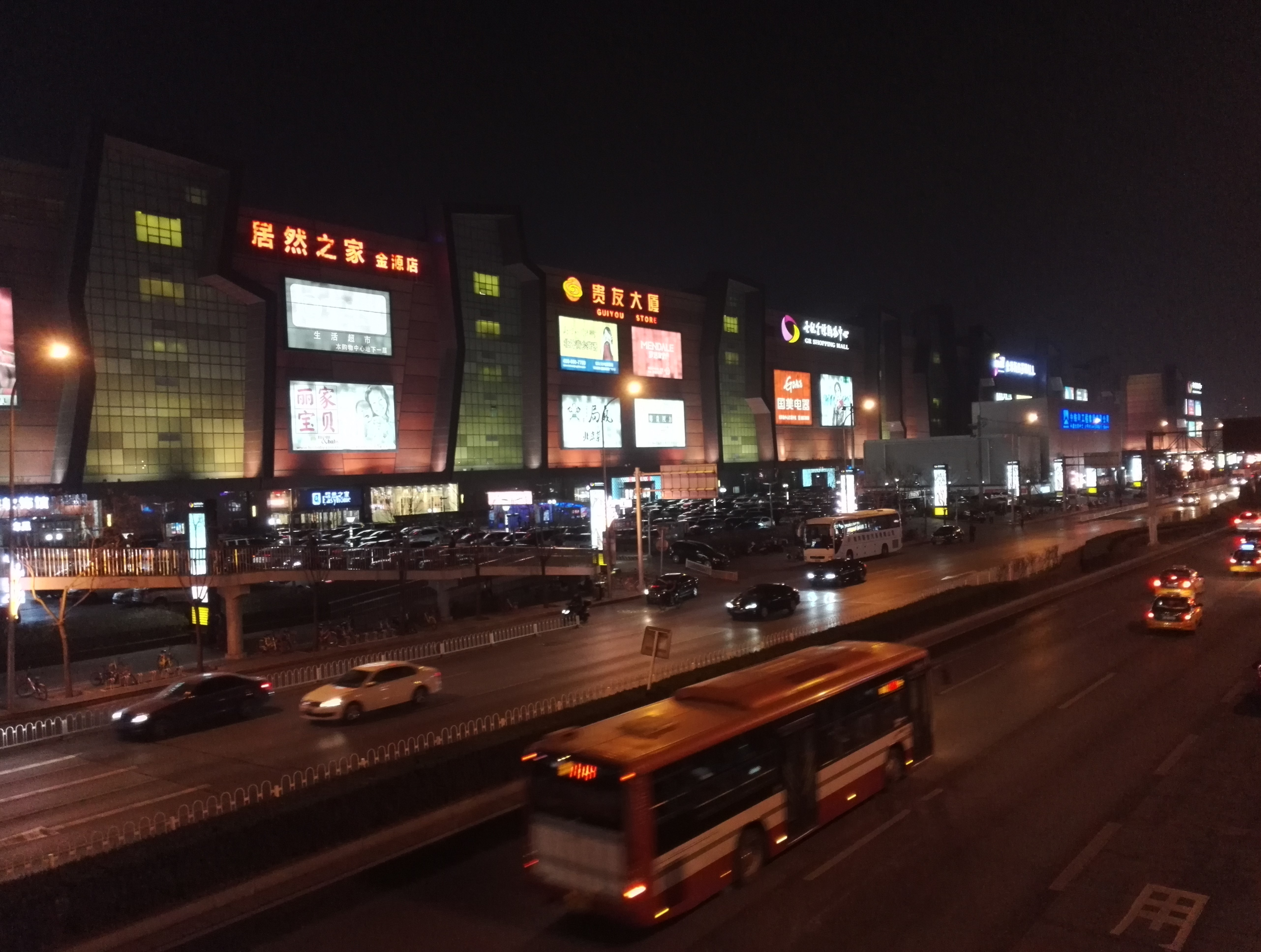
Night view from the west

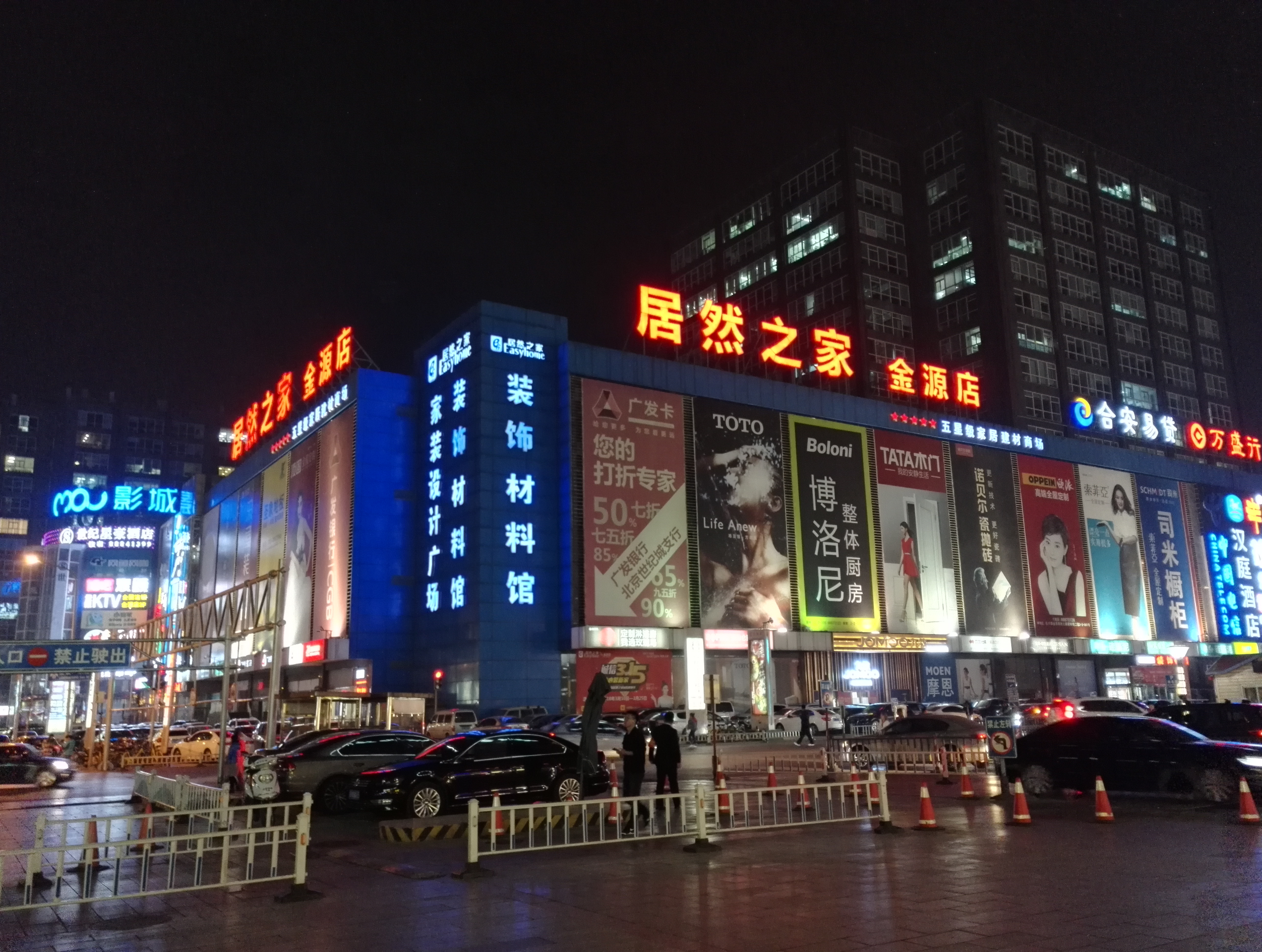
Phase 2 of the Golden Resources Mall Across the street

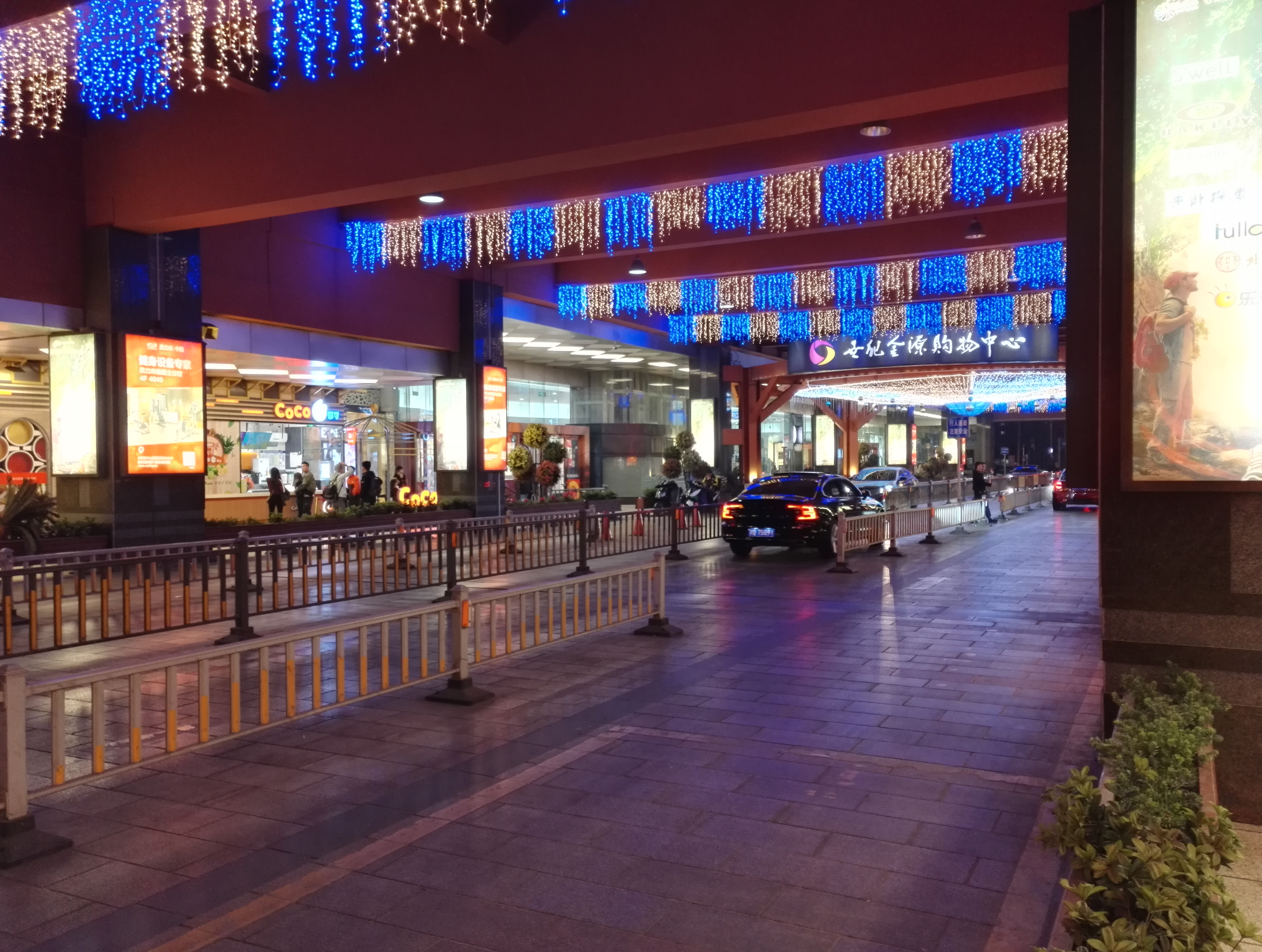
Road passing under the mall

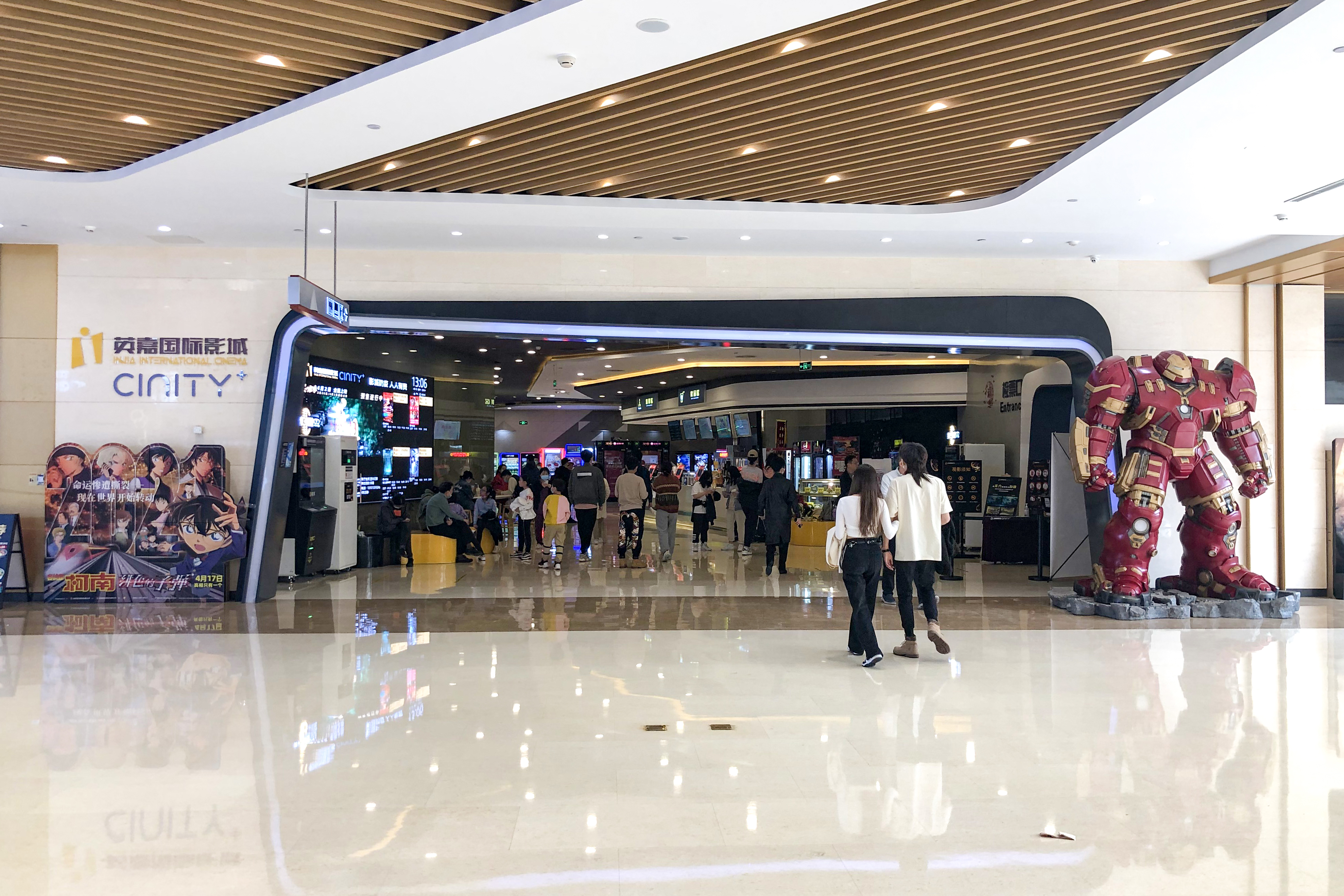
The Injia International Cinema on the 5th floor

Golden Resources Shopping Mall, or Jin Yuan (abbreviated from Chinese: 金源时代购物中心) is a major shopping mall located near the northwest Fourth Ring Road in Haidian District, Beijing, People's Republic of China. It was the largest mall by gross leasable area until 2005, when South China Mall in Dongguan, China was completed. It can be accessed by the Beijing Subway using Changchun Qiao station (Lines 10 & 12) or Landianchang station (Line 12).

In older English reports in 2000s, the mall was nicknamed "Great Mall of China" due to its total area of 560,000 square metres (6 million square feet) over six floors. At 1.5 times the size of the Mall of America, Golden Resources Mall was the world's largest shopping mall from 2004 to 2005.

The mall opened on 24 October 2004. Footfall had been estimated at 50,000 a day, but upon opening was as small as 20 in an hour. At the time, prices were far beyond the purchasing ability of most ordinary Chinese, and the mall was relatively inaccessible, being located in the sparsely populated outer suburbs of Beijing between the 3rd and 4th ring road.

Fu Yuehong, general manager of the New Yansha Group which operates nearly half the mall, explains:

From the beginning we wanted the largest shopping center in the world [...] We are the country with the most people in the world. We have the fastest growing economy. The largest mall shows our progress as a society [...] We think it will take three to five years to start making a profit.

By 2022, with the growth of the Chinese middle class, and the expansion of Beijing to place the mall in its urban area surrounded by apartment complexes, the number of shoppers had increased tremendously; the mall was crowded on weekends.

== Transport ==
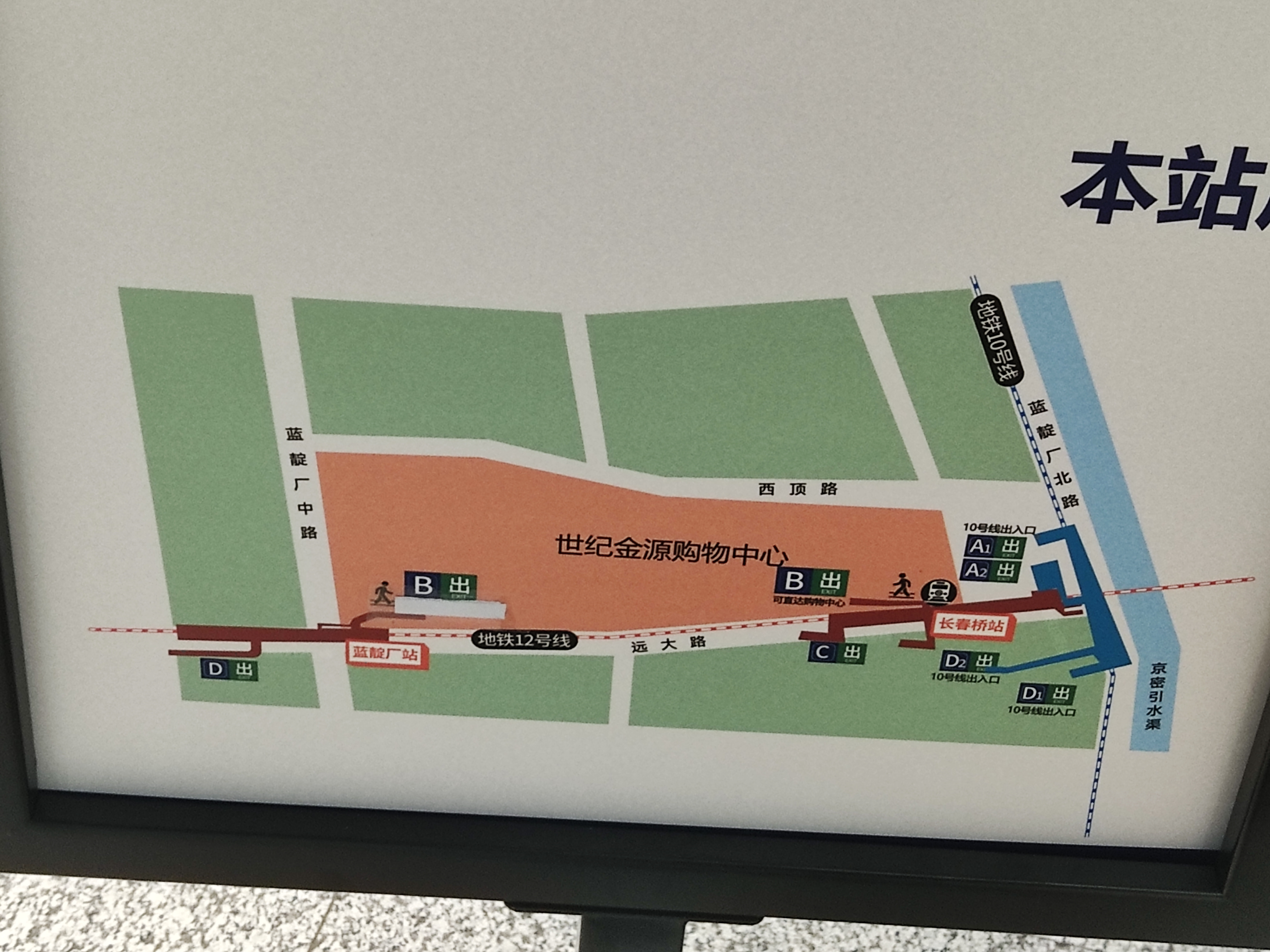
Notice about the connection to Golden Resources Shopping Mall at Changchun Qiao Station, Line 12, Beijing Subway.

The East District of the shopping mall is located near Exit B of Changchun Qiao station (Subway Lines 10 and 12), and the West District of the shopping mall is located near Exit B of Landianchang station (Subway Line 12).

== See also ==
- List of largest shopping malls in the world
- List of shopping malls in China
