= Changchun Qiao station =

Beijing Subway Line 10 and Line 12 station

Changchun Qiao 长春桥
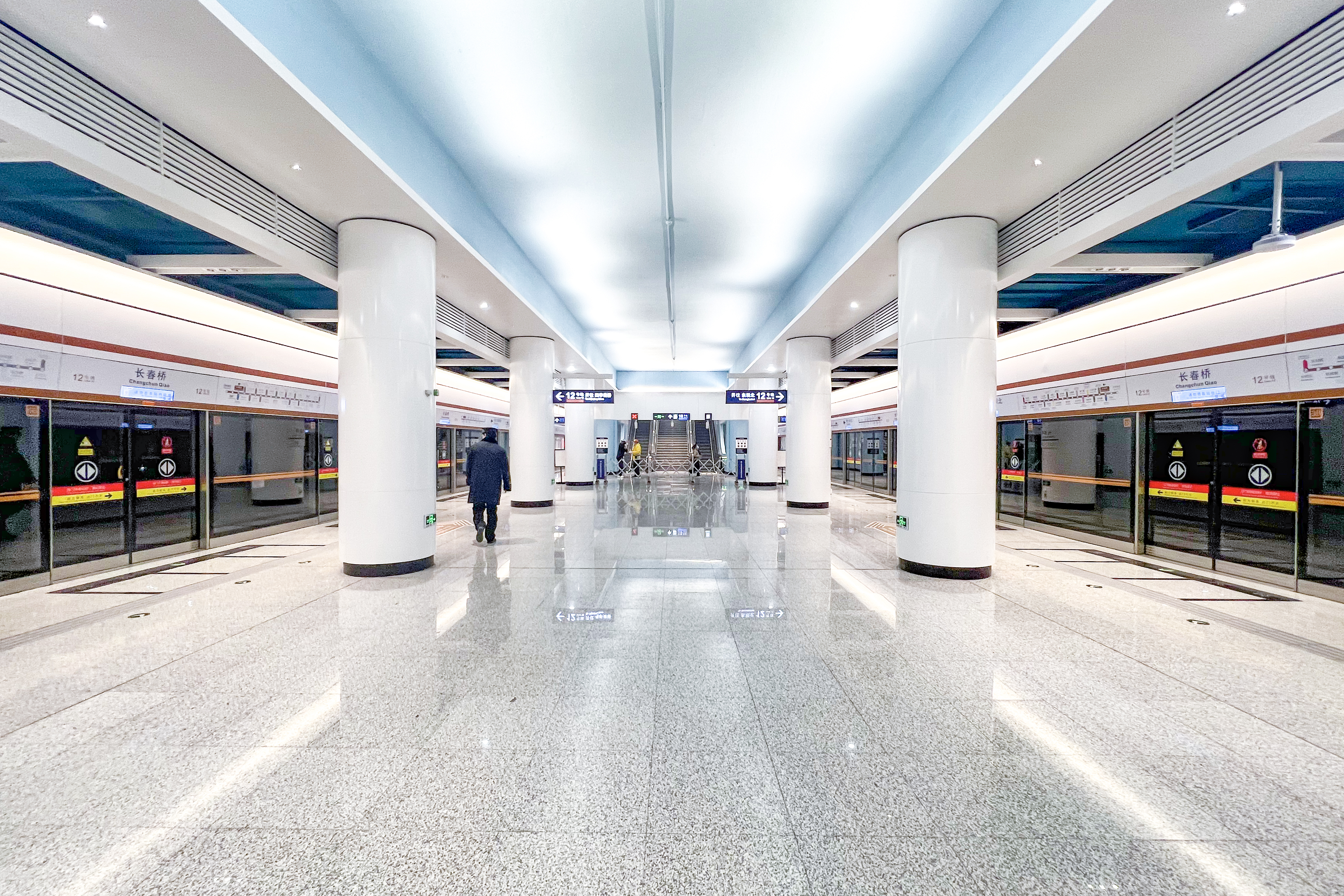
- Line 12 platform

General information
- Location: Changchun Bridge (长春桥); Landianchang North Road (蓝靛厂北路) / Landianchang South Road (蓝靛厂南路) and Yuanda Road (远大路) / Changchunqiao Road (长春桥路); Haidian District, Beijing; China
- Coordinates: 39°57′31″N 116°17′39″E
- Operator: Beijing Mass Transit Railway Operation Corporation Limited
- Lines: Line 10; Line 12
- Platforms: 4 (2 island platforms)
- Tracks: 4

Construction
- Structure type: Underground
- Accessible: Yes

History
- Opened: Line 10: December 30, 2012; 13 years ago; Line 12: December 15, 2024; 20 months ago

Services
Preceding station	Beijing Subway	Following station
Chedaogou outer loop / anticlockwise	Line 10	Huoqiying inner loop / clockwise
Landianchang towards Sijiqing Qiao	Line 12	Suzhou Qiao towards Dongbabei
Location
- Location within Beijing

Changchun Qiao station (simplified Chinese: 长春桥站; traditional Chinese: 長春橋站; pinyin: Chángchūn Qiáo zhàn) is an interchange station between Line 10 and Line 12 of the Beijing Subway. The Line 10 station opened on December 30, 2012. The Line 12 station opened on December 15, 2024.

== Station layout ==
The station has underground island platforms for both Line 10 and Line 12.

== Location and name ==
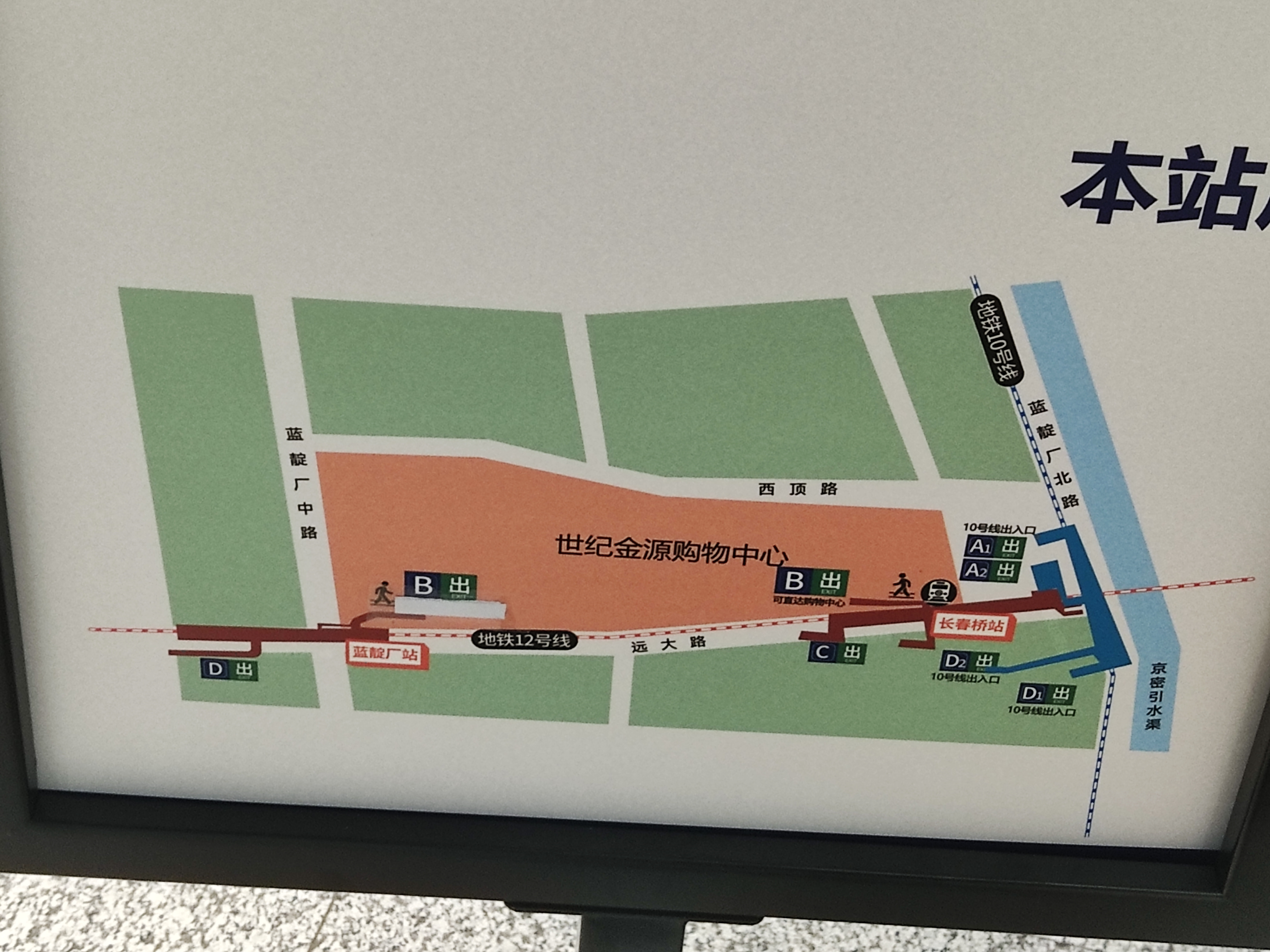
Notice about the connection to Golden Resources Shopping Mall at Changchun Qiao Station, Line 12.

It is located a short distance from the Golden Resources Mall, one of the world's largest shopping malls. The station also serves the Yuanda residential area.

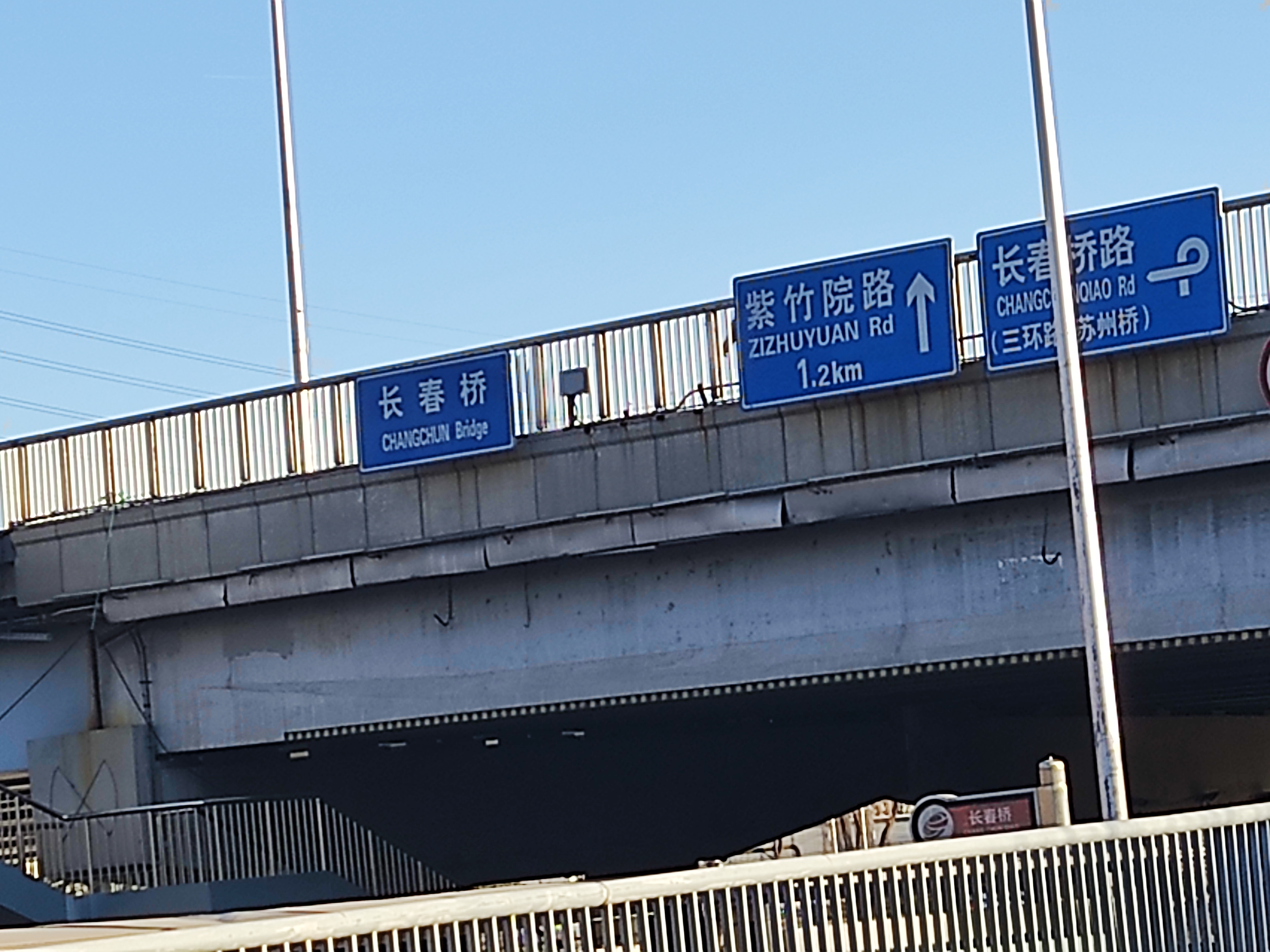
Changchun Bridge on Jingmi Diversion Canal near Changchun Qiao Subway Station.

The station is named after Changchun Bridge (simplified Chinese: 长春桥; traditional Chinese: 長春橋; pinyin: Chángchūn Qiáo), a bridge on Jingmi Diversion Canal.

== Exits ==
There are 6 exits, lettered A1, A2, B, C, D1, and D2. Exits A1, A2, C and D2 have accessible elevators.

== Gallery ==
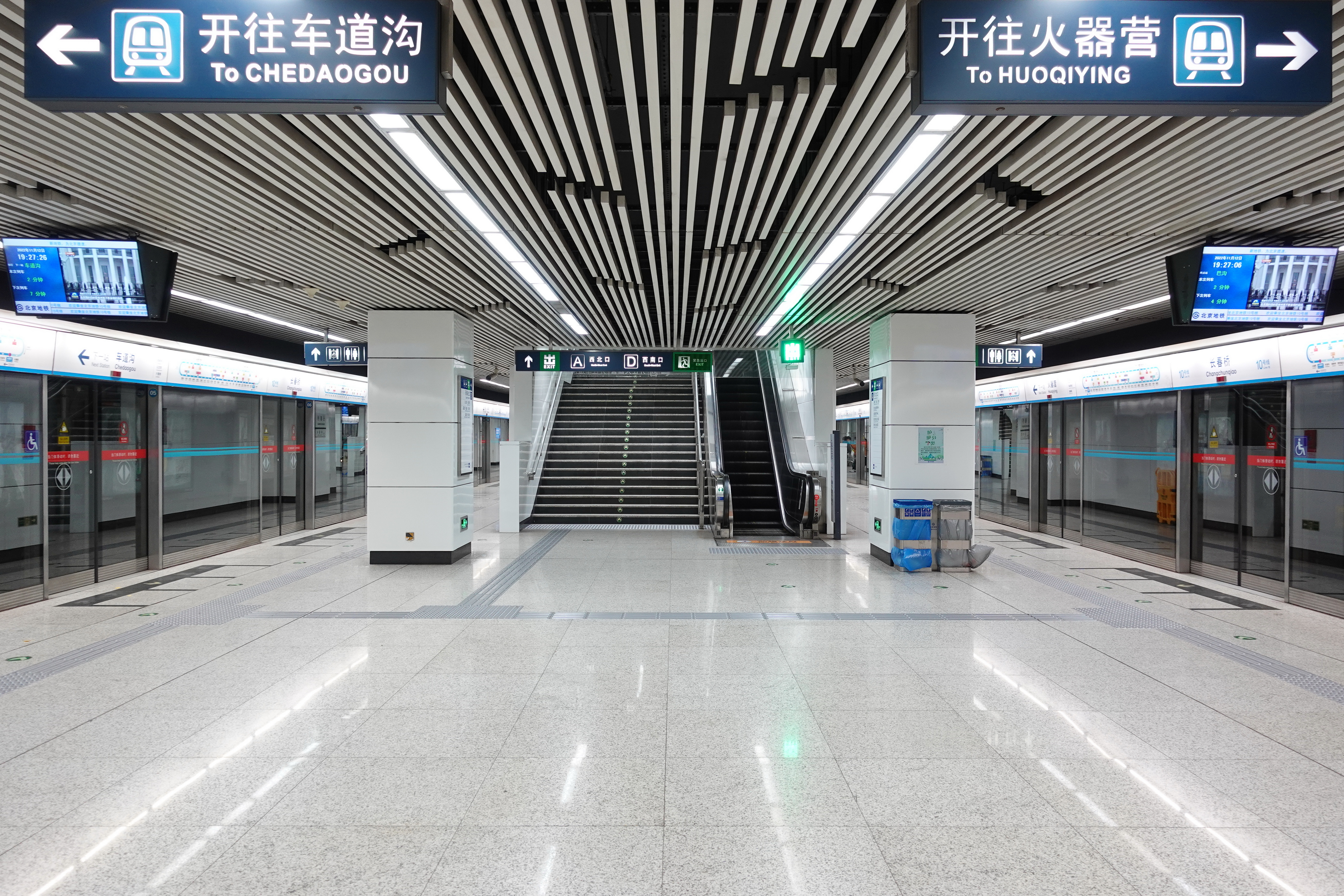
Platform (Line 10)

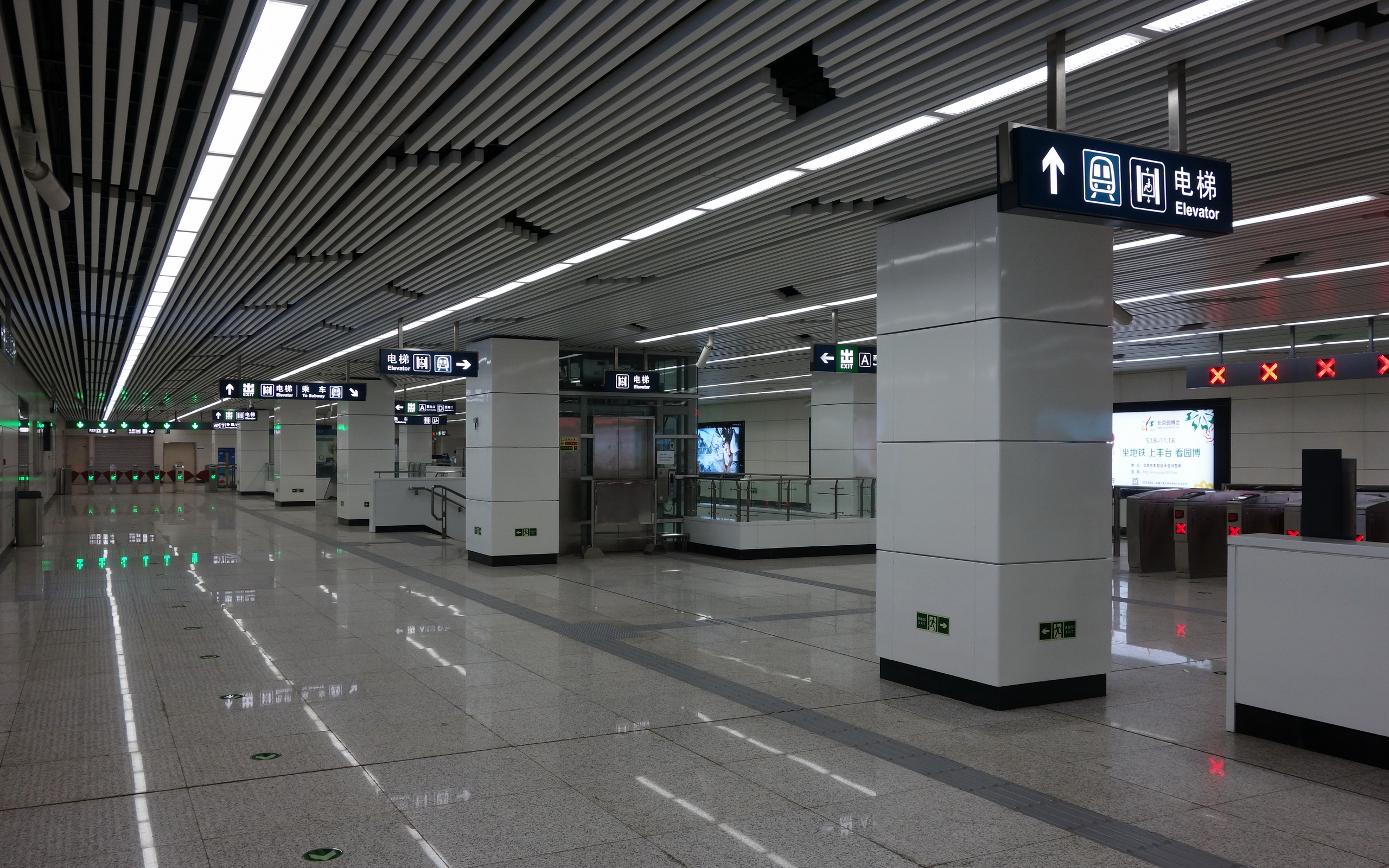
Concourse (Line 10, July 2013)

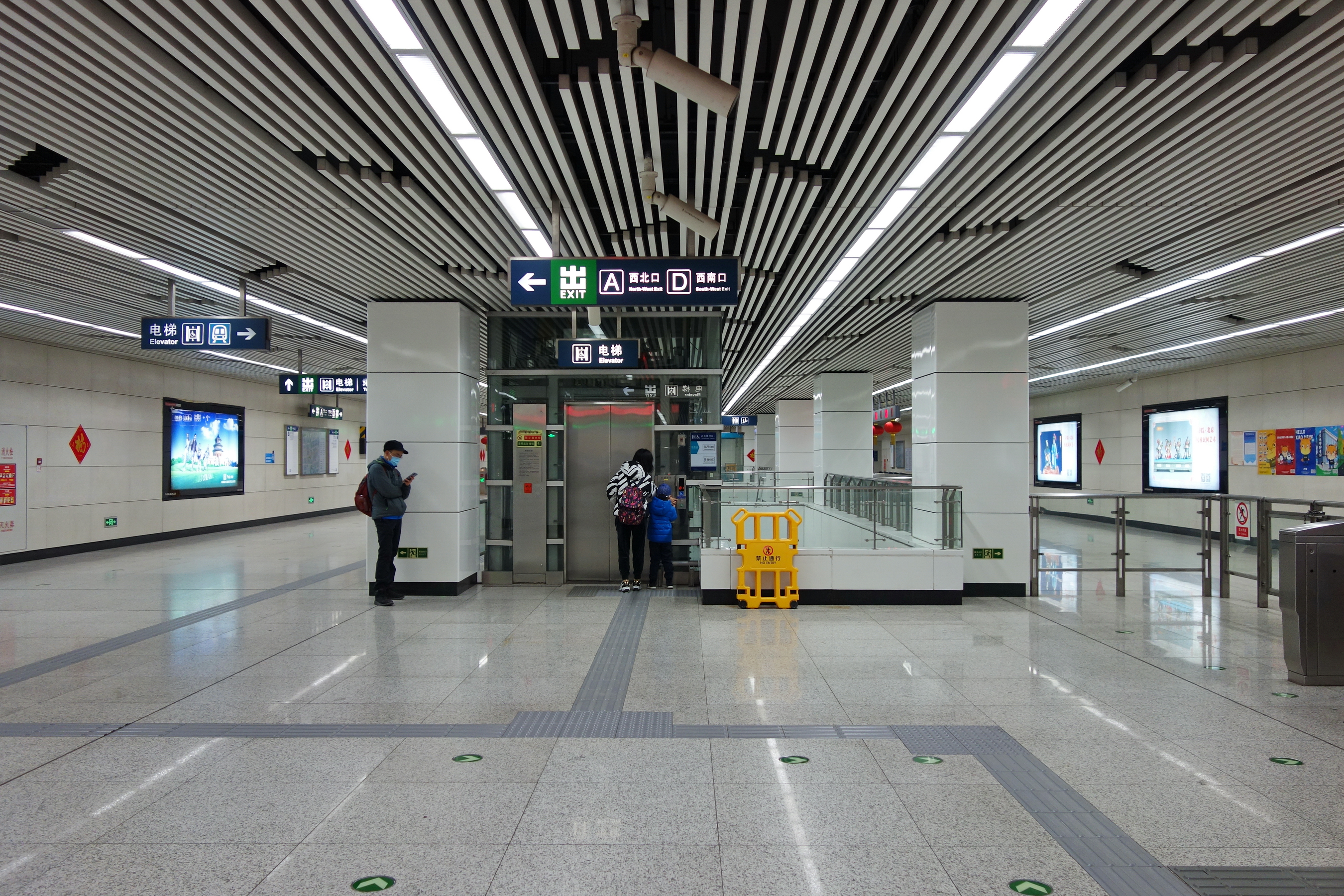
Concourse (Line 10, February 2021)

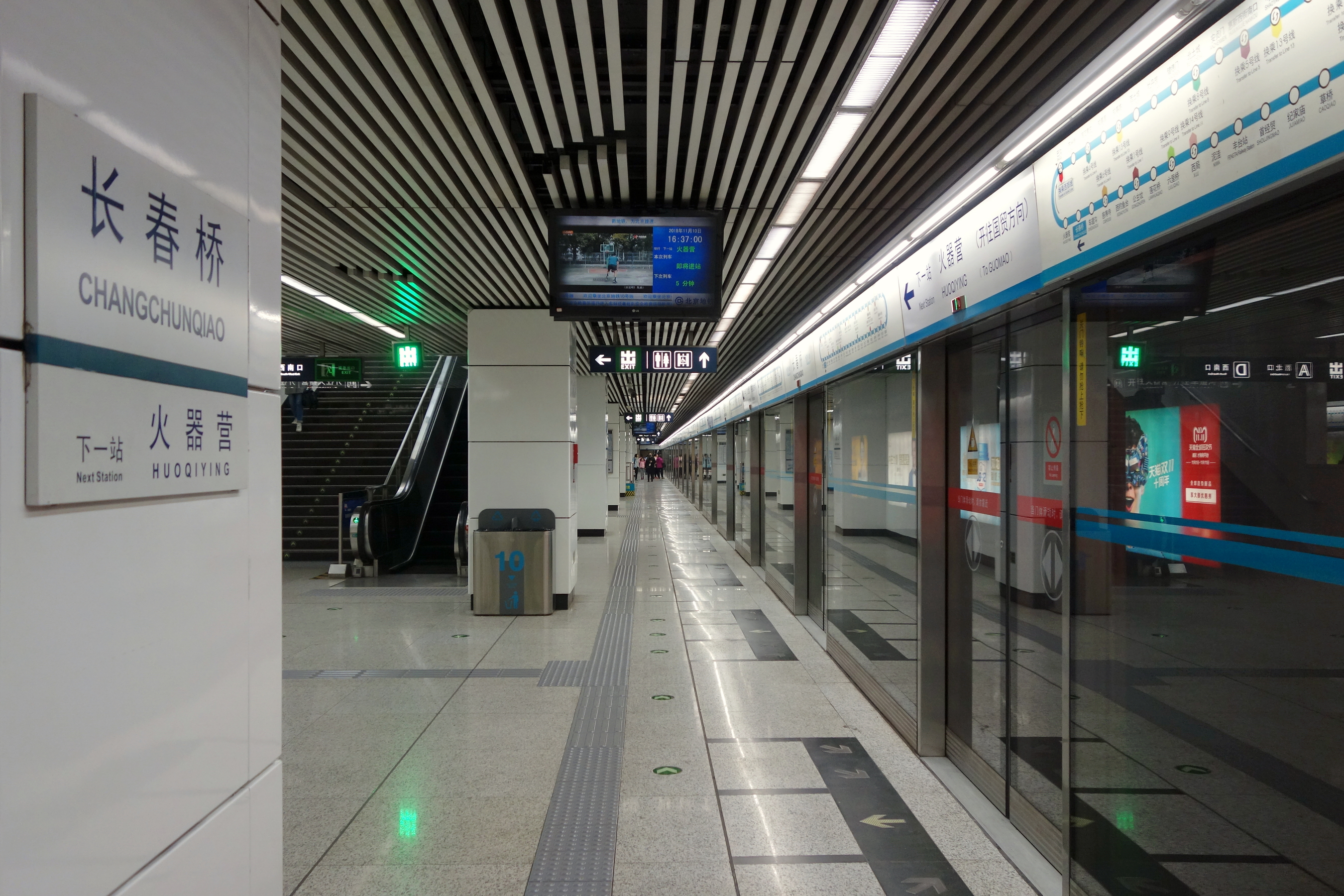
Platform (Line 10, November 2018)

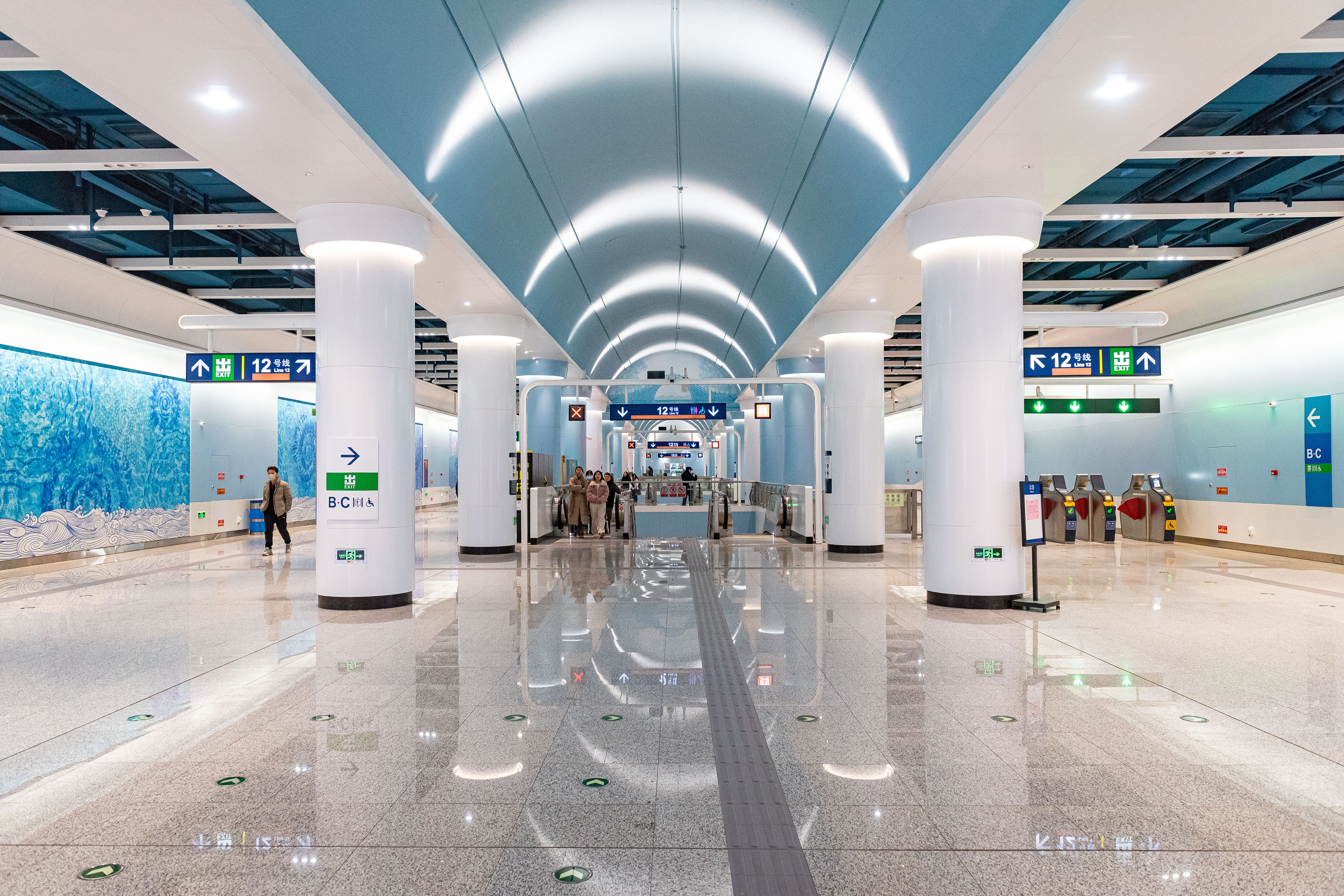
Concourse (Line 12, December 2024) (Picture 1)

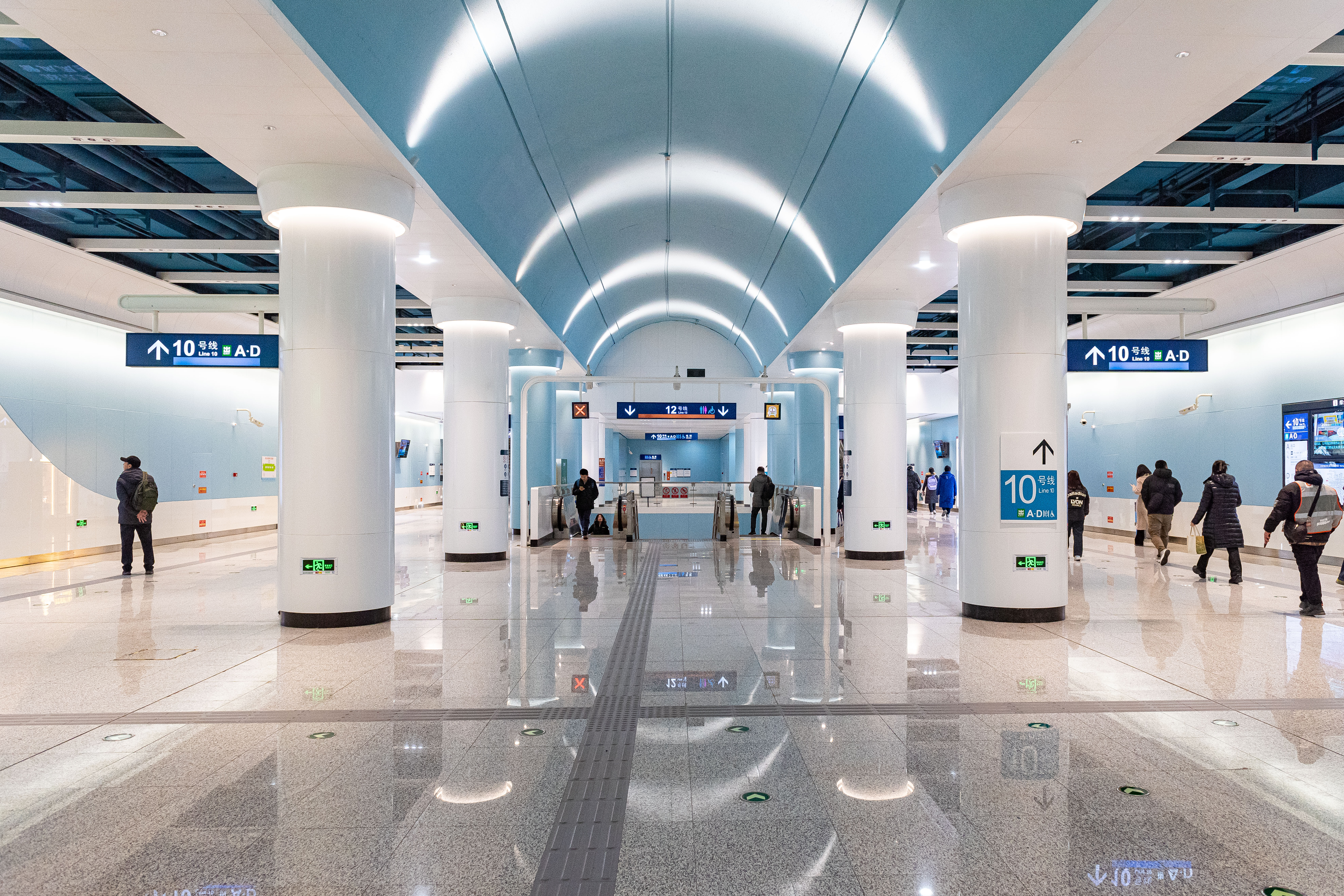
Concourse (Line 12, December 2024) (Picture 2)

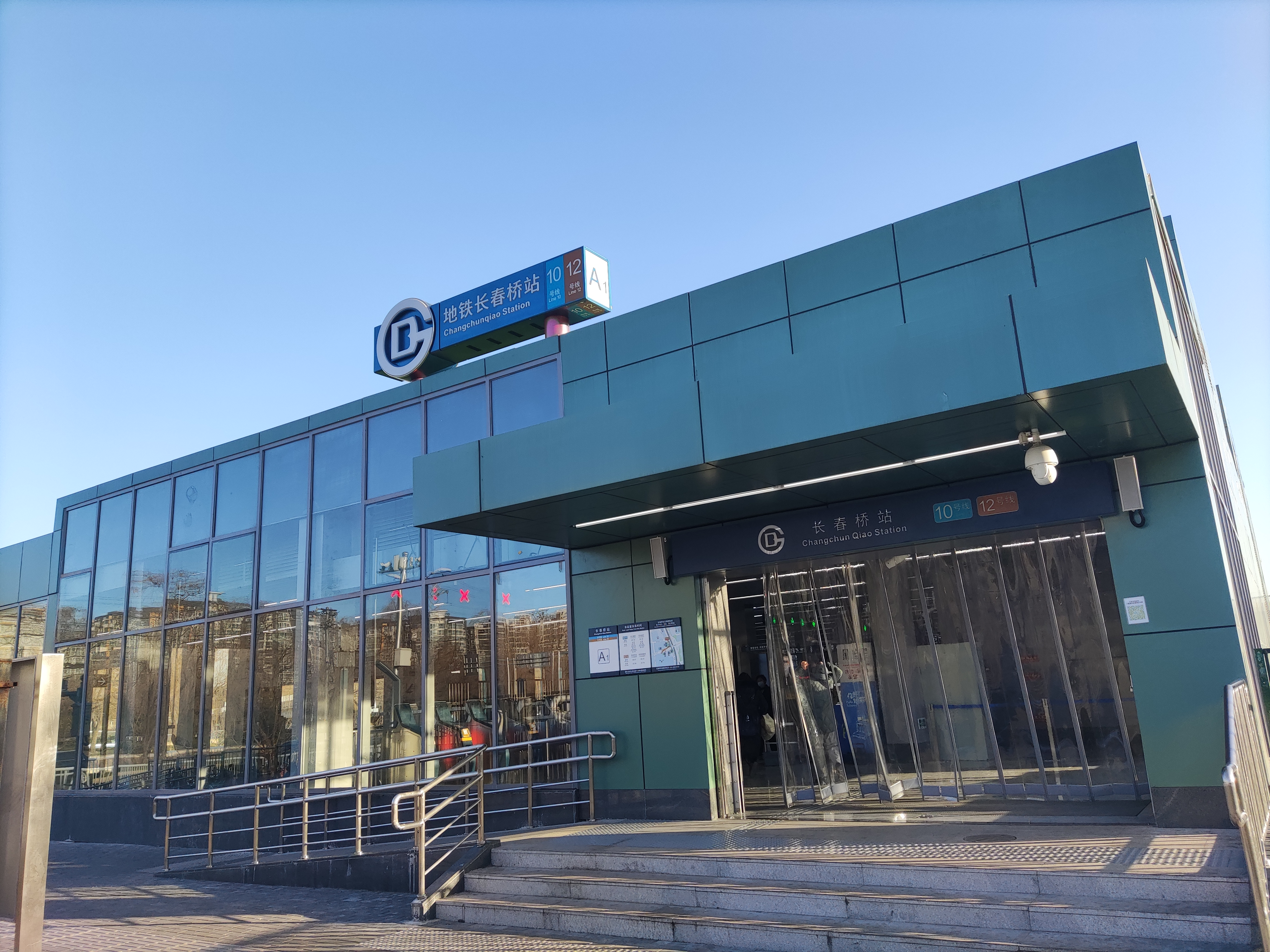
Exit A1, Line 10

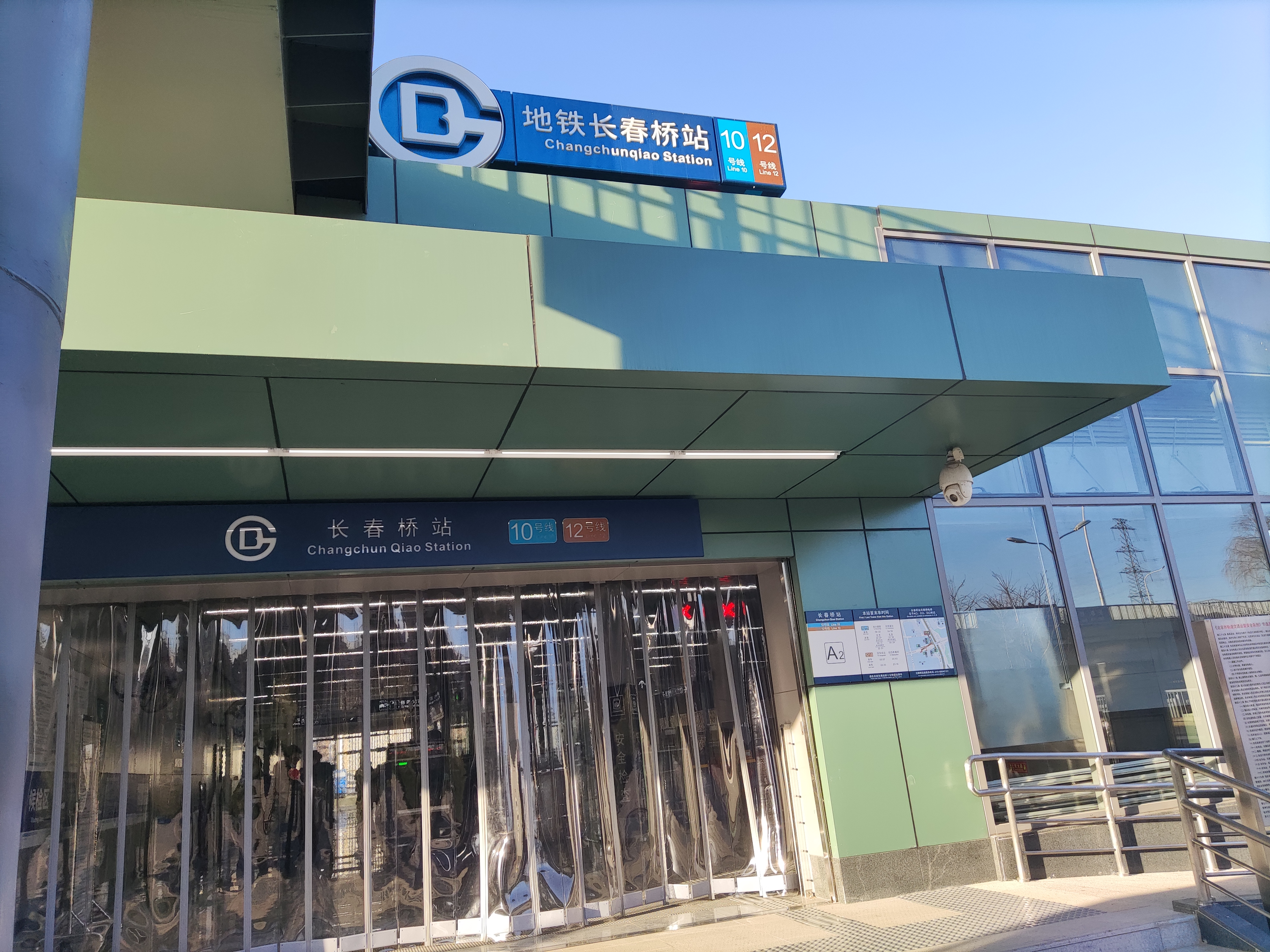
Exit A2, Line 10

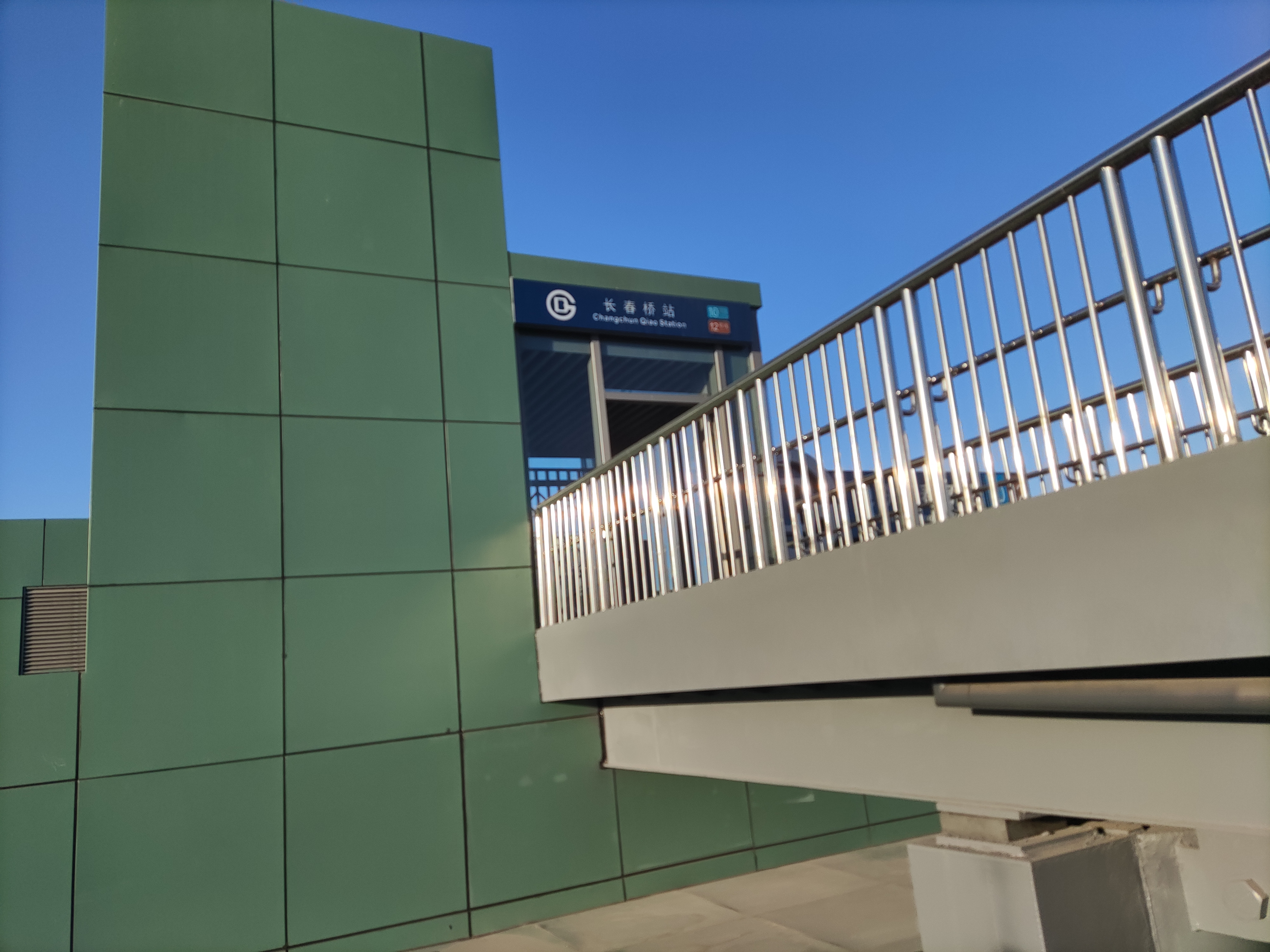
Elevator at Exit A2, Line 10

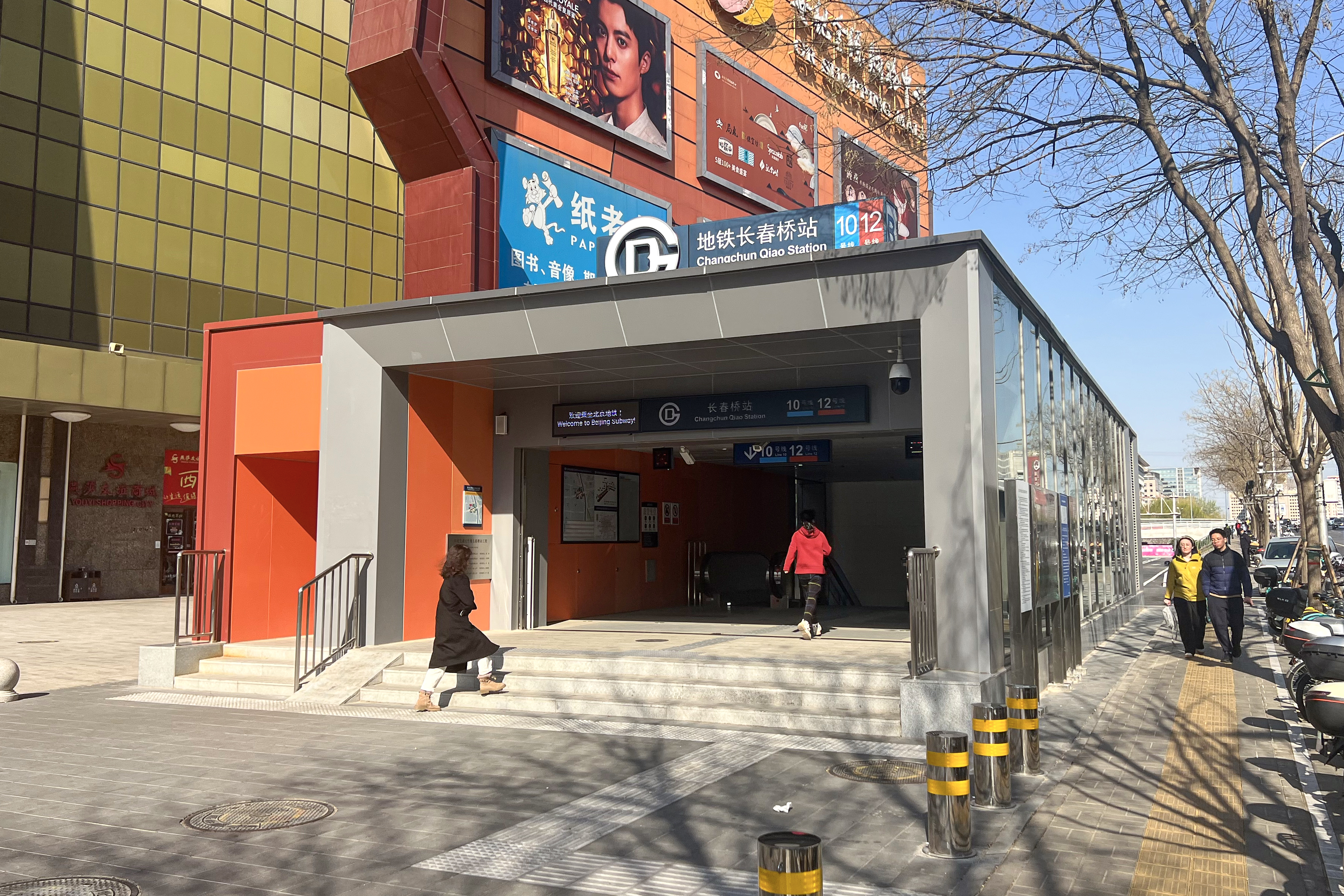
Exit B, Line 12

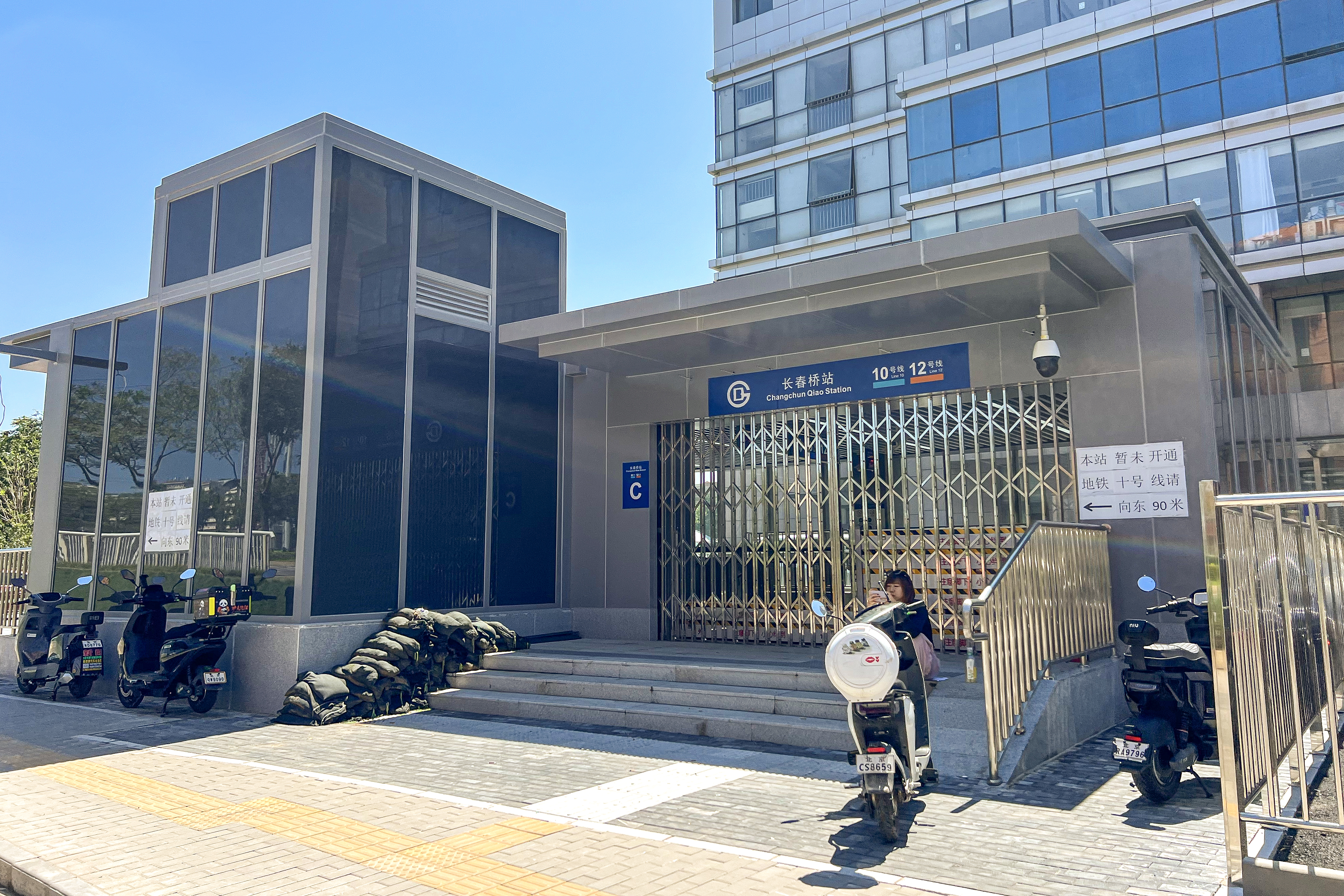
Exit C, Line 12

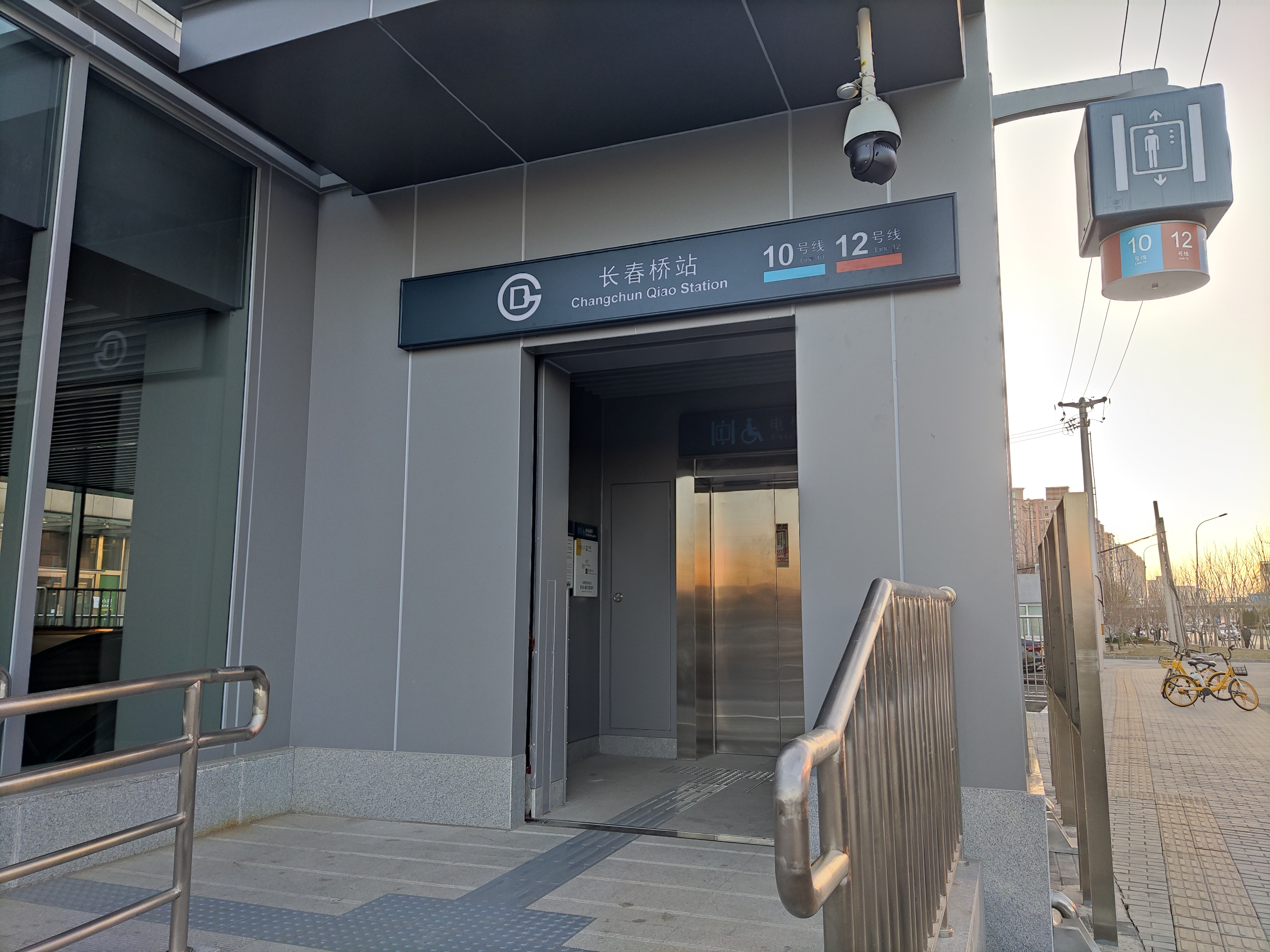
Elevator at Exit C, Line 12

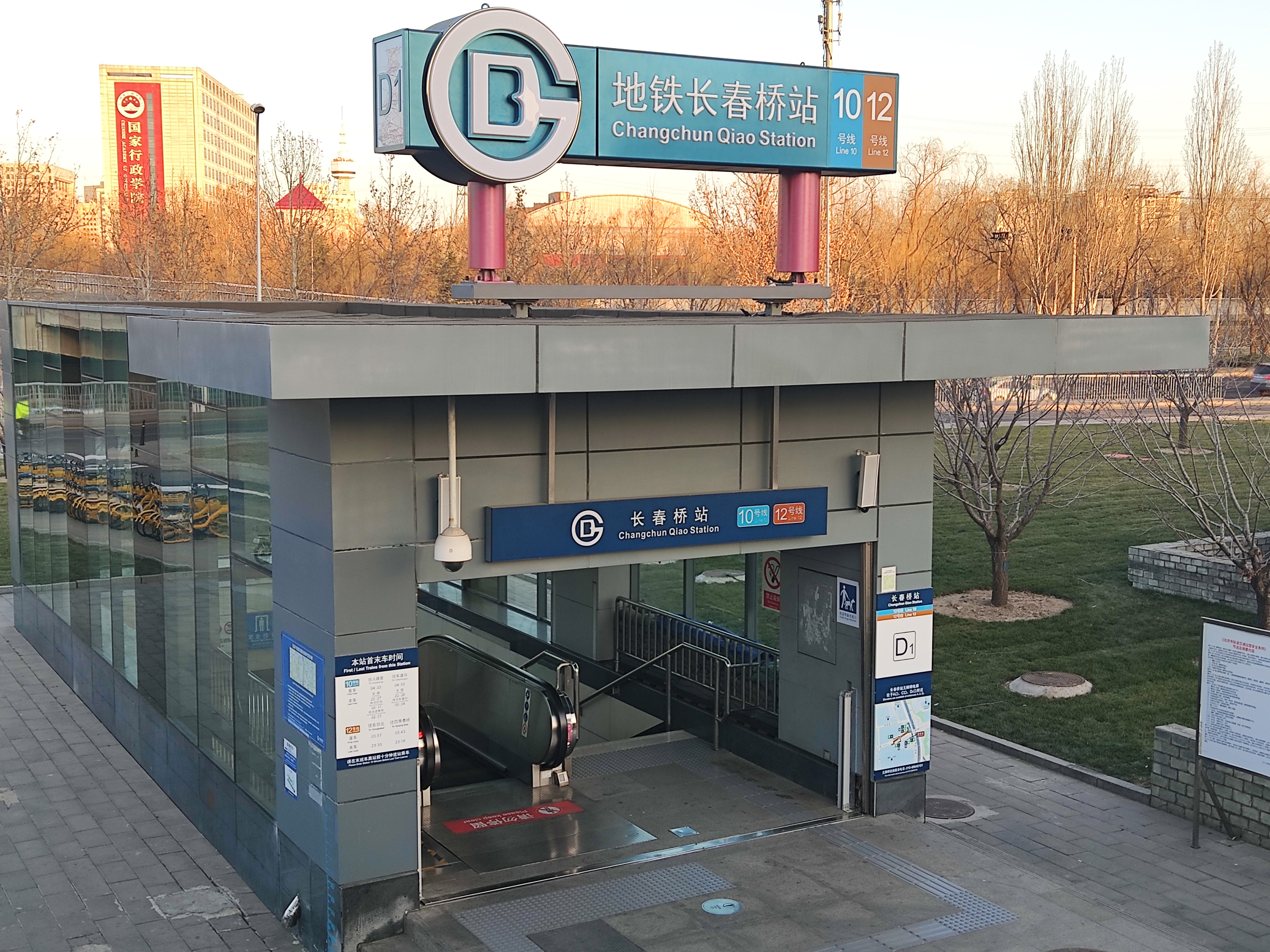
Exit D1, Line 10

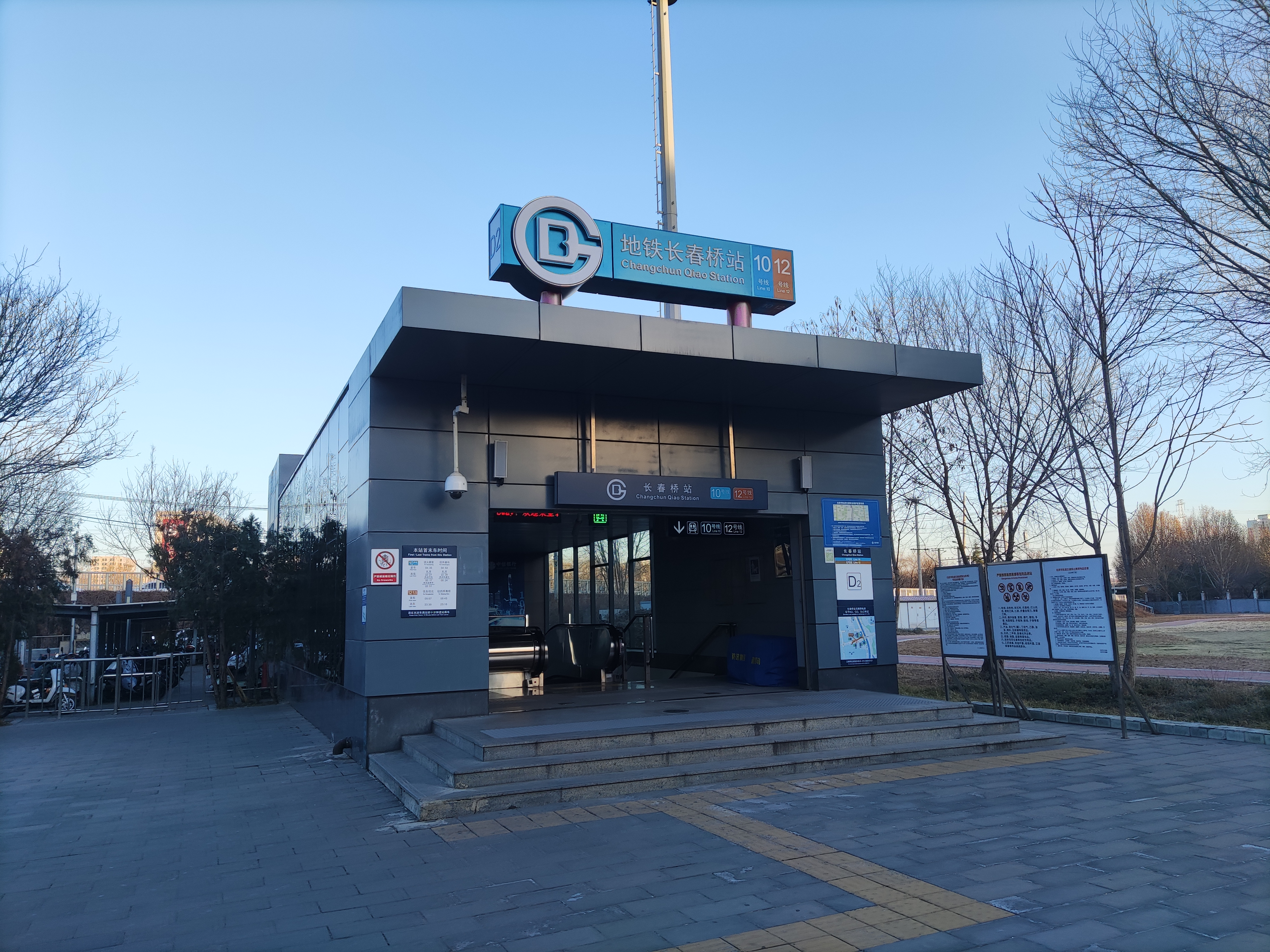
Exit D2, Line 10

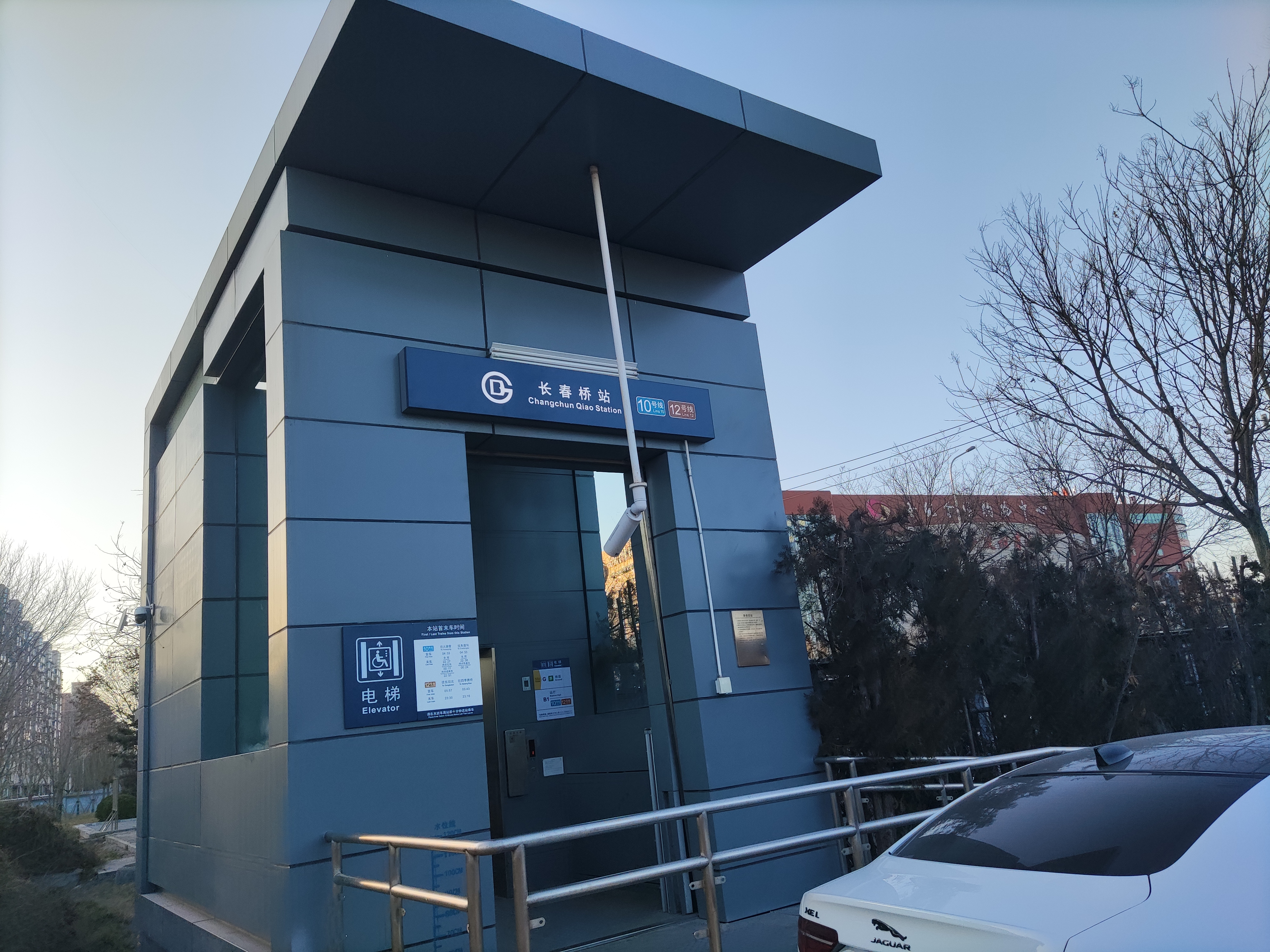
Elevator at Exit D2, Line 10
