= Shuguang Subdistrict, Beijing =

Shuguang Subdistrict 曙光街道
- Subdistrict
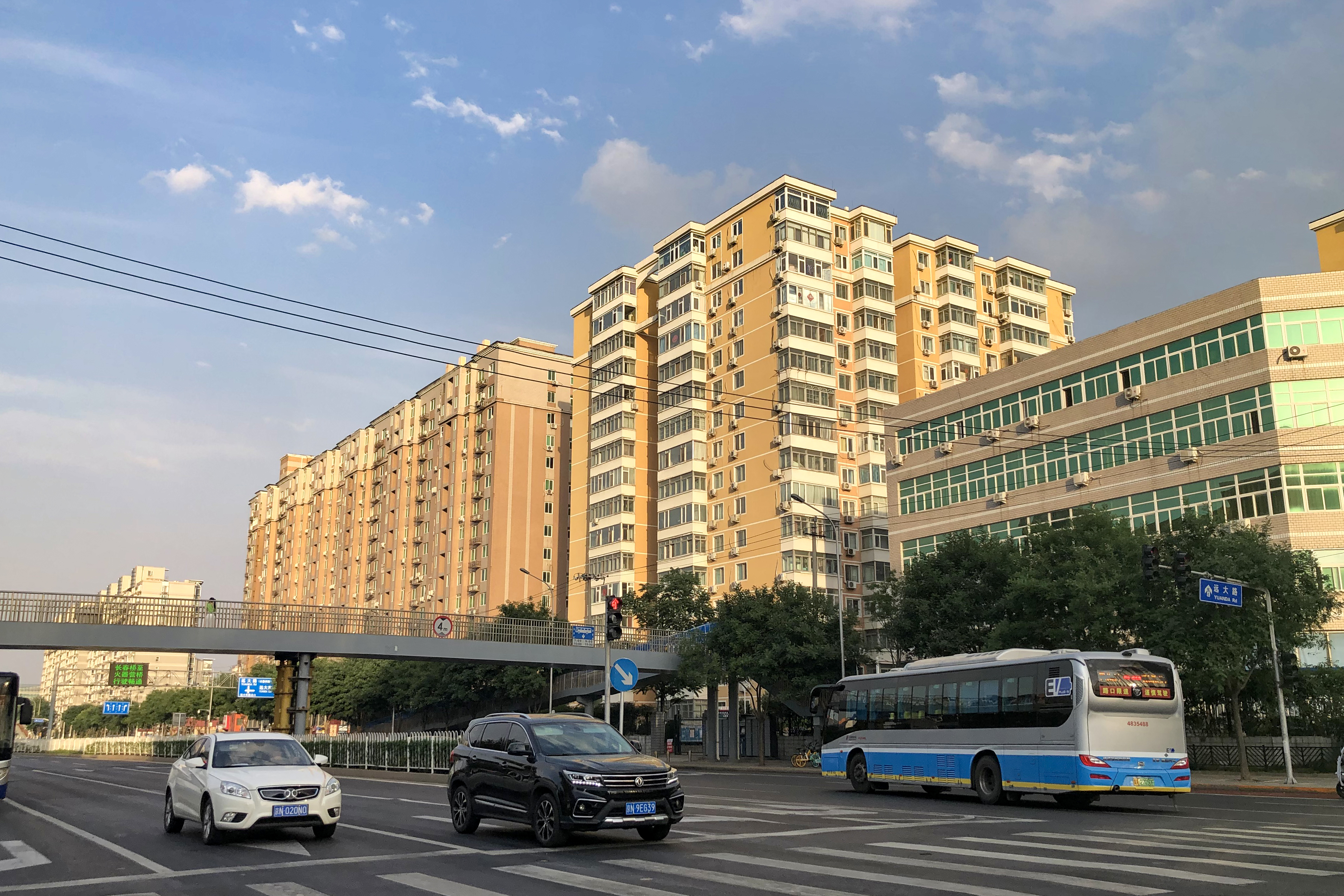
- Century City within the subdistrict, 2020

- Location within Beijing Location within China
- Coordinates: 39°57′52″N 116°16′24″E
- Country: China
- Municipality: Beijing
- District: Haidian
- Village-level Divisions: 17 communities

Area
  - Total: 5.49 km^{2} (2.12 sq mi)

Population (2020)
  - Total: 86,181
  - Density: 15,700/km^{2} (40,700/sq mi)
- Time zone: UTC+8 (China Standard)
- Postal code: 100097
- Area code: 010

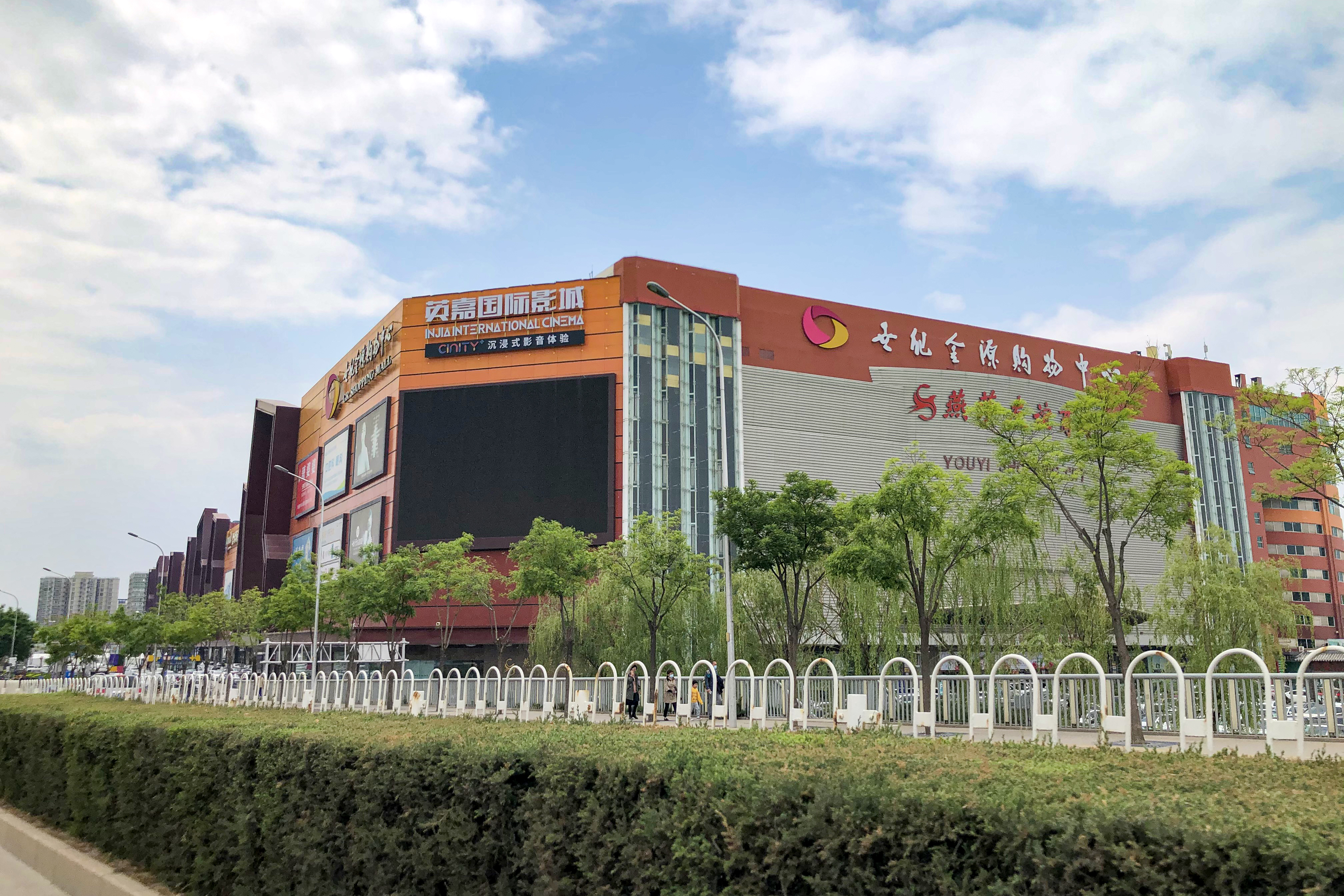
Golden Resources Mall within the subdistrict

Shuguang Subdistrict (Chinese: 曙光街道; pinyin: Shǔguāng Jiēdào) is a subdistrict situated at the center of Haidian District, Beijing, China. It is bordering Wangliu Area in its north, Haidian and Zizhuyuan Subdistricts in its east, Balizhuang Subdistrict in its south, Tiancunlu Subdistrict and Sijiqing Town in its west. In the year 2020, it had a population of 86,181.

The subdistrict was established in 2004. Its name Shuguang (Chinese: 曙光; lit. 'Light of Dawn') was from an anonymous poem.

== Administrative Divisions ==
Shuguang Subdistrict was divided into 17 communities as of 2021:

Administrative division code	Subdivision names	Name transliteration
110108025001	曙光花园	Shuguang Huayuan
110108025002	世纪城东区	Shijicheng Dongqu
110108025003	世纪城西区	Shijicheng Xiqu
110108025004	农科院	Nongkeyuan
110108025005	武警总部蓝靛厂小区	Wujing Zongbu Landianchang Xiaoqu
110108025008	火器营第三	Huoqiying Disan
110108025014	上河村	Shanghecun
110108025015	空军指挥学院	Kongjun Zhihui Xueyuan
110108025016	怡丽北园	Yili Beiyuan
110108025017	诚品建筑	Chengping Jianzhu
110108025020	世纪城晴雪园	Shijicheng Qingxueyuan
110108025021	世纪城时雨园	Shijicheng Shiyuyuan
110108025022	烟树园	Yanshuyuan
110108025023	望塔园	Wangtayuan
110108025024	远大园	Yuandayuan
110108025025	晨月园	Chenyueyuan
110108025026	金雅园	Jinyayuan

== See also ==
- List of township-level divisions of Beijing
