= Tuofangying station =

Beijing Subway Line 12 station

Tuofangying 驼房营
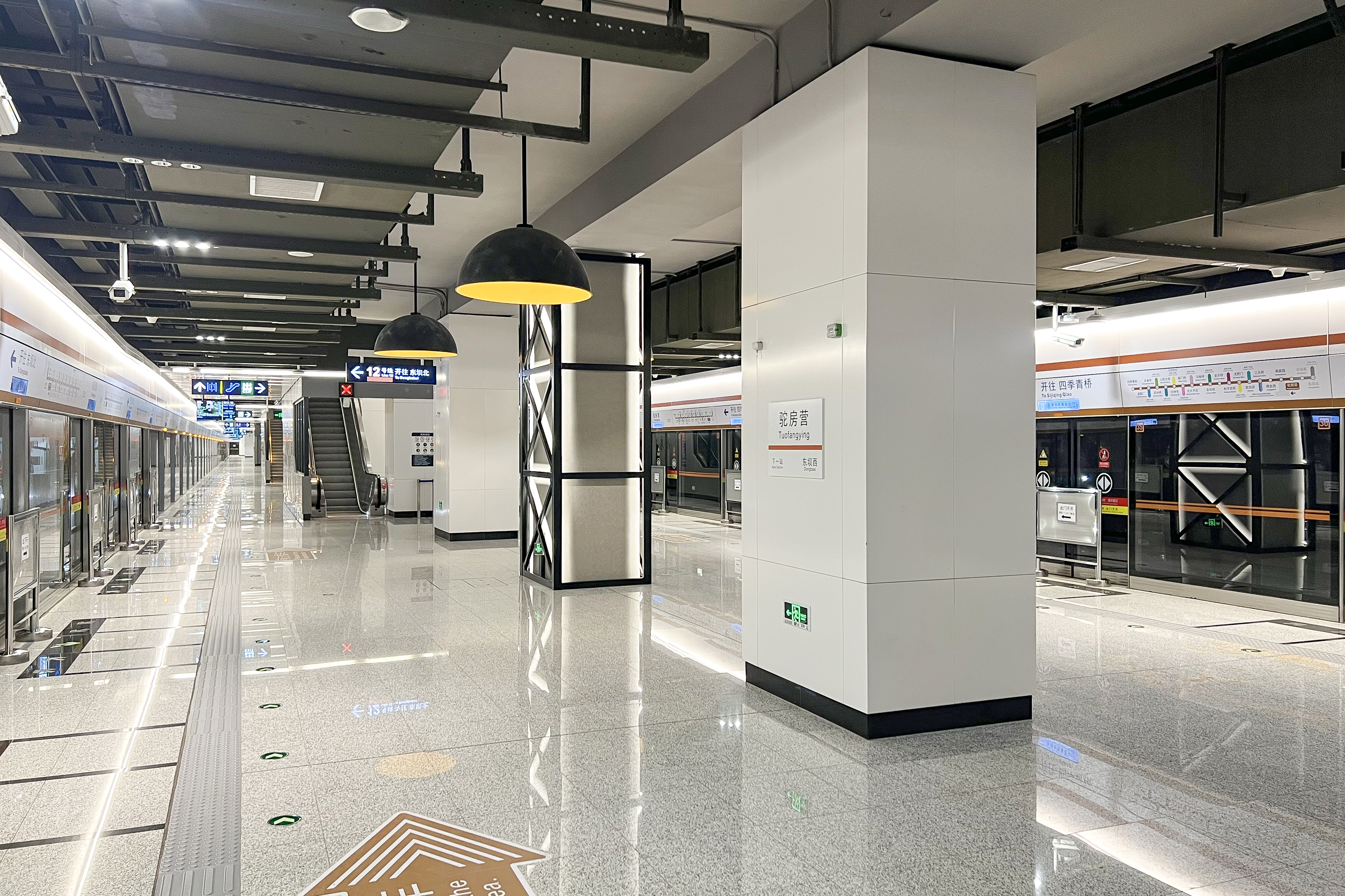
- Platform

Chinese name
- Simplified Chinese: 驼房营站
- Traditional Chinese: 駝房營站
Transcriptions
Standard Mandarin
- Hanyu Pinyin: Tuófángyíng zhàn

General information
- Location: East side of the intersection of Wanhong Road (万红路) and Tuofangying Road (驼房营路), Jiuxianqiao Subdistrict; Chaoyang District, Beijing; China
- Coordinates: 39°58′45″N 116°29′58″E
- Operator: Beijing Mass Transit Railway Operation Corporation Limited
- Line: Line 12
- Platforms: 2 (1 island platform)
- Tracks: 2

Construction
- Structure type: Underground
- Accessible: Yes

History
- Opened: December 15, 2024; 20 months ago
- Former names: Jiuxianqiao (酒仙桥)

Services
Preceding station	Beijing Subway	Following station
Gaojiayuan towards Sijiqing Qiao	Line 12	Dongbaxi towards Dongbabei
Location
- Location within Beijing

Tuofangying station (simplified Chinese: 驼房营站; traditional Chinese: 駝房營站; pinyin: Tuófángyíng zhàn) is a station on Line 12 of the Beijing Subway. It opened on December 15, 2024.

== Location ==
The station is located underground east of the intersection of Wanhong Road and Tuofangying Road in Jiuxianqiao Subdistrict in Chaoyang District.

== Station features ==
The station has an underground island platform. Due to its proximity to the 798 Art Zone, the station is decorated in an industrial style, and there are also ceramic art murals called "Memory", "Carrying", "Salute" and "Departure" created by Xing Xiaolin, Li Zheng and Geng Xiaobing in the concourse, showing the development history of the 798 and 751 factories.

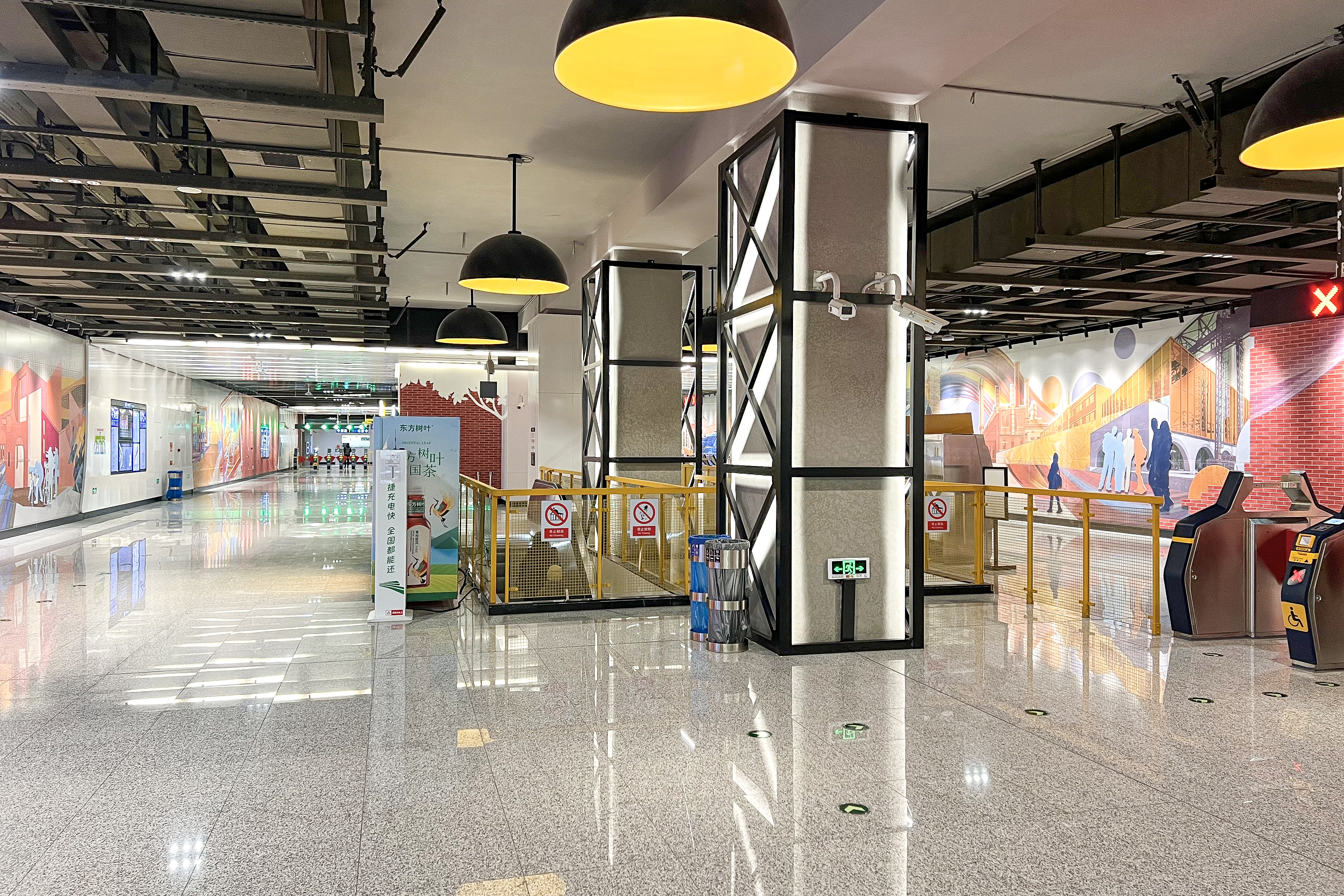
Concourse

== Exits ==
There are 4 exits, lettered A, B, C and D. Exits A and C have accessible elevators.

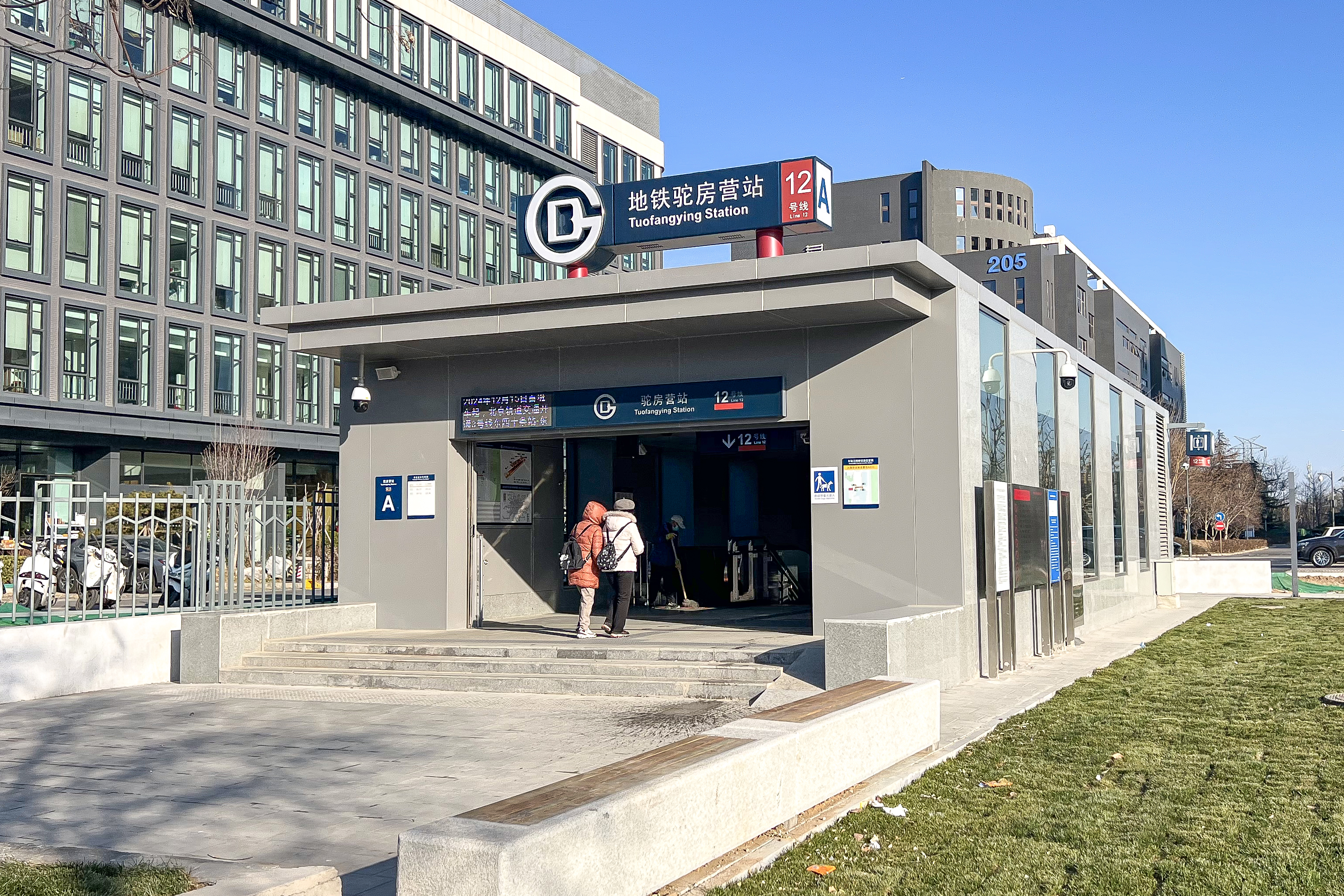
Exit A

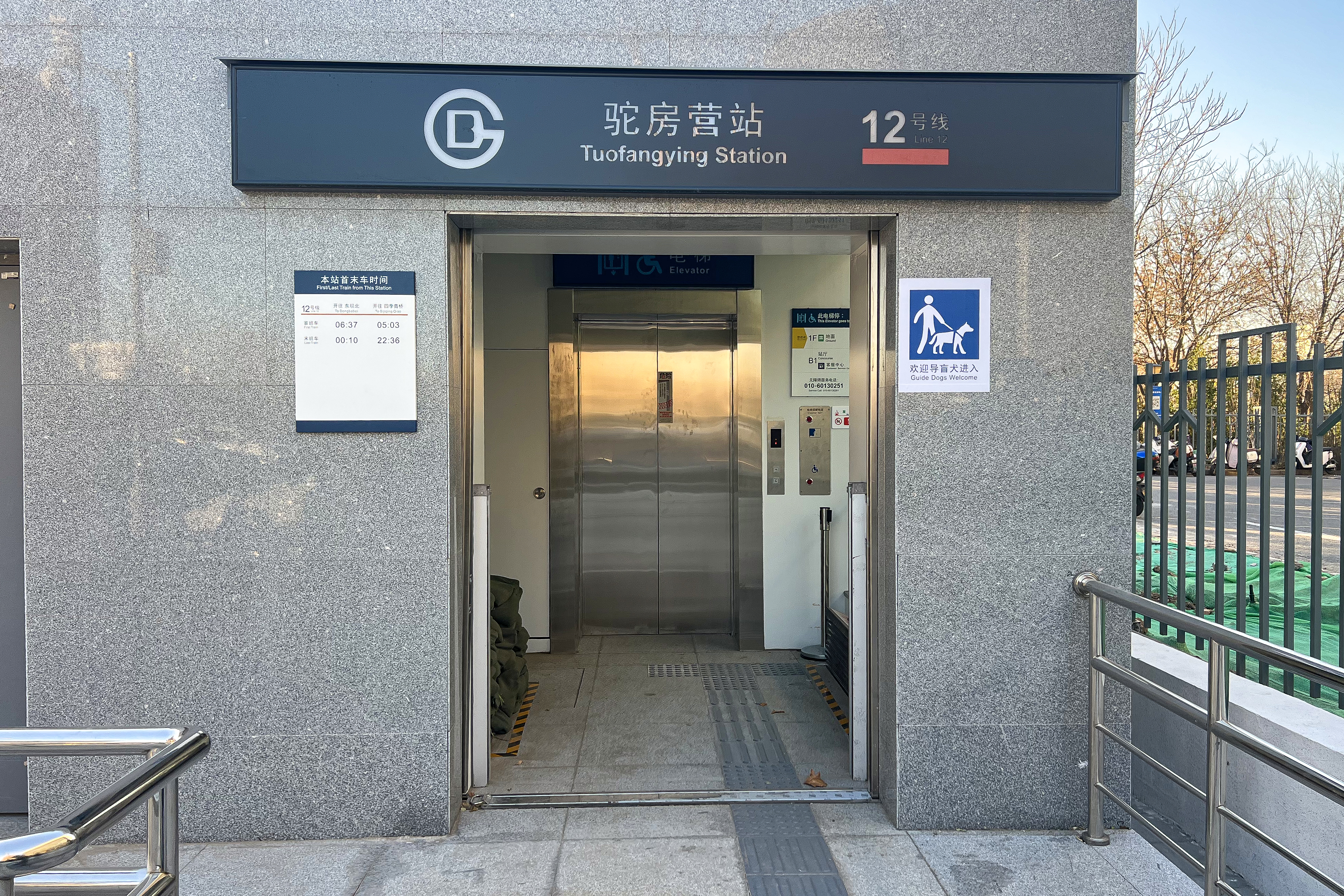
Exit A accessible exit

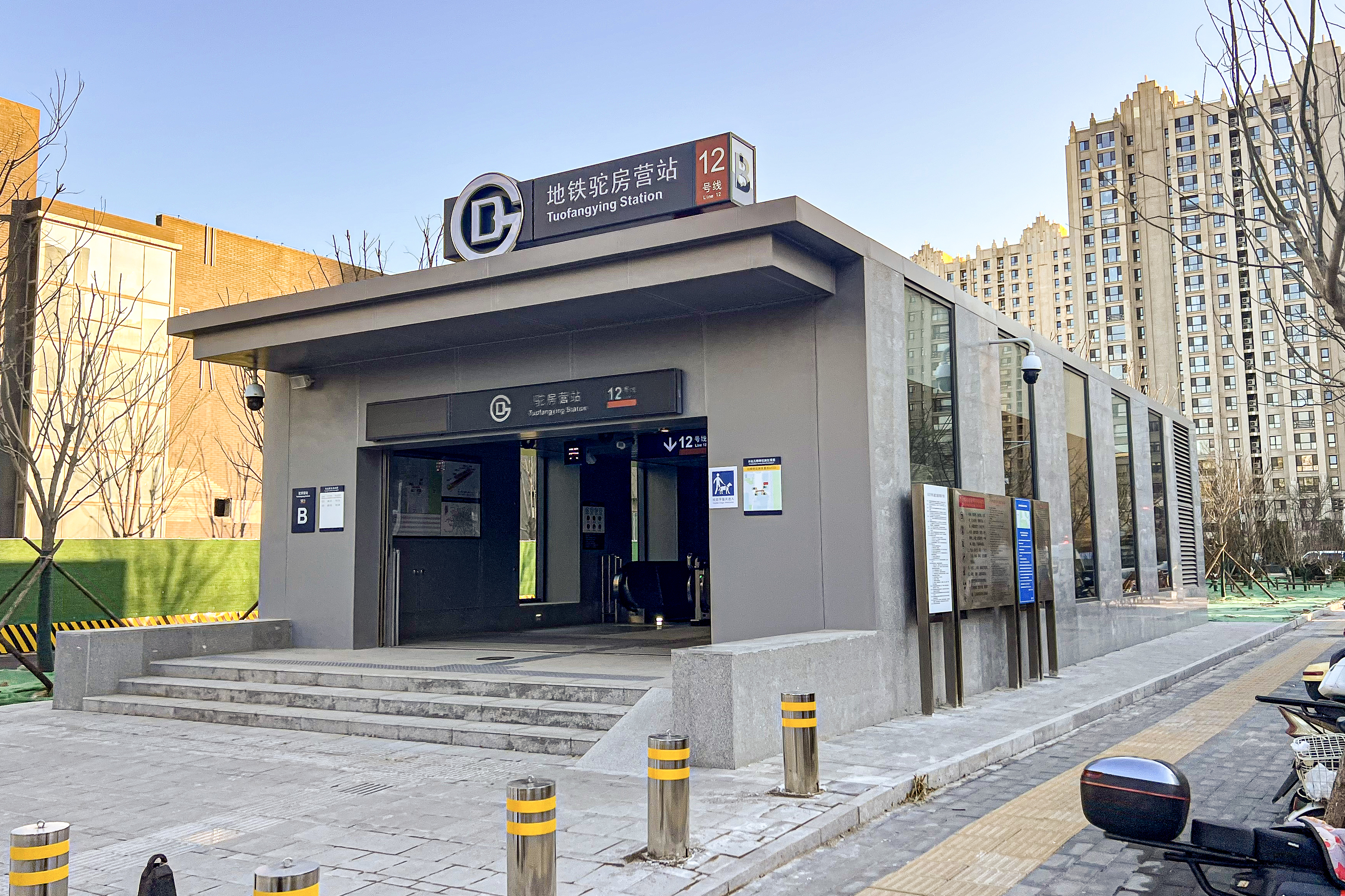
Exit B

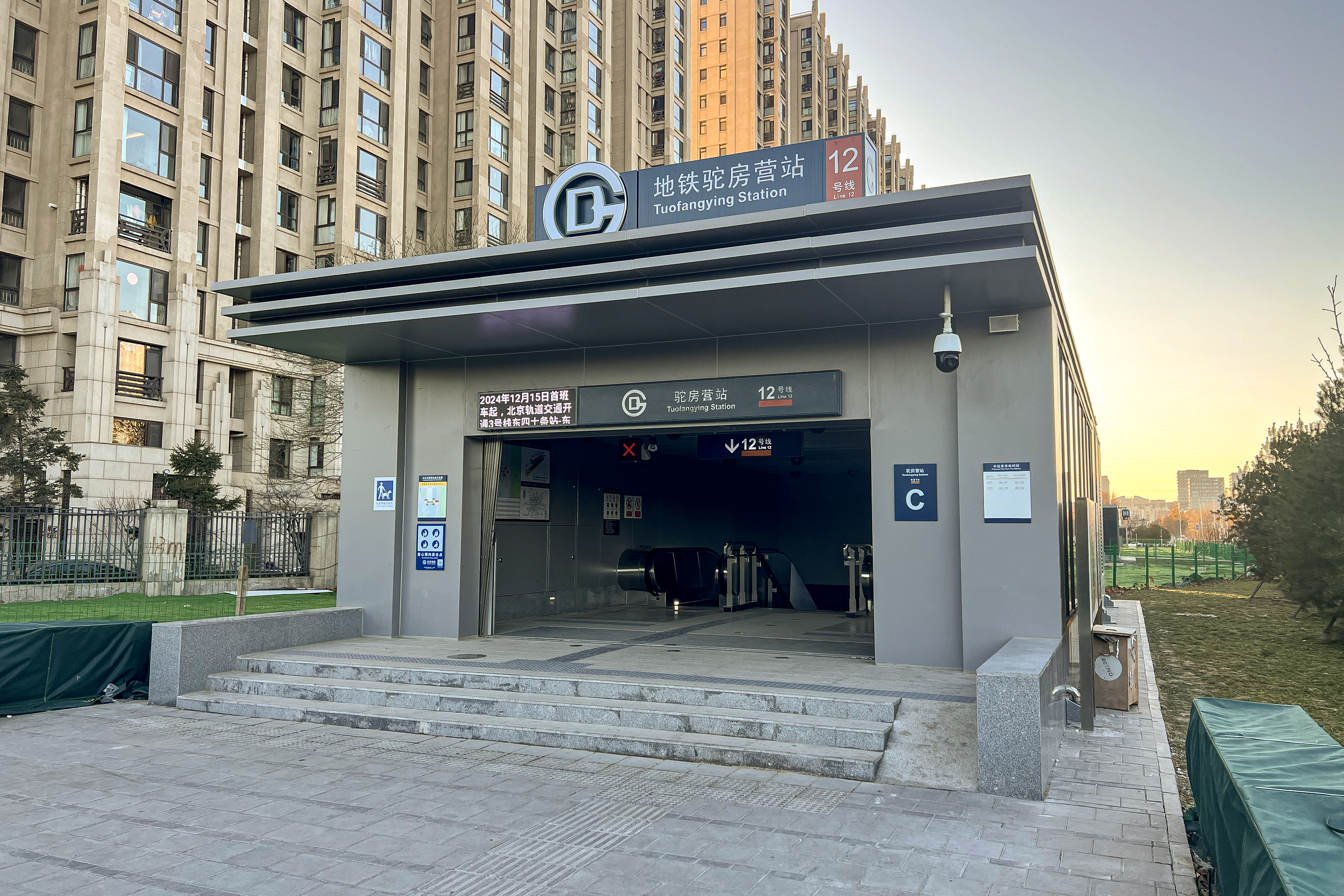
Exit C

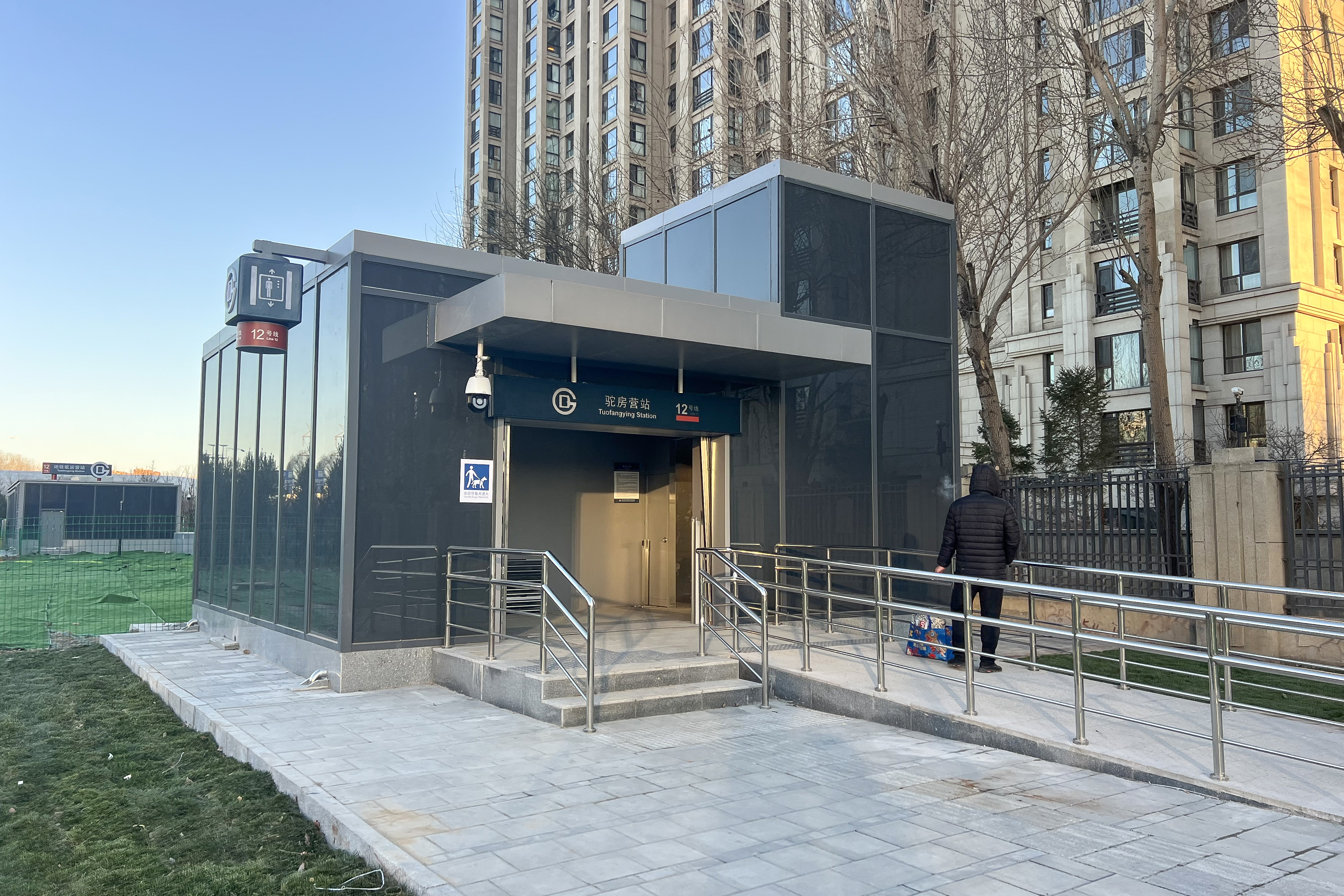
Exit C accessible exit

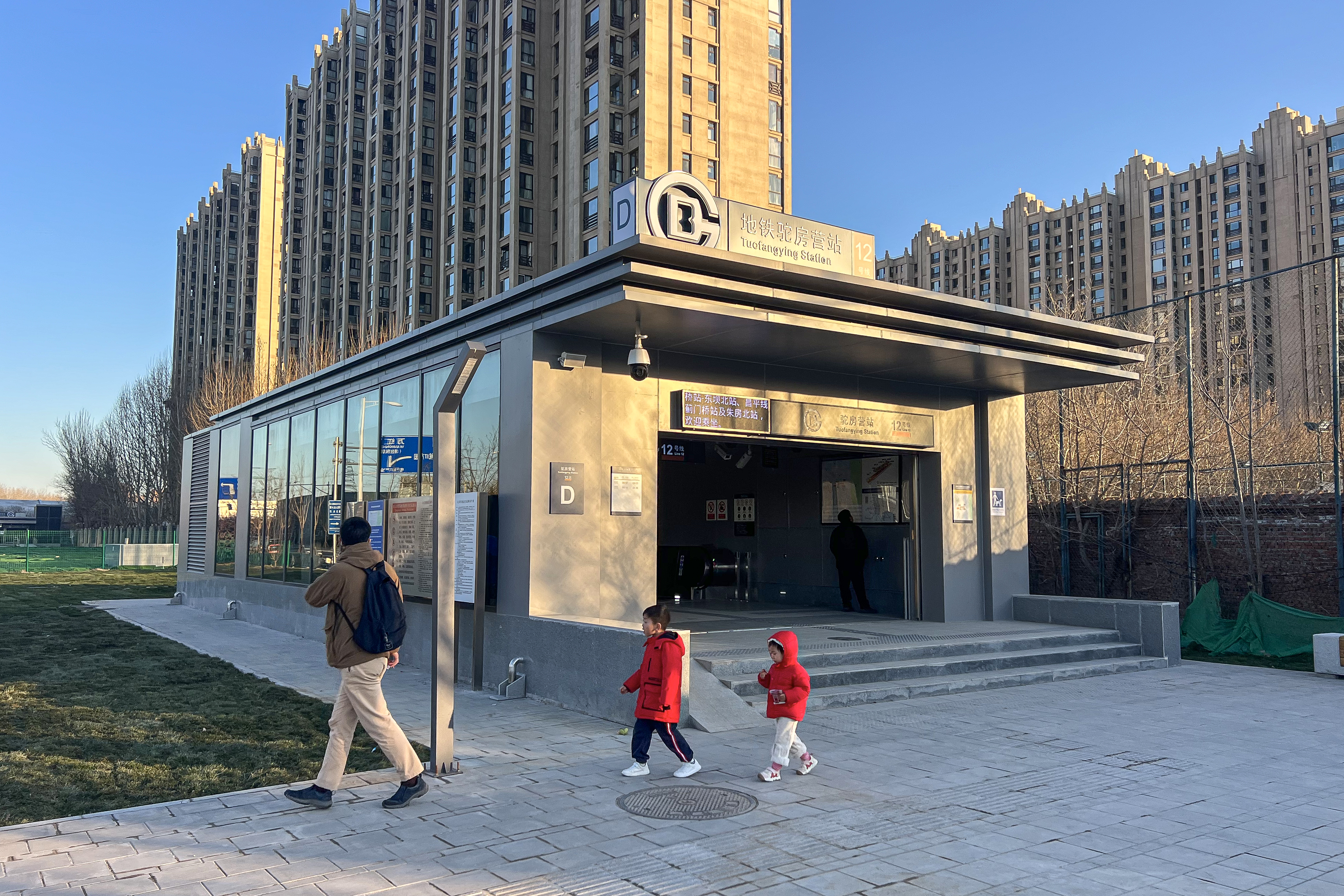
Exit D

== History ==
The station was previously named as Jiuxianqiao (Chinese: 酒仙桥; pinyin: Jiǔxiānqiáo), which was later changed to Tuofangying in the Line 12 station name plan. It was officially renamed to Tuofangying on January 3, 2024.

== Near the station ==
- 798 Art Zone
