= Gaojiayuan station =

Beijing Subway Line 12 station

Gaojiayuan 高家园
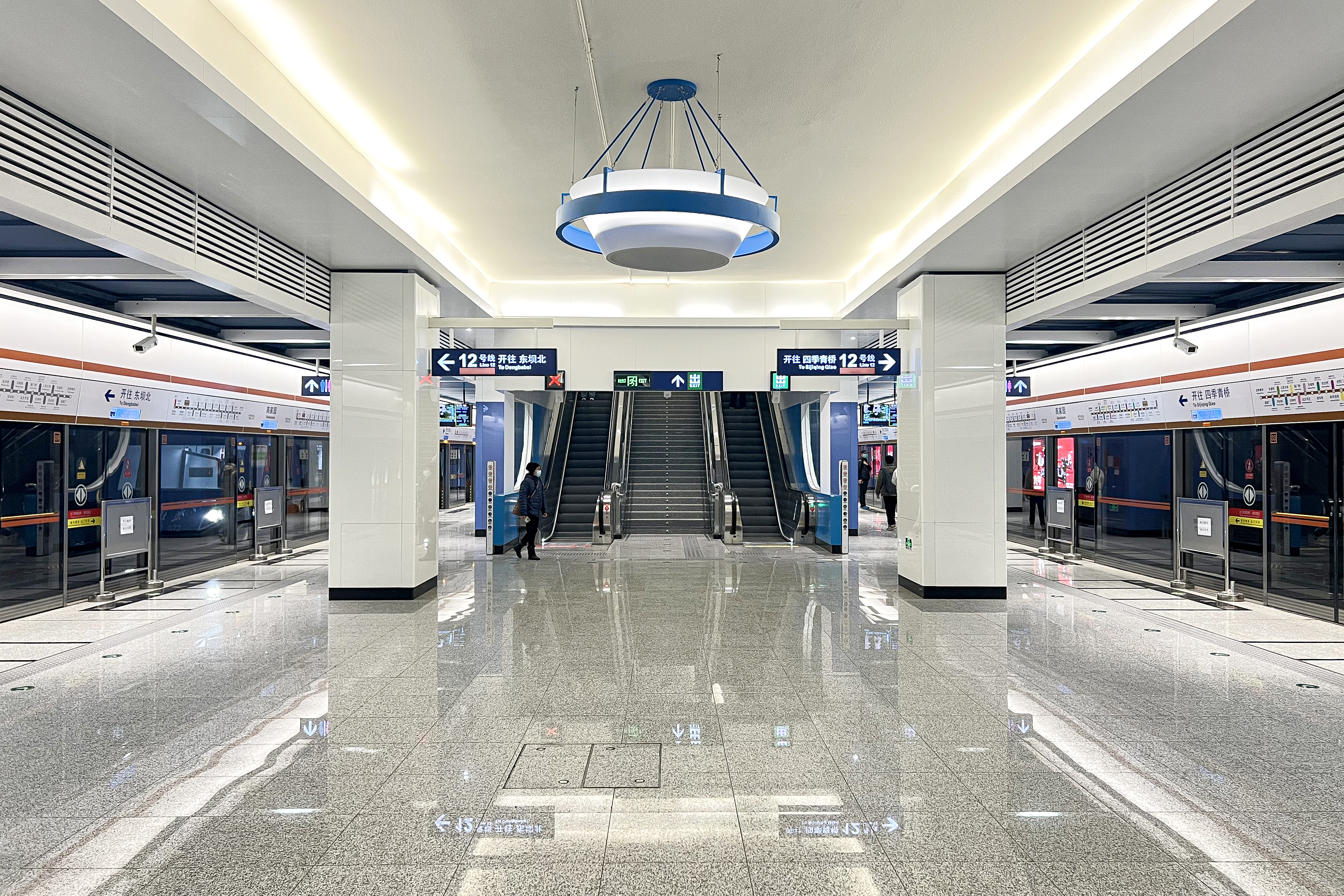
- Line 12 platform in December 2024

Chinese name
- Simplified Chinese: 高家园站
- Traditional Chinese: 高家園站
Transcriptions
Standard Mandarin
- Hanyu Pinyin: Gāojiāyuán zhàn

General information
- Location: Intersection of Jiuxianqiao Rd (酒仙桥路) and Wanhong Rd (万红路), Jiuxianqiao Subdistrict, Chaoyang District, Beijing; China
- Coordinates: 39.979253°N 116.482741°E
- Operator: Beijing Mass Transit Railway Operation Corporation Limited
- Lines: Line 12; Line 14 (Shelved)
- Platforms: 4 (1 island platform and 2 reserved side platforms)
- Tracks: 4

Construction
- Structure type: Underground
- Accessible: Yes

History
- Opened: Line 12: December 15, 2024; 20 months ago; Line 14: Shelved

Services
Preceding station	Beijing Subway	Following station
Jiangtaixi towards Sijiqing Qiao	Line 12	Tuofangying towards Dongbabei
Line 14 does not stop here
Location
- Location within Beijing

Gaojiayuan station (simplified Chinese: 高家园站; traditional Chinese: 高家園站; pinyin: Gāojiāyuán zhàn) is a station on Line 12 of the Beijing Subway. At the same time, it is a planned interchange station between Line 12 and Line 14. The Line 12 station opened on December 15, 2024. Due to the slow and uncertain progress of demolition and relocation of the occupied area for the station equipment buildings, as well as the unstable surrounding hydrogeological conditions, the opening plan for the Line 14 station has been shelved.

== Location ==
The station is located at the intersection of Jiuxianqiao Road and Wanhong Road in Jiuxianqiao Subdistrict of Chaoyang District. The platform for Line 12 is located at the east side of the crossing of Jiuxianqiao Road and Wanhong Road, and the platform for Line 14 will be located on Wanhong West Street.

== Exits ==
There are 3 exits for Line 12, lettered A, B, and C. Exits A and C have accessible elevators. Line 14 is currently in the stage of a reserved station (except for the transfer passageway built by Line 12, everything else is still in a state of suspension). The station of Line 14 plans to set up two exits on the northeast side of Wanhong West Street.

== Gallery ==
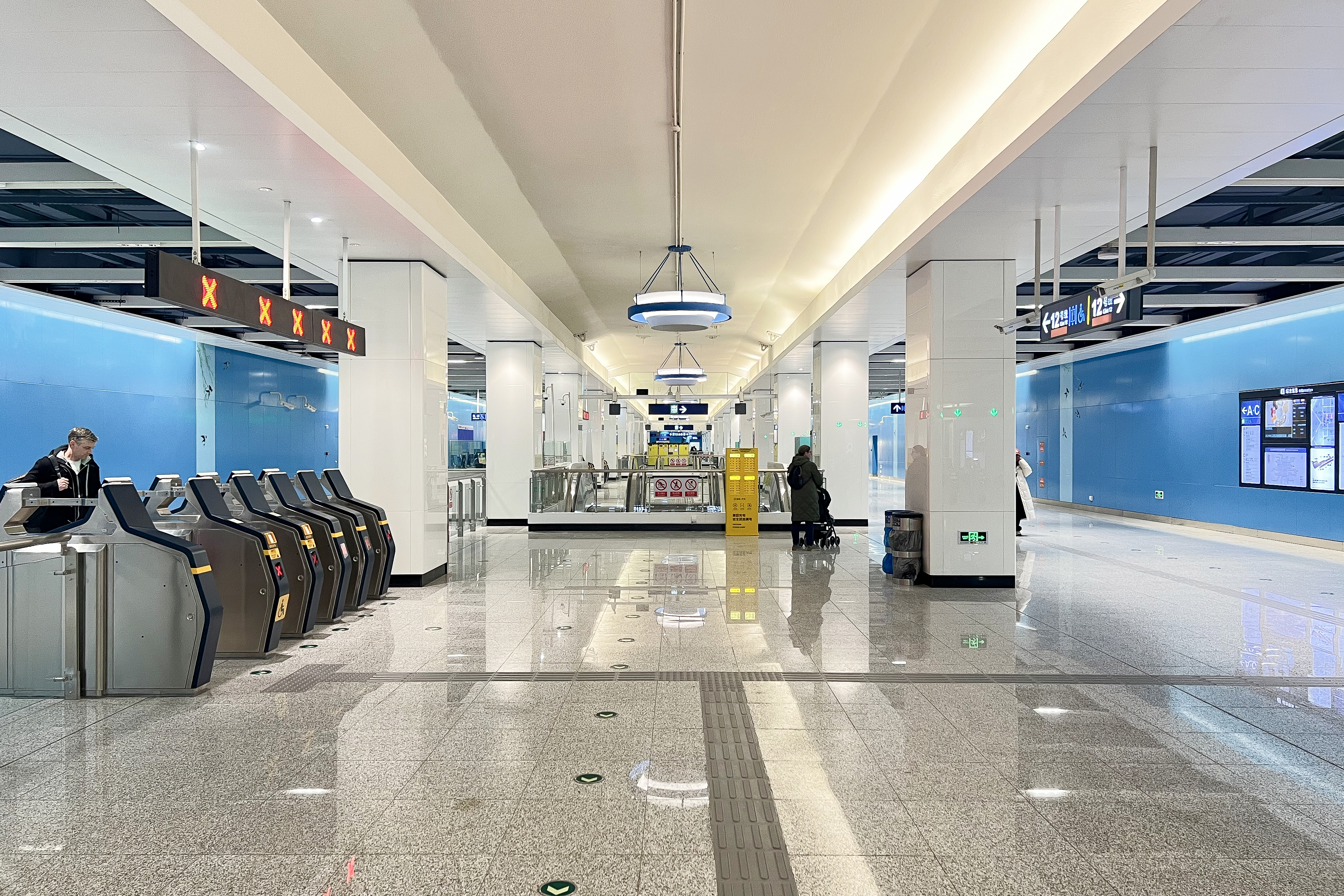
Line 12 concourse

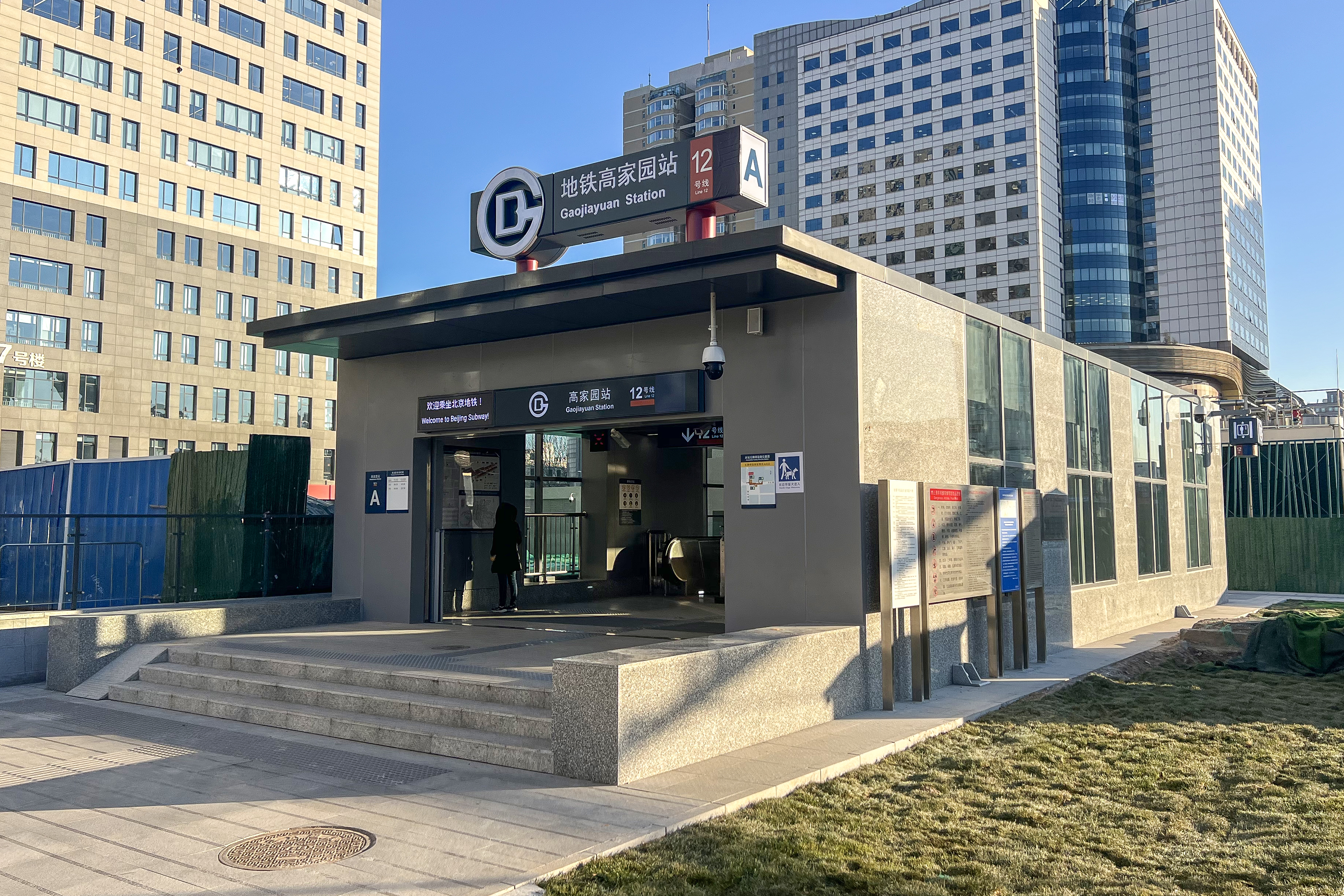
Exit A, Line 12

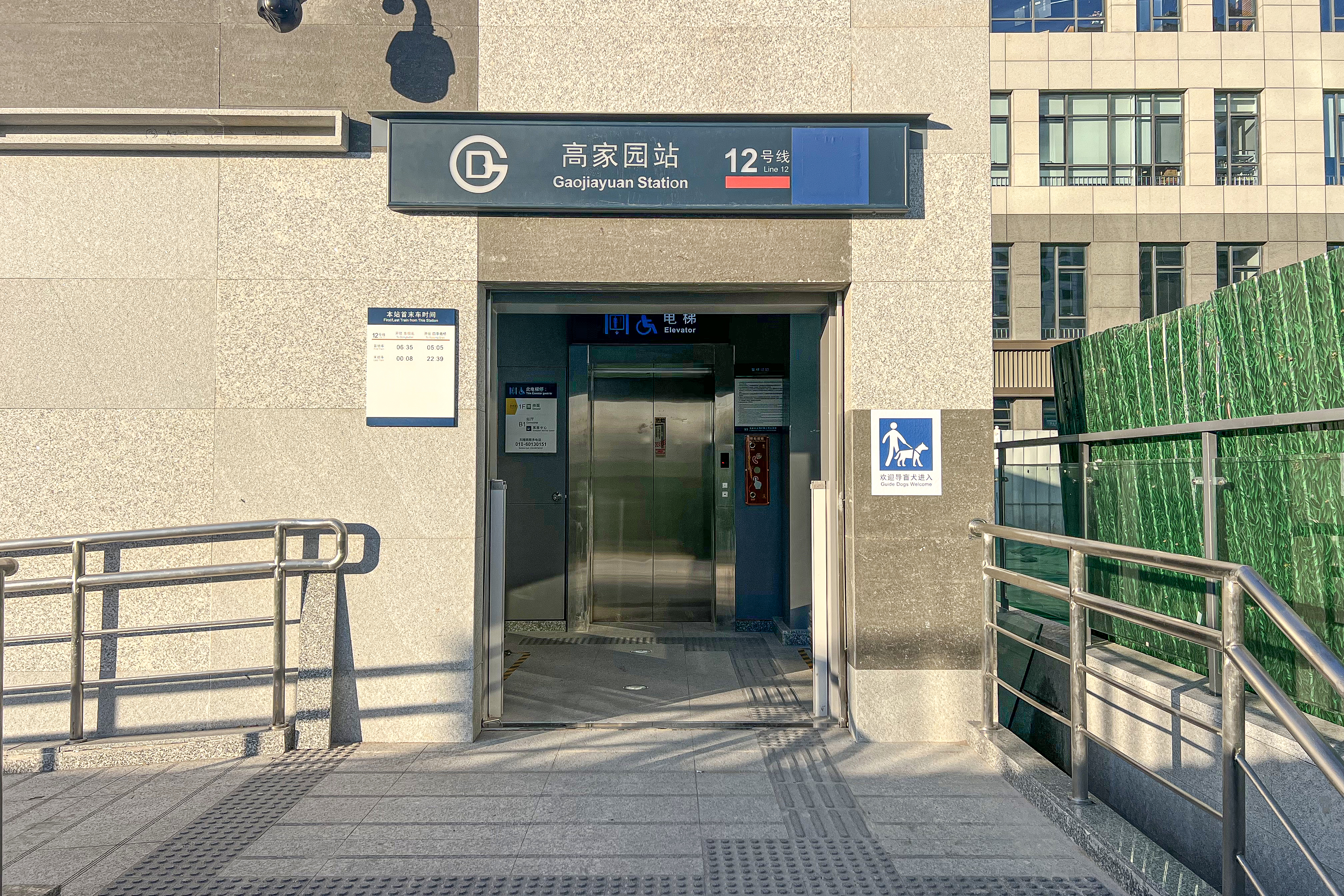
Exit A accessible exit

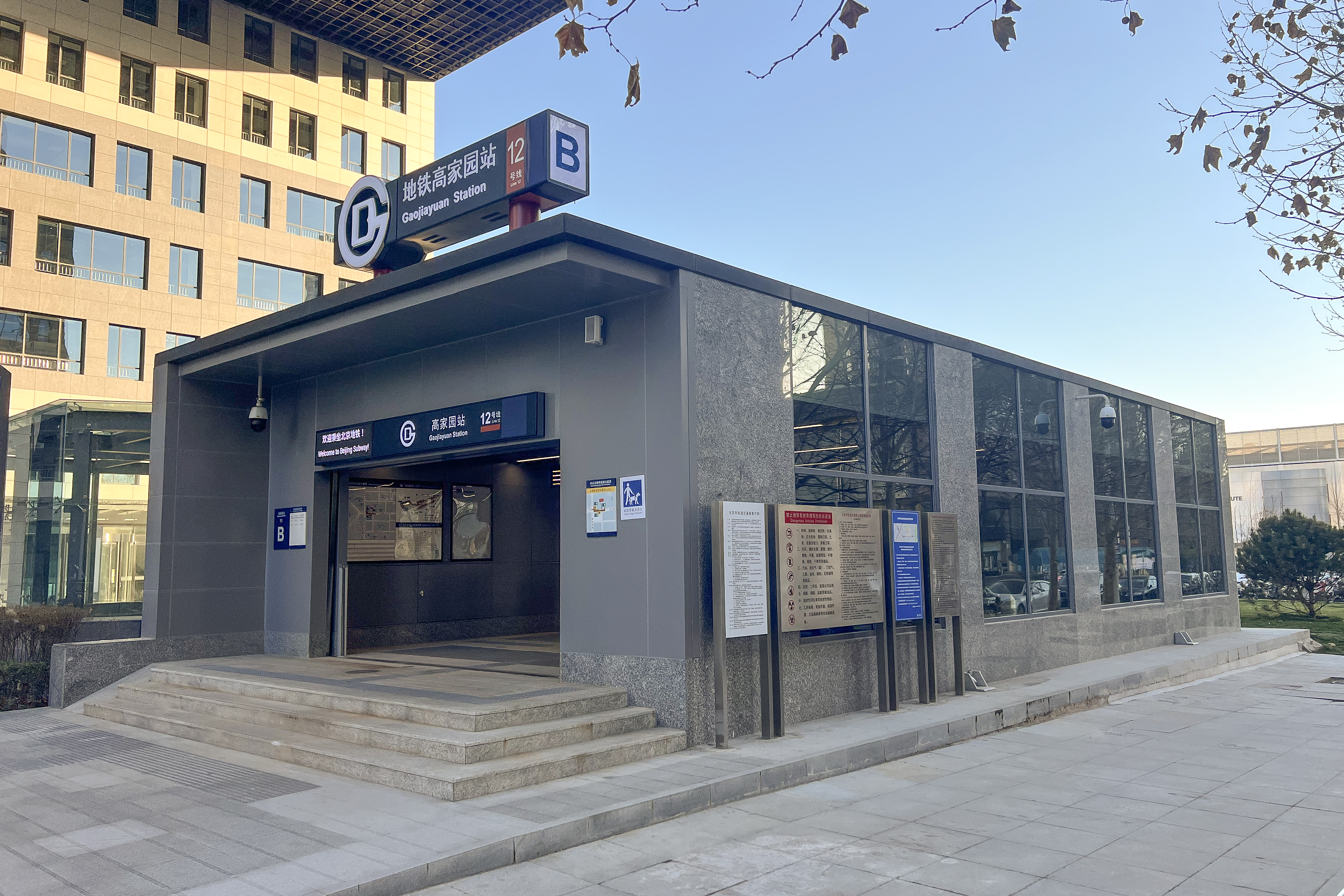
Exit B, Line 12

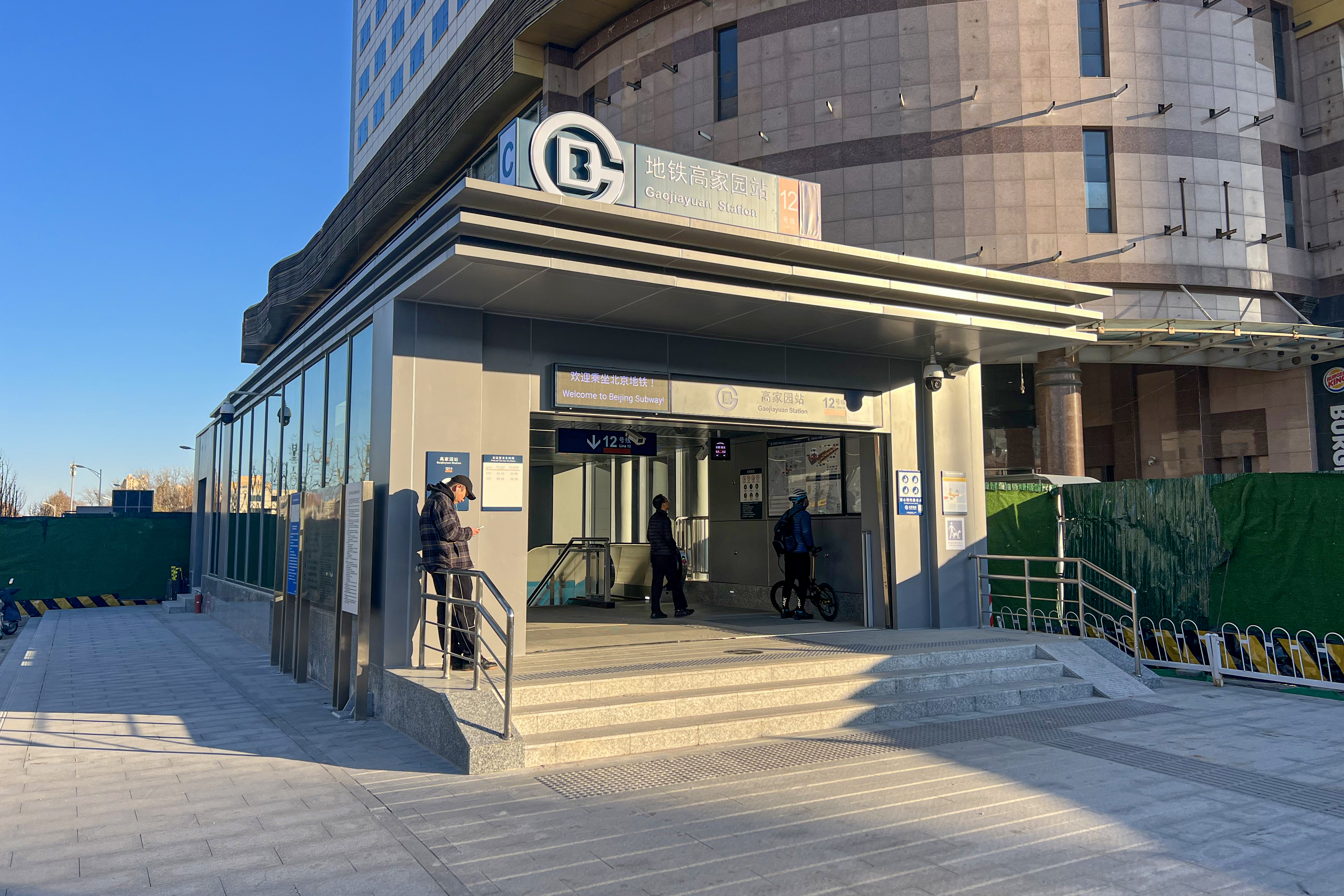
Exit C, Line 12

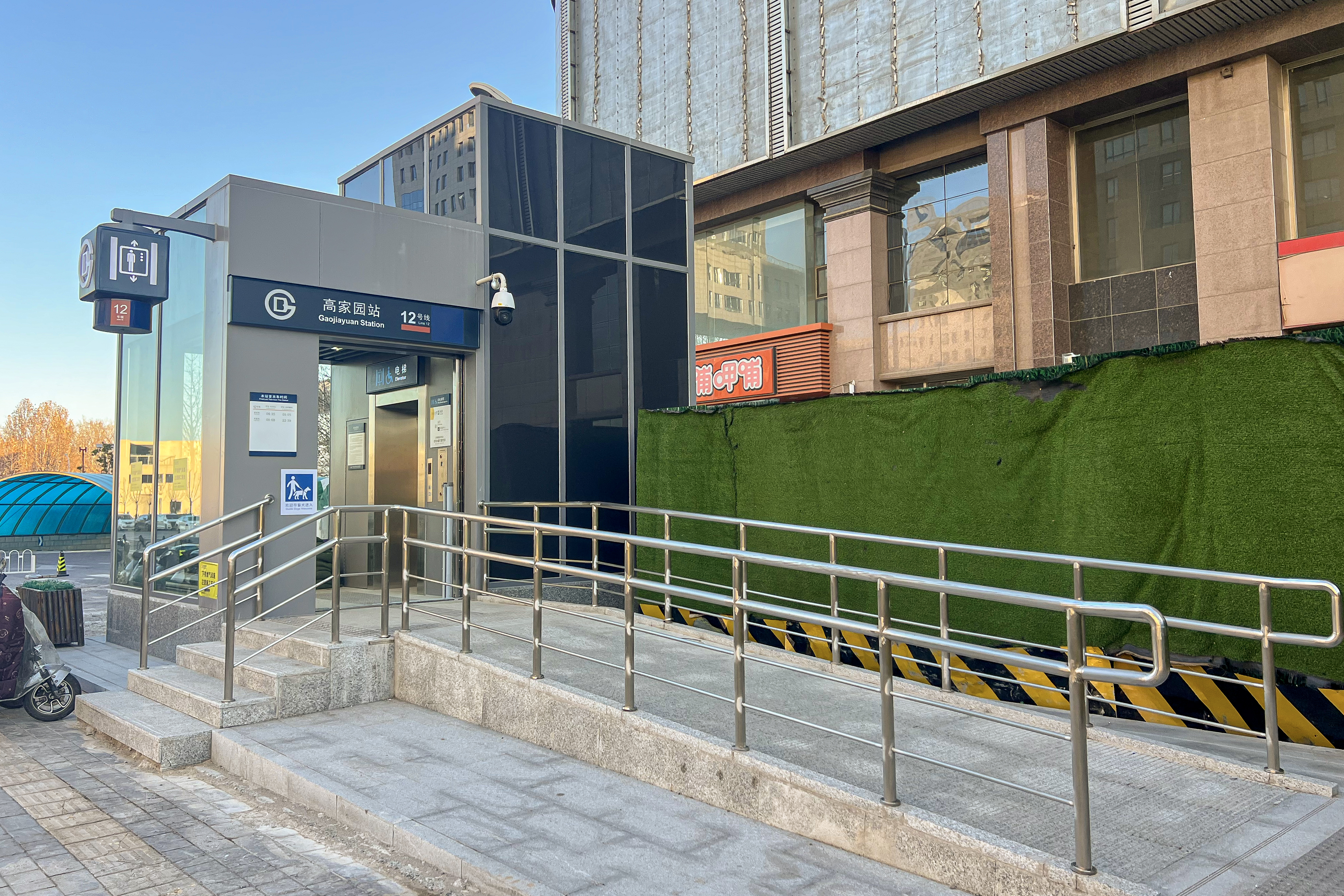
Exit C accessible exit

== Near the station ==
- 798 Art Zone
