= Jiangtaixi station =

Beijing Subway Line 12 station

Jiangtaixi 将台西
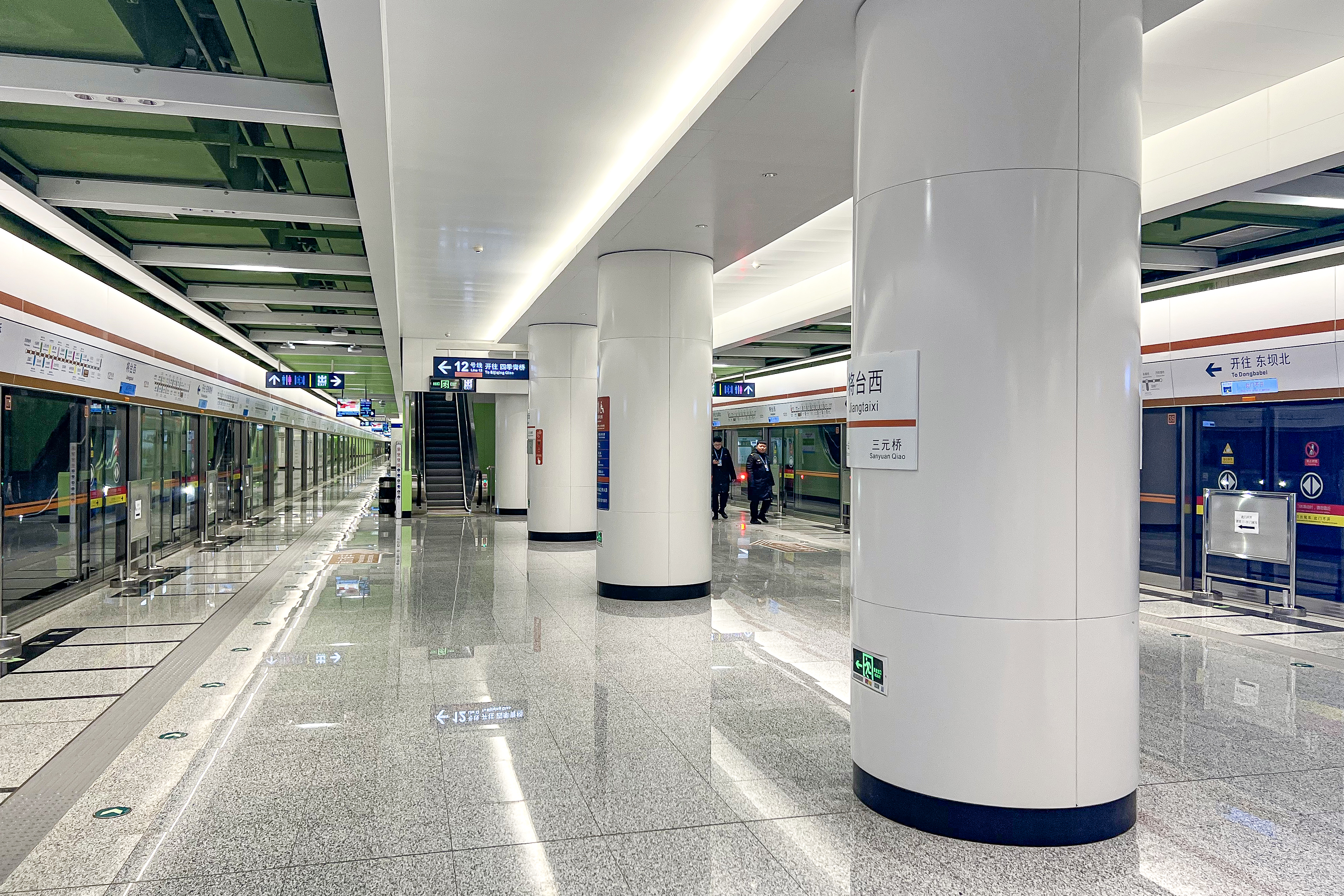
- Platform

Chinese name
- Simplified Chinese: 将台西站
- Traditional Chinese: 將台西站
Transcriptions
Standard Mandarin
- Hanyu Pinyin: Jiàngtáixī zhàn

General information
- Location: Intersection of Fangyuan West Road (芳园西路) and Jiangtai West Road (将台西路), Jiangtai Area; Chaoyang District, Beijing; China
- Coordinates: 39°58′15″N 116°28′24″E
- Operator: Beijing Mass Transit Railway Operation Corporation Limited
- Line: Line 12
- Platforms: 2 (1 island platform)
- Tracks: 2

Construction
- Structure type: Underground
- Accessible: Yes

History
- Opened: December 15, 2024; 20 months ago
- Former names: Fangyuanli (芳园里)

Services
Preceding station	Beijing Subway	Following station
Sanyuan Qiao towards Sijiqing Qiao	Line 12	Gaojiayuan towards Dongbabei
Location
- Location within Beijing

Jiangtaixi station (simplified Chinese: 将台西站; traditional Chinese: 將台西站; pinyin: Jiàngtáixī zhàn) is a station on Line 12 of the Beijing Subway. It opened on December 15, 2024.

== Location ==
The station is located under the intersection of Fangyuan West Road and Jiangtai West Road in the Jiangtai Area in Chaoyang District.

== Station features ==
The station has an underground island platform.

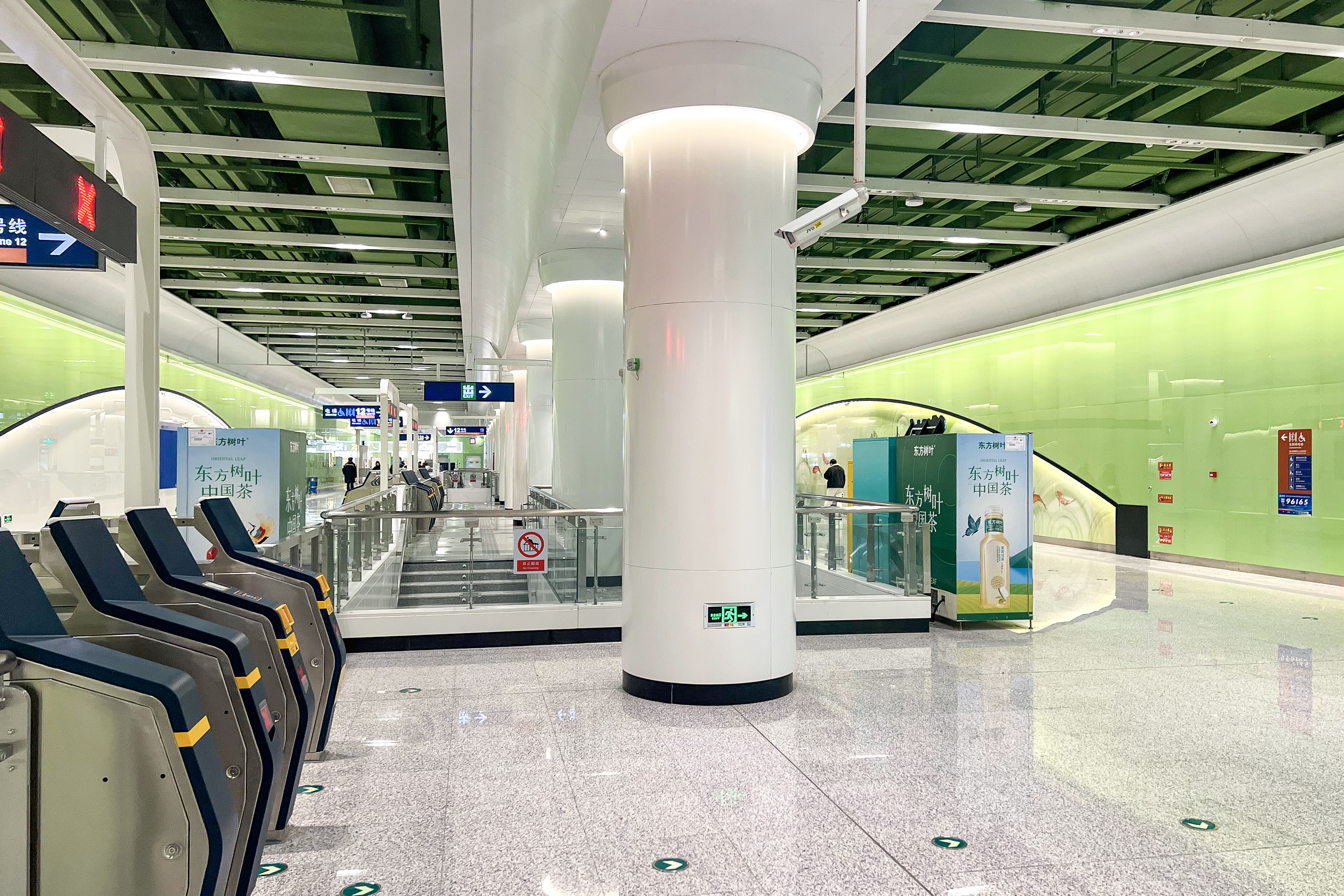
Concourse

== Exits ==
There are 3 exits, lettered A, B and C. Exit B has an accessible elevator.

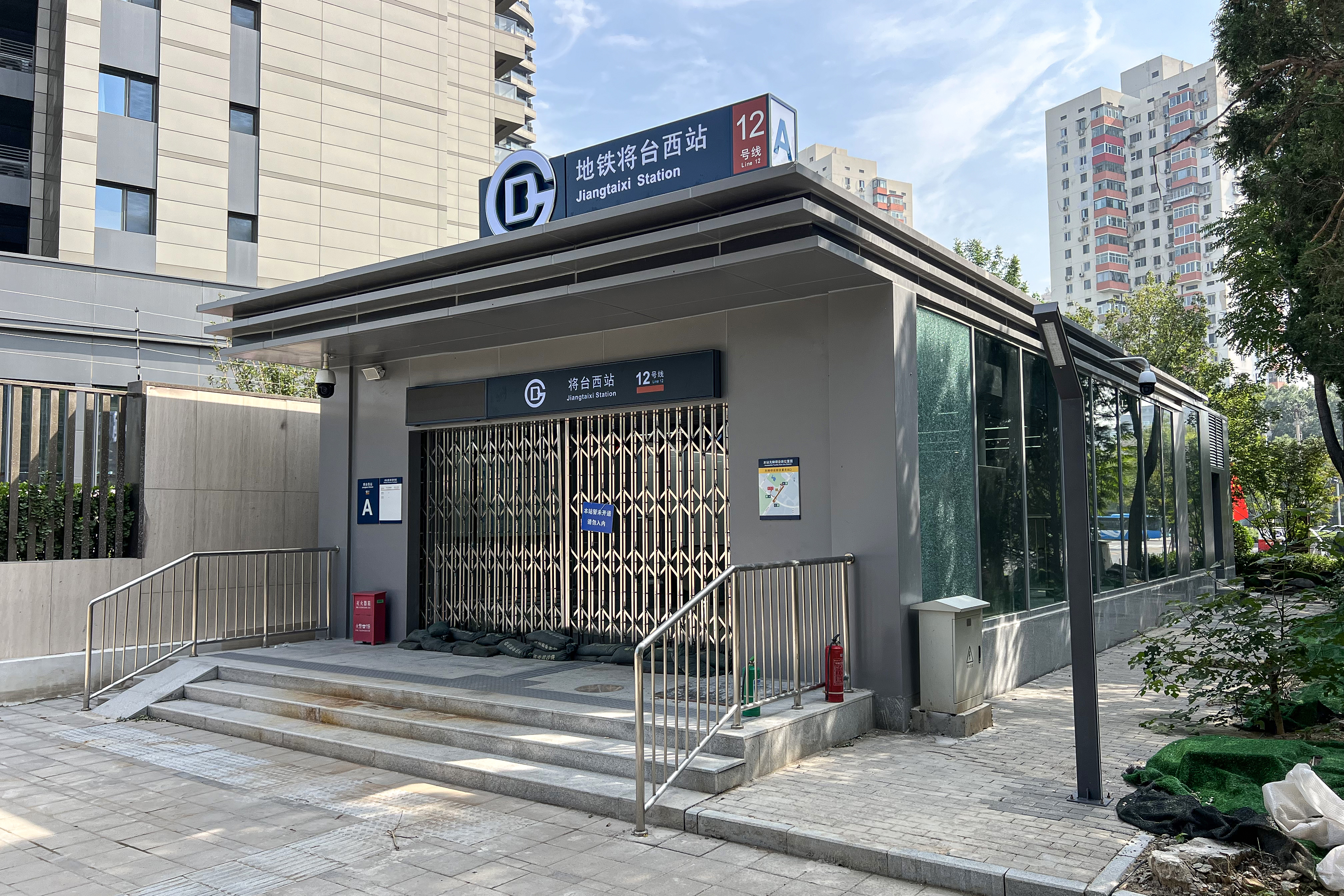
Exit A

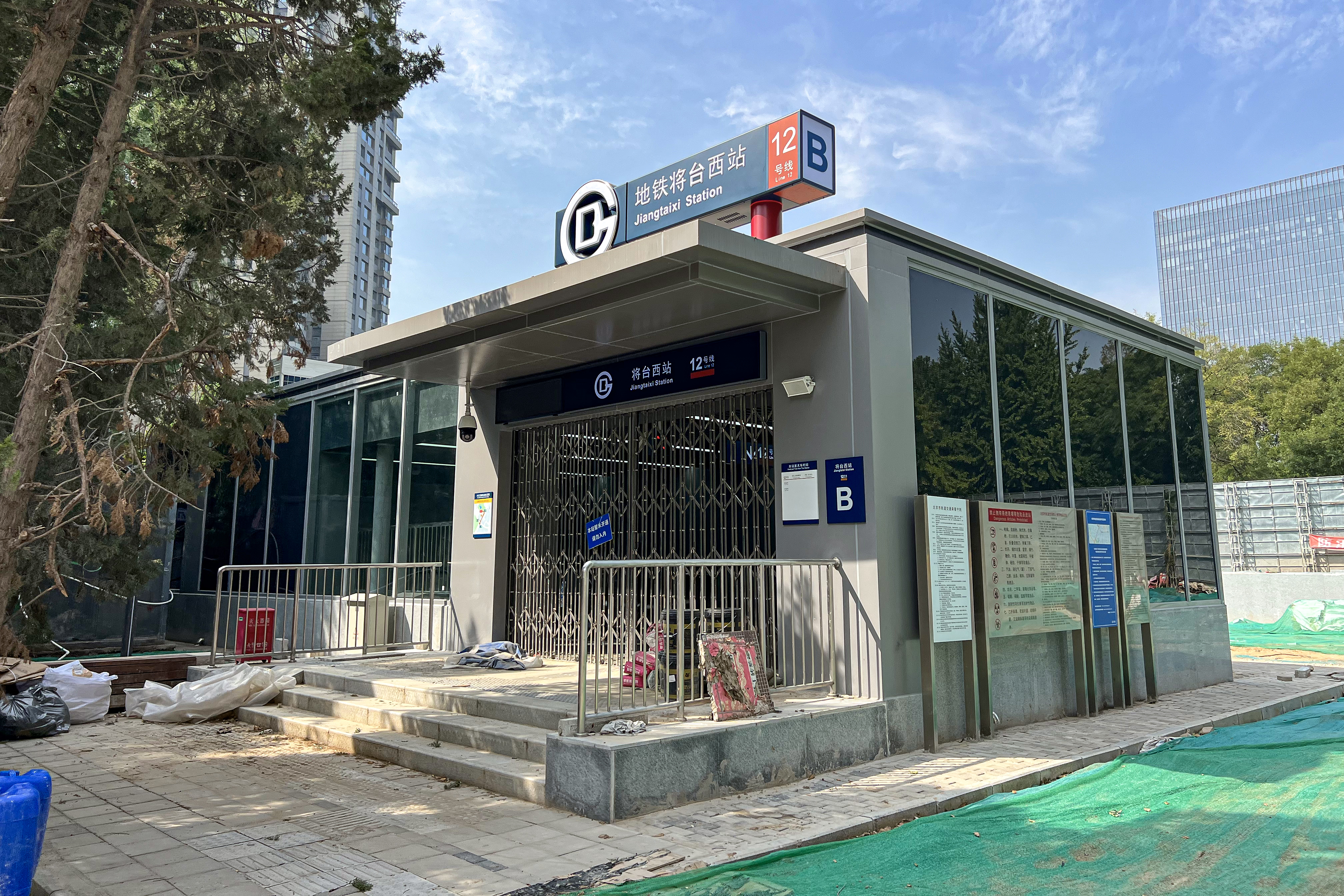
Exit B

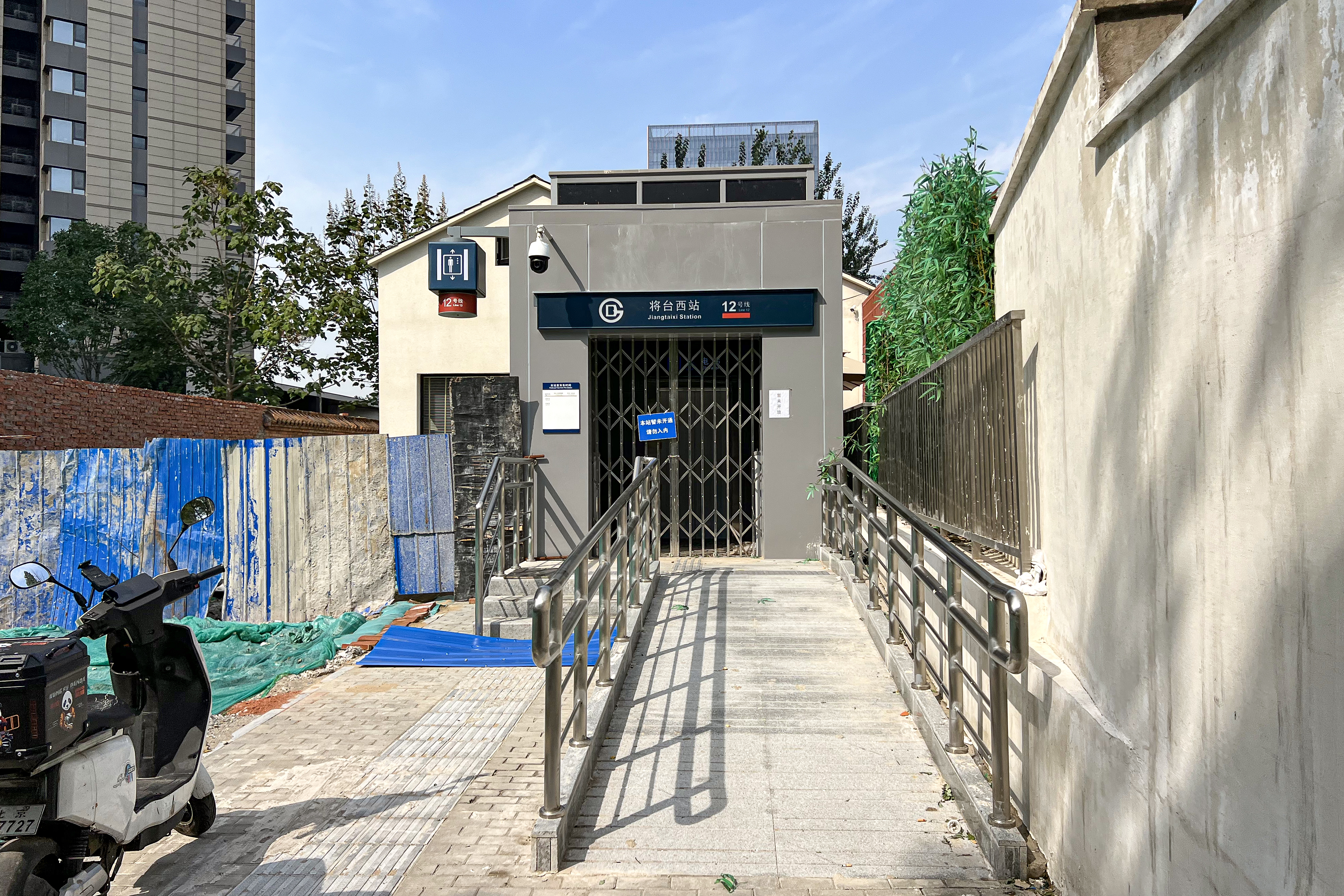
Exit B accessible exit

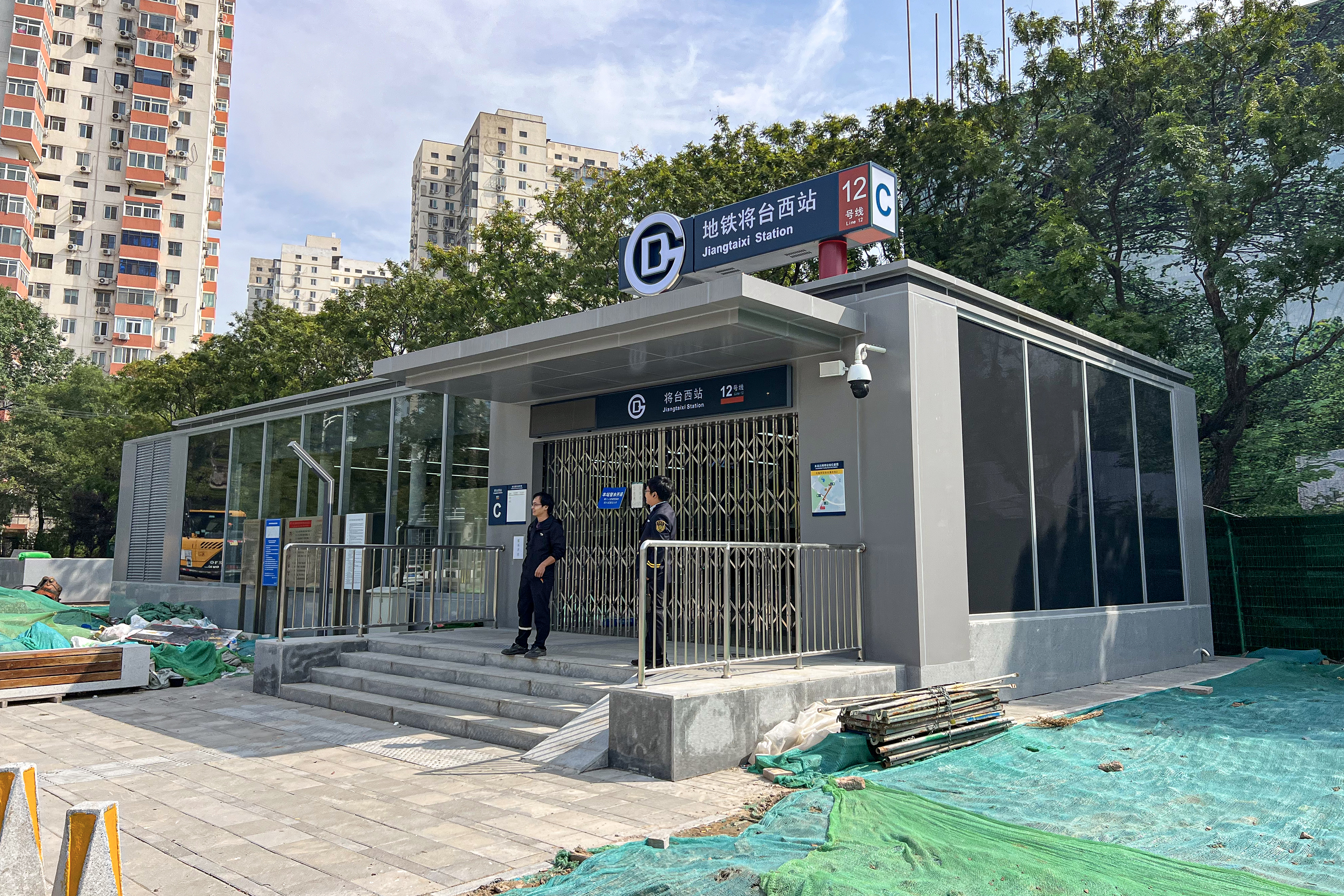
Exit C

== History ==
The station was previously named as Fangyuanli (Chinese: 芳园里; pinyin: Fāngyuánlǐ). It was officially renamed to Jiangtaixi on January 3, 2024.
