= Jiangtai, Beijing =

Jiangtai Township 将台乡
- Township
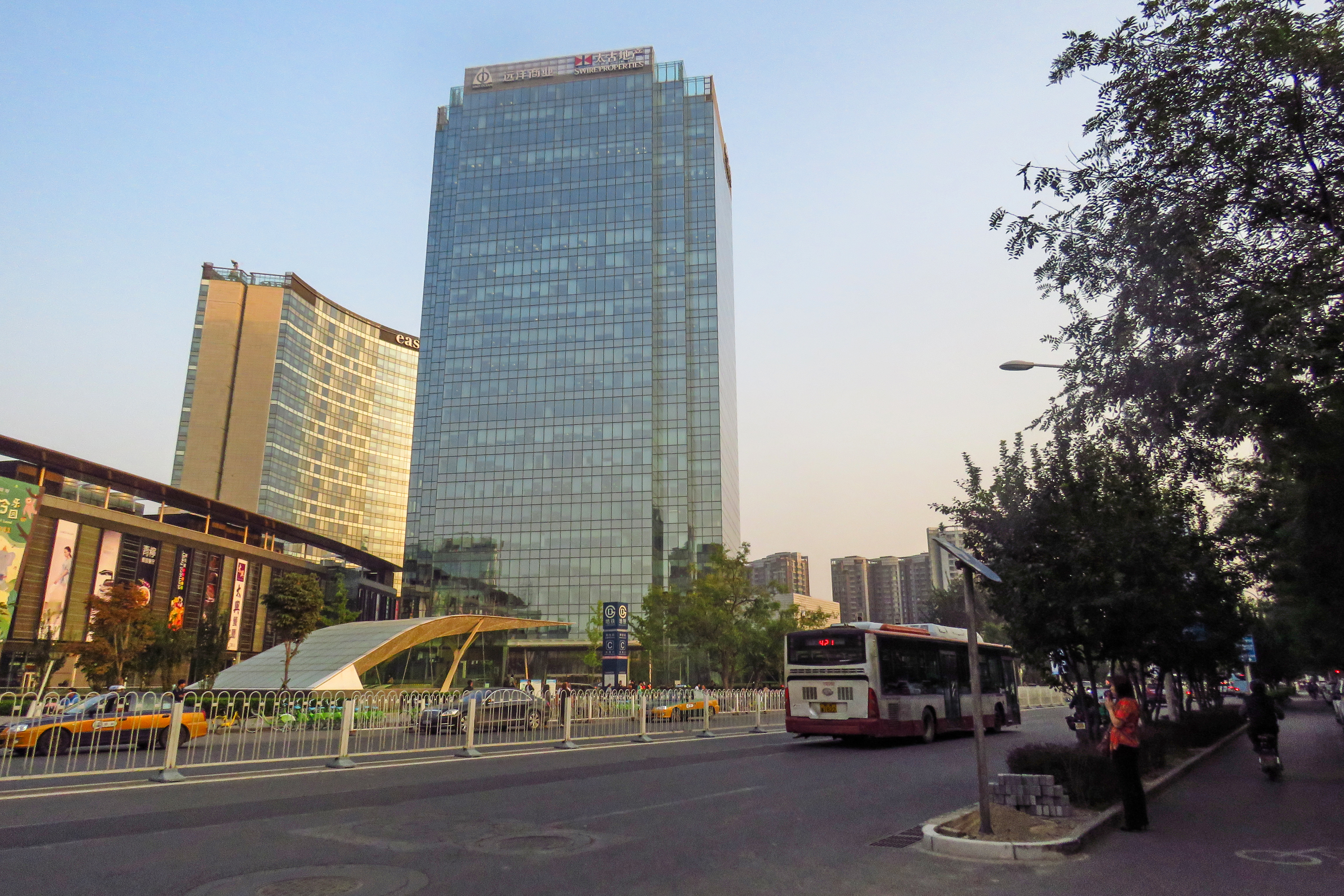
- INDIGO within the subdistrict, 2017

- Location within Beijing Location within China
- Coordinates: 39°58′04″N 116°28′58″E
- Country: China
- Municipality: Beijing
- District: Chaoyang
- Village-level Divisions: 11 communities 2 villages

Area
  - Total: 11.45 km^{2} (4.42 sq mi)

Population (2020)
  - Total: 53,714
  - Density: 4,691/km^{2} (12,150/sq mi)
- Time zone: UTC+8 (China Standard)
- Postal code: 100016
- Area code: 010

Jiangtai Township (Chinese: 将台乡; pinyin: Jiàngtái Xiāng) is a township on the northern portion of Chaoyang District, Beijing, China. It borders Wangjing, Jiuxianqiao Subdistricts and Cuigezhuang Township to the north, Dongba Township to the east, Jiuxianqiao, Maizidian Subdistricts and Dongfeng Township to the south, and Taiyanggong Township to the west. In 2020, it has a total population of 53,714.

The township got its name Jiangtai (Chinese: 将台; pinyin: Jiàngtái; lit. 'General Stage') from the site of former ritual stage found in the region. It was used in a ceremony to officially promote generals during the 4th century.

== History ==
Timeline of changes in the status of Jiangtai Township
Year	Status
1947	Part of the 8th District
1949	Part of the 10th District
1952	Part of Dongjiao District
1958	Part of People's Commune of Chaoyang
1961	Separated from Chaoyang and formed its own commune
1983	Changed to a township
1993	Became an area while retaining township status

== Administrative Divisions ==
As of 2021, there are a total of 13 subdivisions under Jiangtai, in which 11 were communities and 2 were villages:

Administrative Division Code	Type	Community Name in English	Community Name in Simplified Chinese
110105023009	Community	Lidu	丽都
110105023015	Community	Fangyuanli	芳园里
110105023016	Community	Anjialou	安家楼
110105023017	Community	Shui'an Jiayuan	水岸家园
110105023018	Community	Jiangfu Jiayuan	将府家园
110105023019	Community	Fangu Shuijun	梵谷水郡
110105023020	Community	Kandu Jiayuan	瞰都嘉园
110105023021	Community	Tuofangying Beili	驼房营北里
110105023022	Community	Yangguang Shangdong	阳光上东
110105023023	Community	Jiangfu Jinyuandong	将府锦苑东
110105023024	Community	Jiangfu Jinyuanxi	将府锦苑西
110105023201	Village	Tuofangying	驼房营
110105023202	Village	Dong Bajianfang	东八间房

== See also ==
- List of township-level divisions of Beijing
