= Jiuxianqiao Subdistrict =

Jiuxianqiao Subdistrict 酒仙桥街道
- Subdistrict
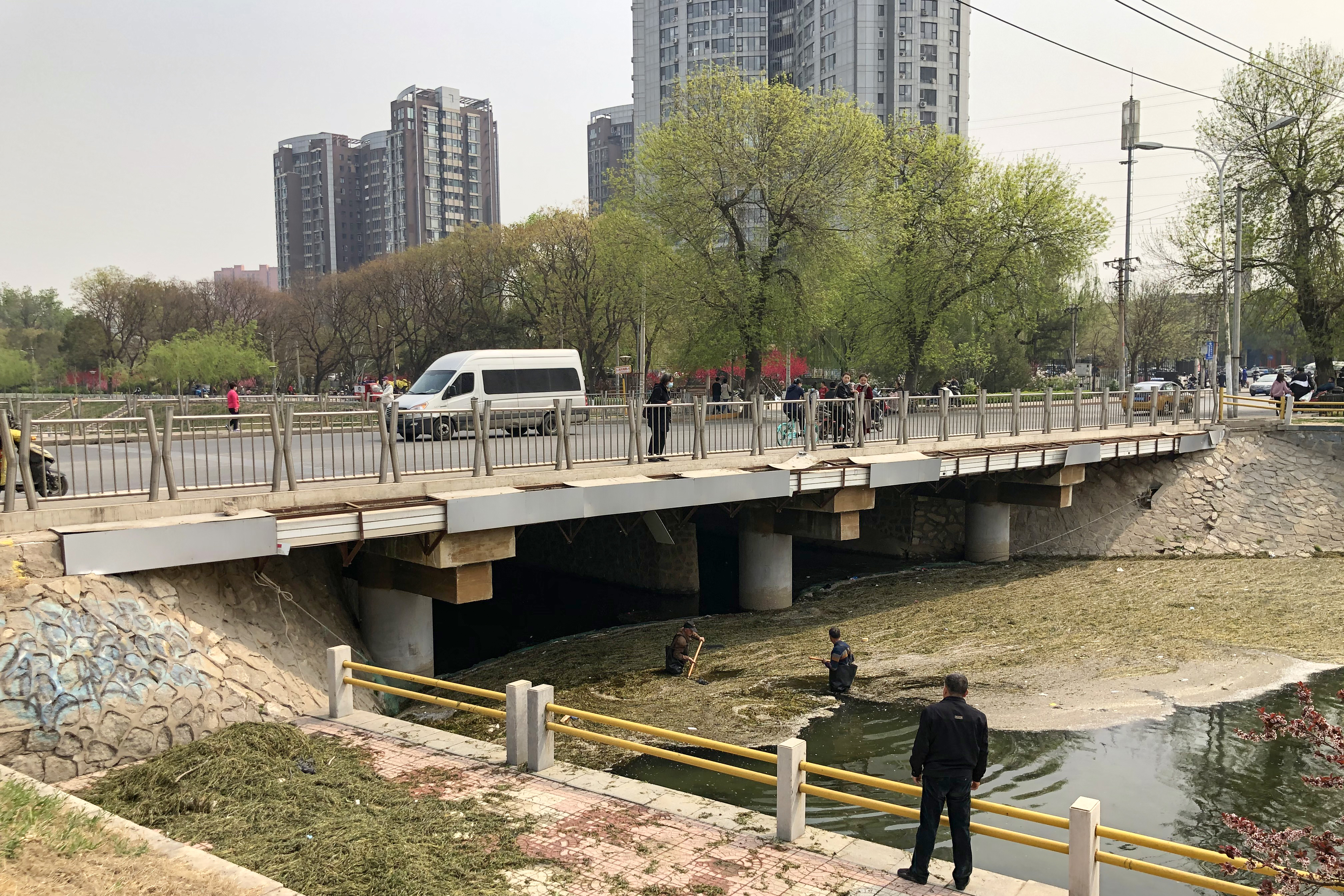
- Jiuxian Bridge, 2021

- Location within Beijing Location within China
- Coordinates: 39°57′50″N 116°29′06″E
- Country: China
- Municipality: Beijing
- District: Chaoyang

Area
  - Total: 5.3 km^{2} (2.0 sq mi)

Population (2020)
  - Total: 63,910
  - Density: 12,000/km^{2} (31,000/sq mi)
- Time zone: UTC+8 (China Standard)
- Postal code: 100016
- Area code: 010

Jiuxianqiao Subdistrict (Chinese: 酒仙桥街道; pinyin: Jiǔxiānqiáo Jiēdào) is a subdistrict within Chaoyang District, Beijing, China. It borders Chuigezhuang Township to the north and east, Dongfeng Township to the south, Jiangtai Township to the west, Donghu and Wangjing Subdistrict to the northwest. As of 2020, it has a total population of 63,910.

The subdistrict was named after Jiuxianqiao (Chinese: 酒仙桥; lit. 'Bridge of the Alcohol Immortal'), a bridge within the area. There is a local legend where an alcohol immortal accidentally dropped his liquor under the bridge, and the river started to produce a nice scent ever since.

== History ==
Timeline of changes in the status of Jiuxianqiao Subdistrict
| Time | Status |
|---|---|
| Ming dynasty | Part of Daxing County |
| 1947 | Part of 19th Suburban District |
| 1950 | People's Government of Jiuxianqiao was established as part of 13th Suburban District |
| 1952 | Part of East Suburban District |
| 1957 | Formally established as Jiuxianqiao Subdistrict |
| 1958 | Transferred under Chaoyang District |
| 1968 | Renamed Donghong Road Subdistrict |
| 1975 | Renamed Jiuxianqiao Subdistrict |

== Administrative Division ==
As of 2021, the subdistrict has 11 communities under it:

| Administrative Division Code | Community Name in English | Community Name in Simplified Chinese |
|---|---|---|
| 110105011041 | Dianziqiuchang | 电子球场 |
| 110105011042 | Donglu | 东路 |
| 110105011043 | Hongxialu | 红霞路 |
| 110105011044 | Nanlu | 南路 |
| 110105011045 | Zhongbeilu | 中北路 |
| 110105011046 | Dashanzi | 大山子 |
| 110105011047 | Gaojiayuan | 高家园 |
| 110105011048 | Yisiyuan | 怡思苑 |
| 110105011049 | Tuofangying Xili | 驼房营西里 |
| 110105011050 | Wanghonglu | 万红路 |
| 110105011051 | Yinhewan | 银河湾 |
