= Zhufangbei station =

Beijing Subway station

Zhufangbei 朱房北
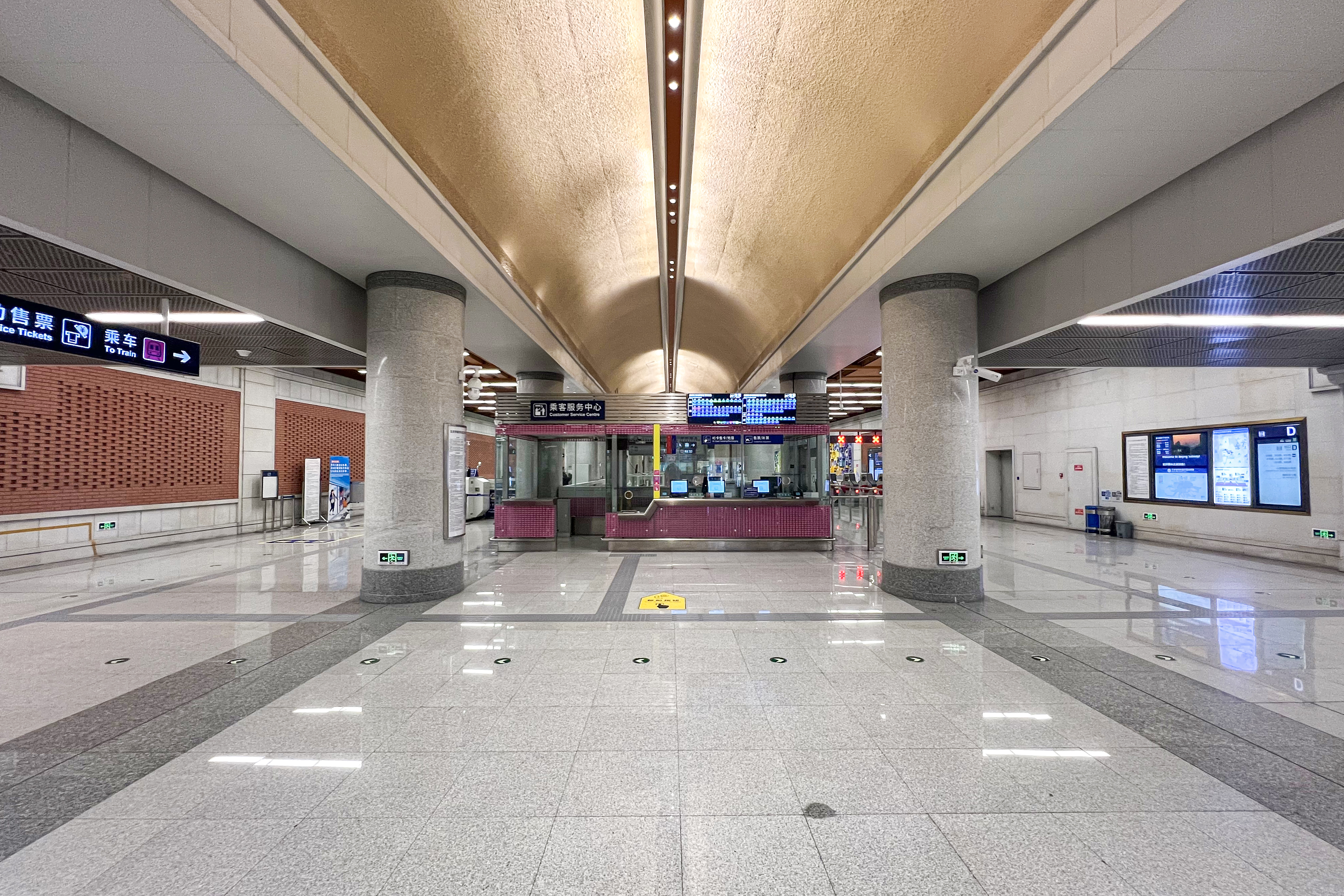
- Concourse

General information
- Location: Intersection of Xiaoying Road West (小营西路) and Zhufangbei 1st Street (朱房北一街); Qinghe Subdistrict, Haidian District, Beijing; China
- Coordinates: 40.03457°N 116.32467°E
- Operator: Beijing Mass Transit Railway Operation Corporation Limited
- Line: Changping line
- Platforms: 2 (1 island platform)
- Tracks: 2

Construction
- Structure type: Underground
- Accessible: Yes

History
- Opened: December 15, 2024; 22 months ago

Services
Preceding station	Beijing Subway	Following station
Qinghe railway station towards Changping Xishankou	Changping line	Qinghe Xiaoyingqiao towards Jimen Qiao
Location
- Location within Beijing

Zhufangbei station (Chinese: 朱房北站; pinyin: Zhūfángběi zhàn) is a subway station on the Changping line of the Beijing Subway. As this is an infill station, it did not open with the rest of the line in its initial extension phase. Instead, it opened on December 15, 2024.

== Station art ==
The wall of the paid area of the concourse is decorated with a public artwork called "Neighborhood".

== Exits ==
There are 3 exits, lettered A, C and D. Exits A and D have accessible elevators. Due to the land occupation of the Golden Collar Era Office Building, the long-term implementation conditions will be reserved for Exit B.

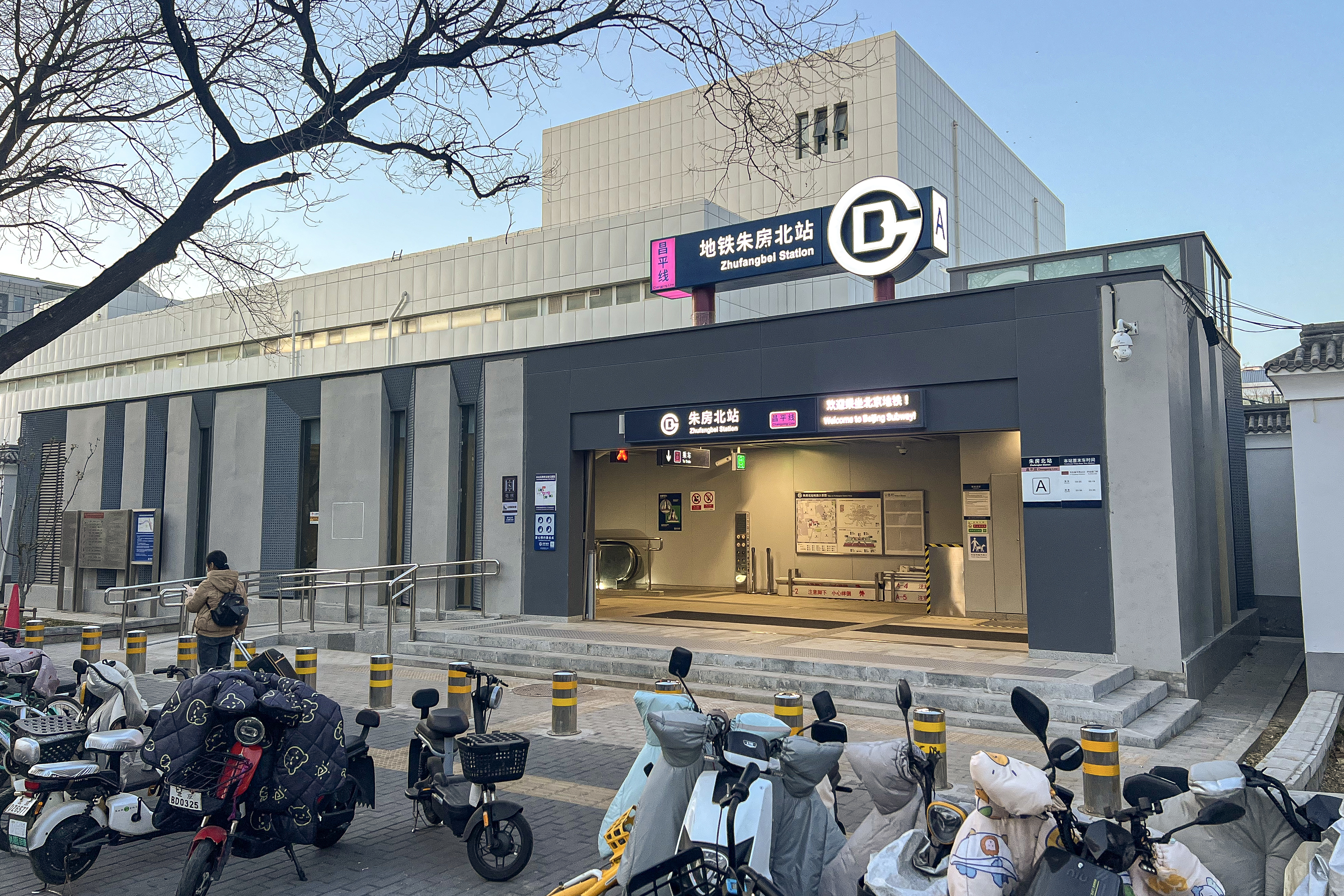
Exit A

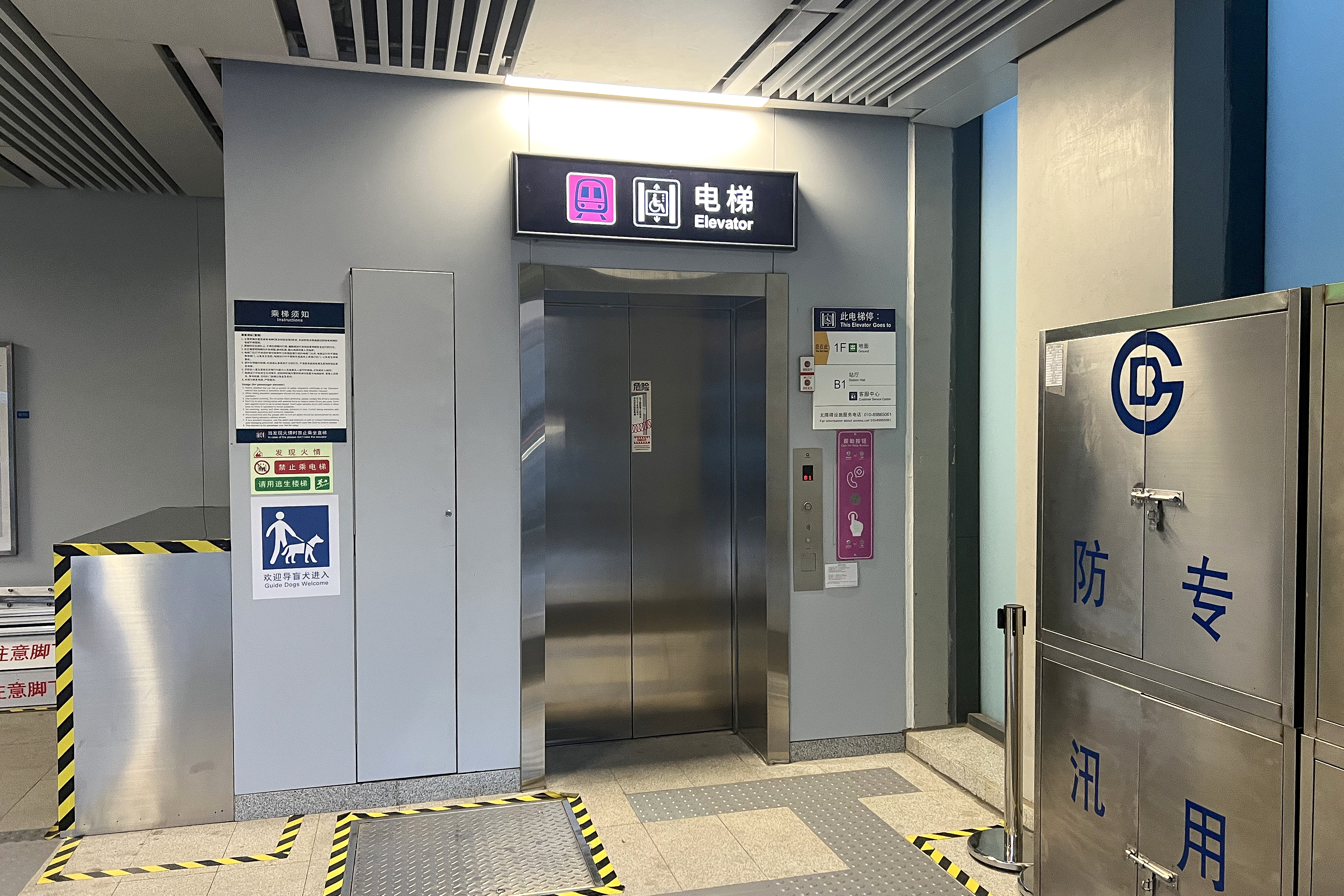
Exit A elevator exit

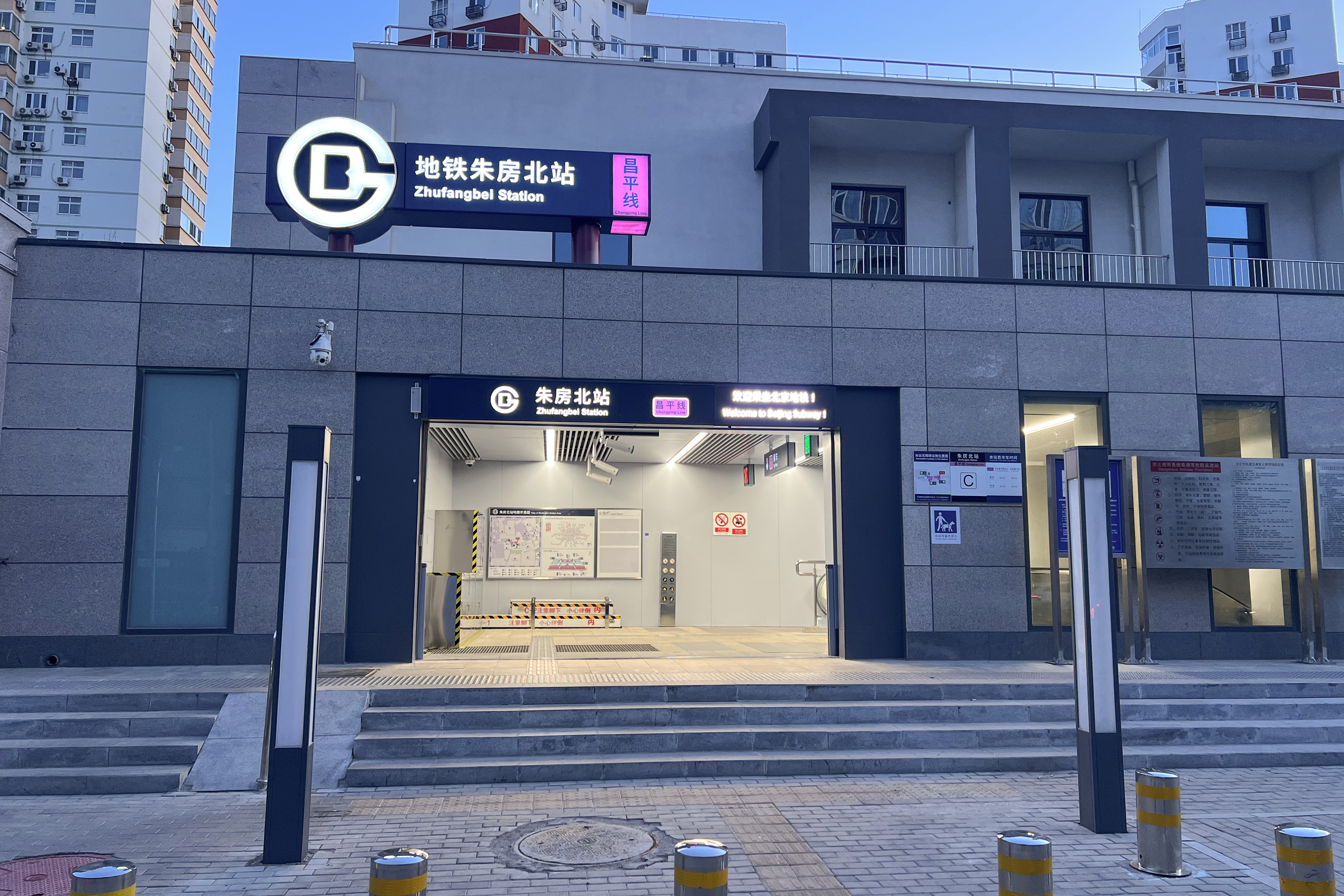
Exit C

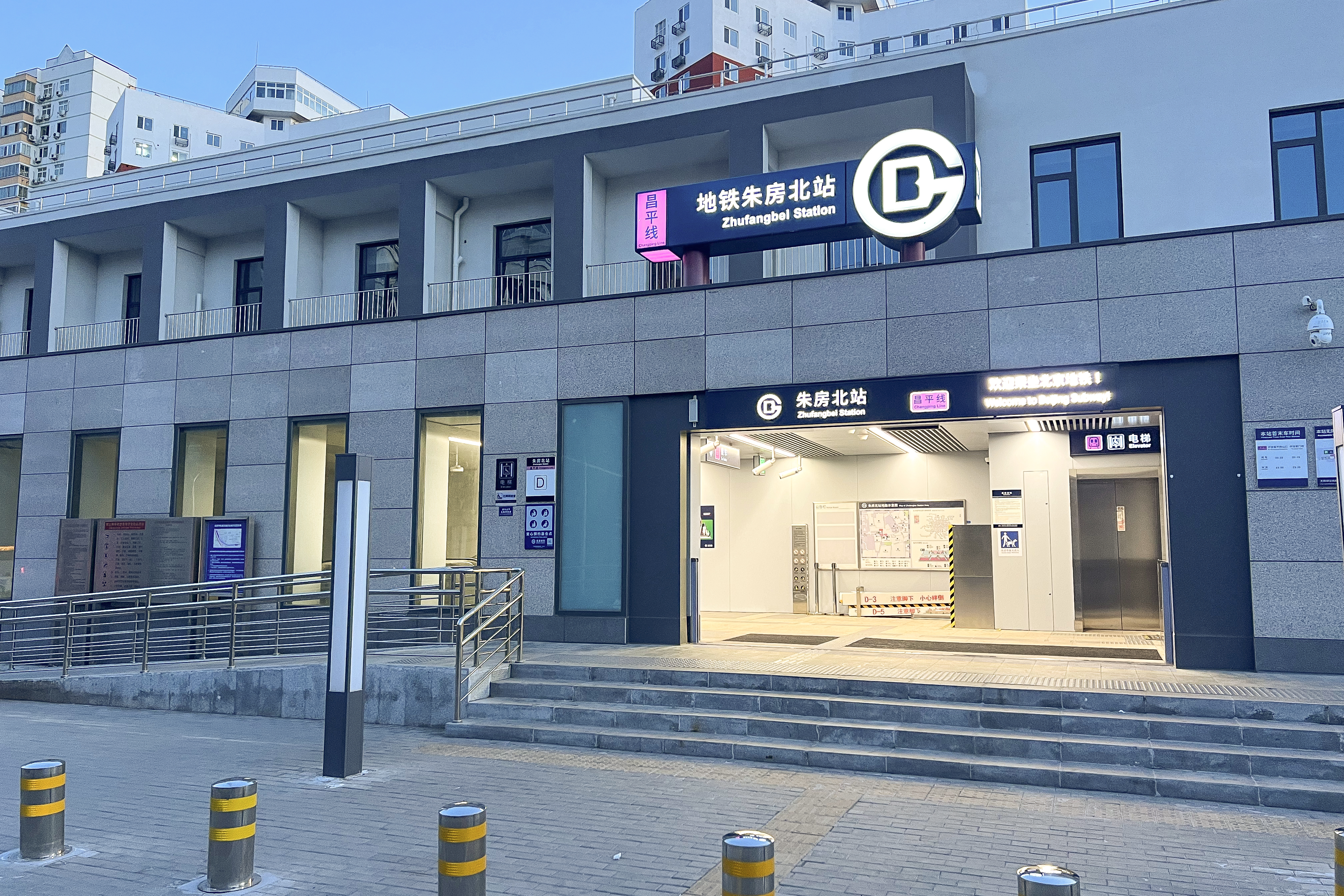
Exit D

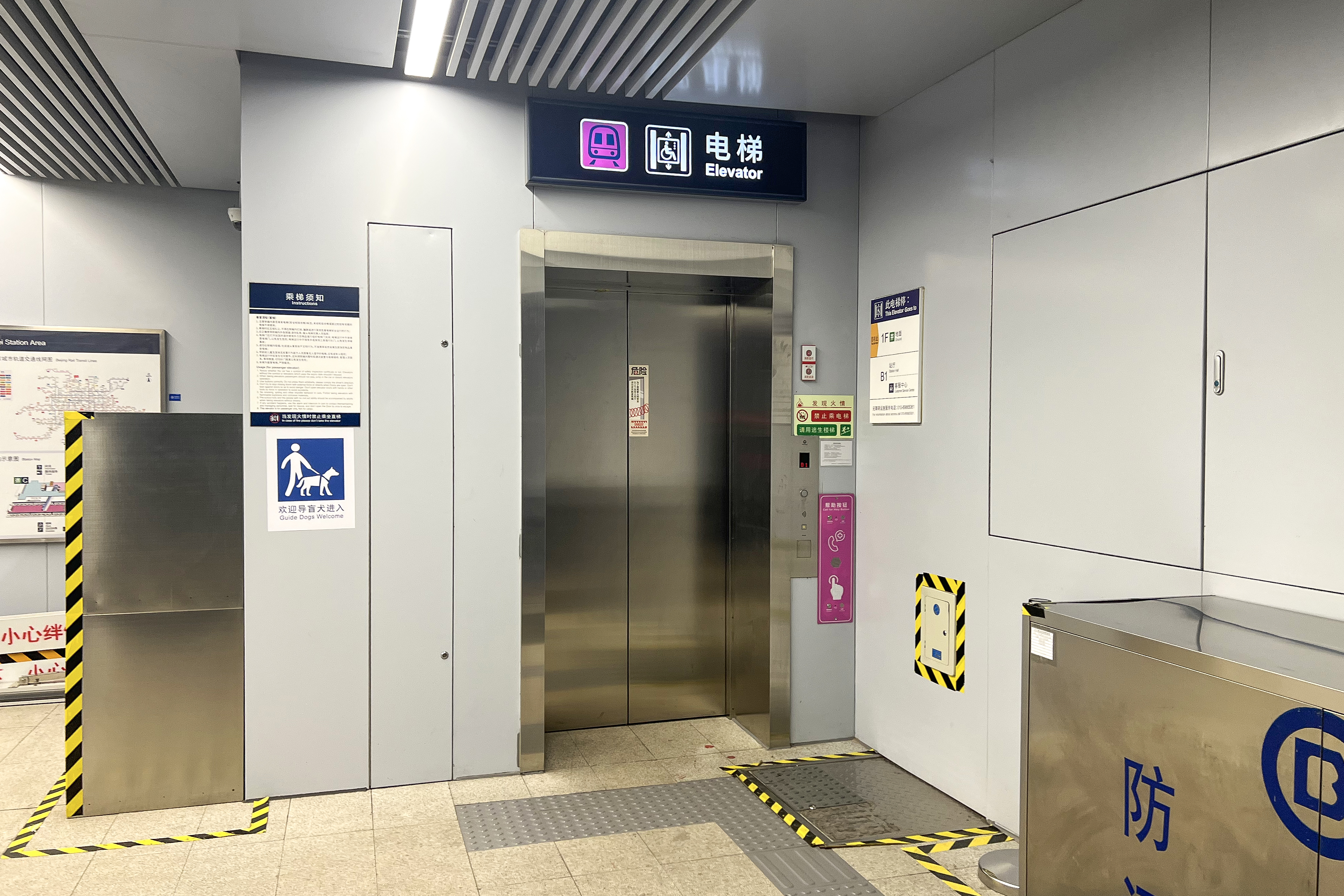
Exit D elevator exit

== History ==
During planning in March 2019, the project name for this station was called Xiaoyingxilu station. On July 19, 2021, in the naming plan for the stations on the southern section of the Changping Line announced by the Beijing Municipal Commission of Planning and Natural Resources, the station name was adjusted to Zhufangbei station. In June 2022, the station was officially named Zhufangbei station.

On February 4, 2023, the southern extension of Changping line from Qinghe railway station to Xitucheng commenced operations, but the station's construction was not finished, so trains passed the station without stopping.

On May 8, 2024, the unit project passed the site acceptance. On September 25, the initial fire inspection failed. On November 26, the station passed the fire inspection. On December 15, the station commenced operations.
