= Zhuxinzhuang station =

Beijing Subway interchange station

Zhuxinzhuang 朱辛庄
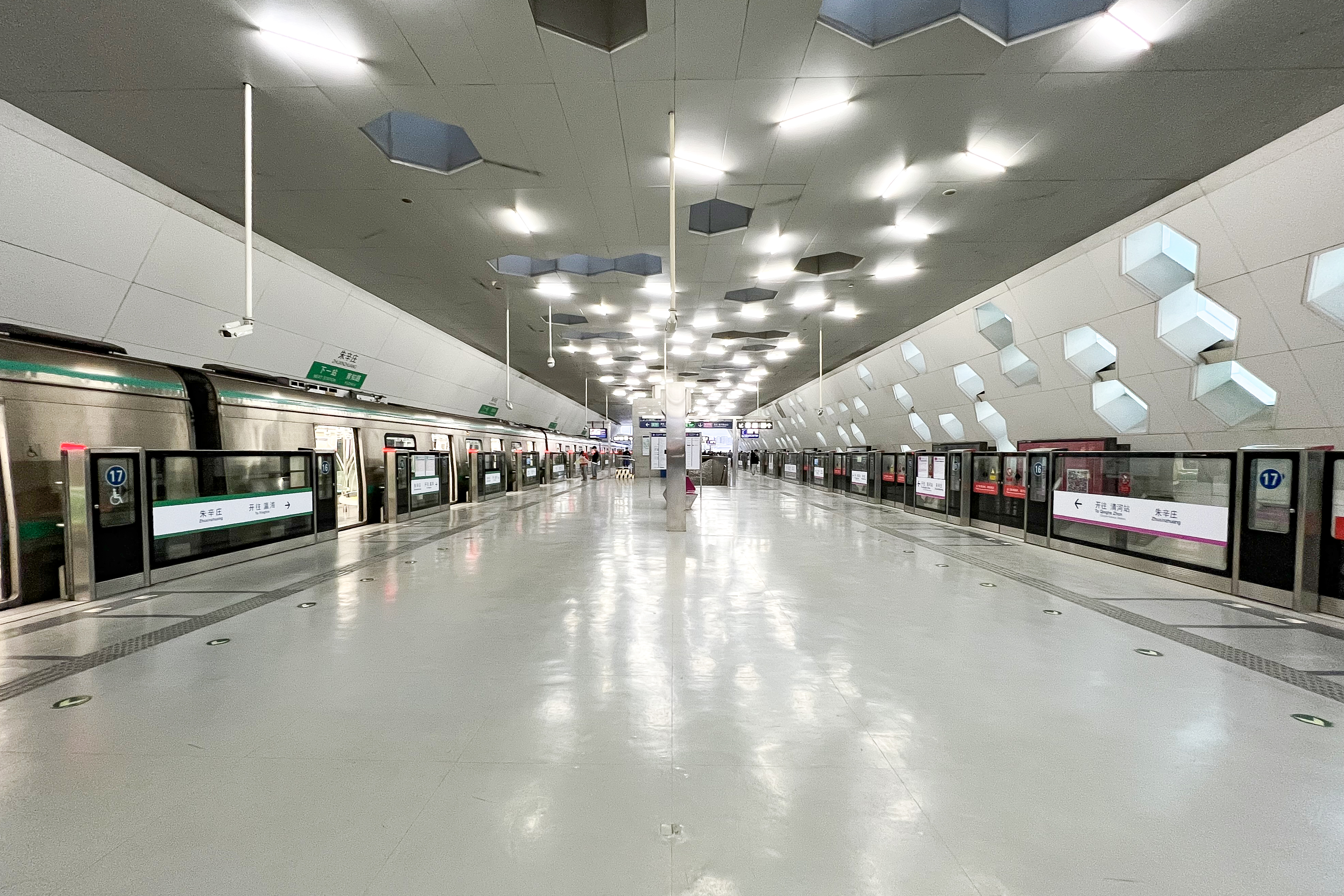
- Southbound platform

General information
- Location: Huichang East Road (回昌东路); Shigezhuang Subdistrict, Changping District, Beijing; China
- Coordinates: 40°06′15″N 116°18′49″E
- Operator: Beijing Mass Transit Railway Operation Corporation Limited
- Lines: Line 8; Changping line
- Platforms: 4 (2 island platforms)
- Tracks: 4

Construction
- Structure type: Elevated
- Accessible: Yes

History
- Opened: December 28, 2013; 12 years ago (Line 8); December 30, 2010; 15 years ago (Changping line)

Services
Preceding station	Beijing Subway	Following station
Terminus	Line 8	Yuzhi Lu towards Yinghai
Gonghua Cheng towards Changping Xishankou	Changping line	Life Science Park towards Jimen Qiao
Location
- Location within Beijing

Zhuxinzhuang station (simplified Chinese: 朱辛庄站; traditional Chinese: 朱辛莊站; pinyin: Zhūxīnzhuāng zhàn) is a station on Line 8 and Changping Line of the Beijing Subway.

It is a cross-platform interchange between the two lines. The Line 8 tracks are the inner tracks, while the Changping Line tracks are the outer tracks. It is the current northern terminus of Line 8.

== Station layout ==
The station has elevated dual-island platforms with a cross platform interchange. On one side, originating Line 8 trains interchange with southbound Changping Line trains to Xitucheng, whilst on the other, terminating Line 8 trains interchange with northbound Changping Line trains towards Changping Xishankou.

== Exits ==
There are 4 exits, lettered A1, A2, B1, and B2. Exits A2 and B2 are wheelchair accessible.

== Gallery ==
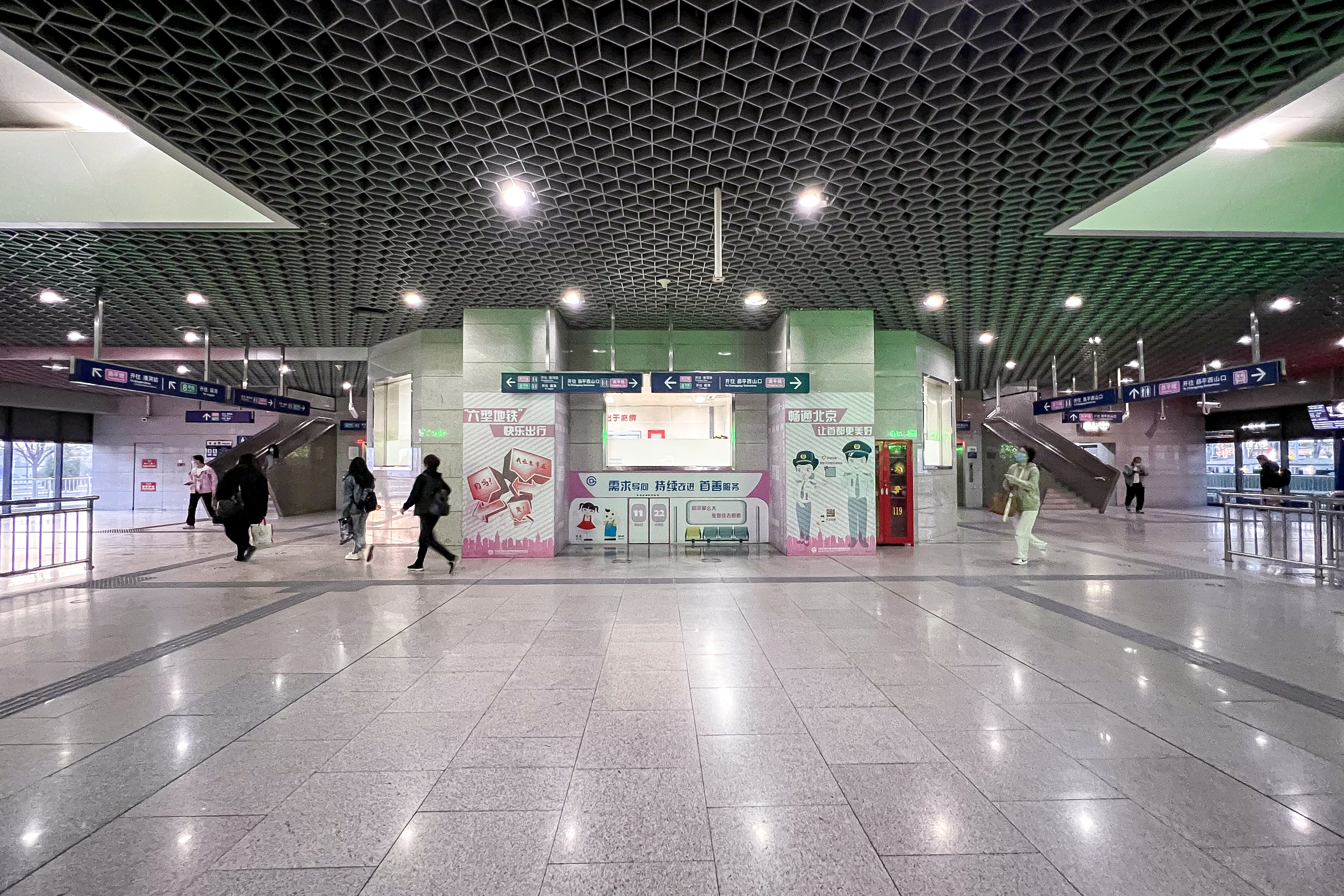
South concourse

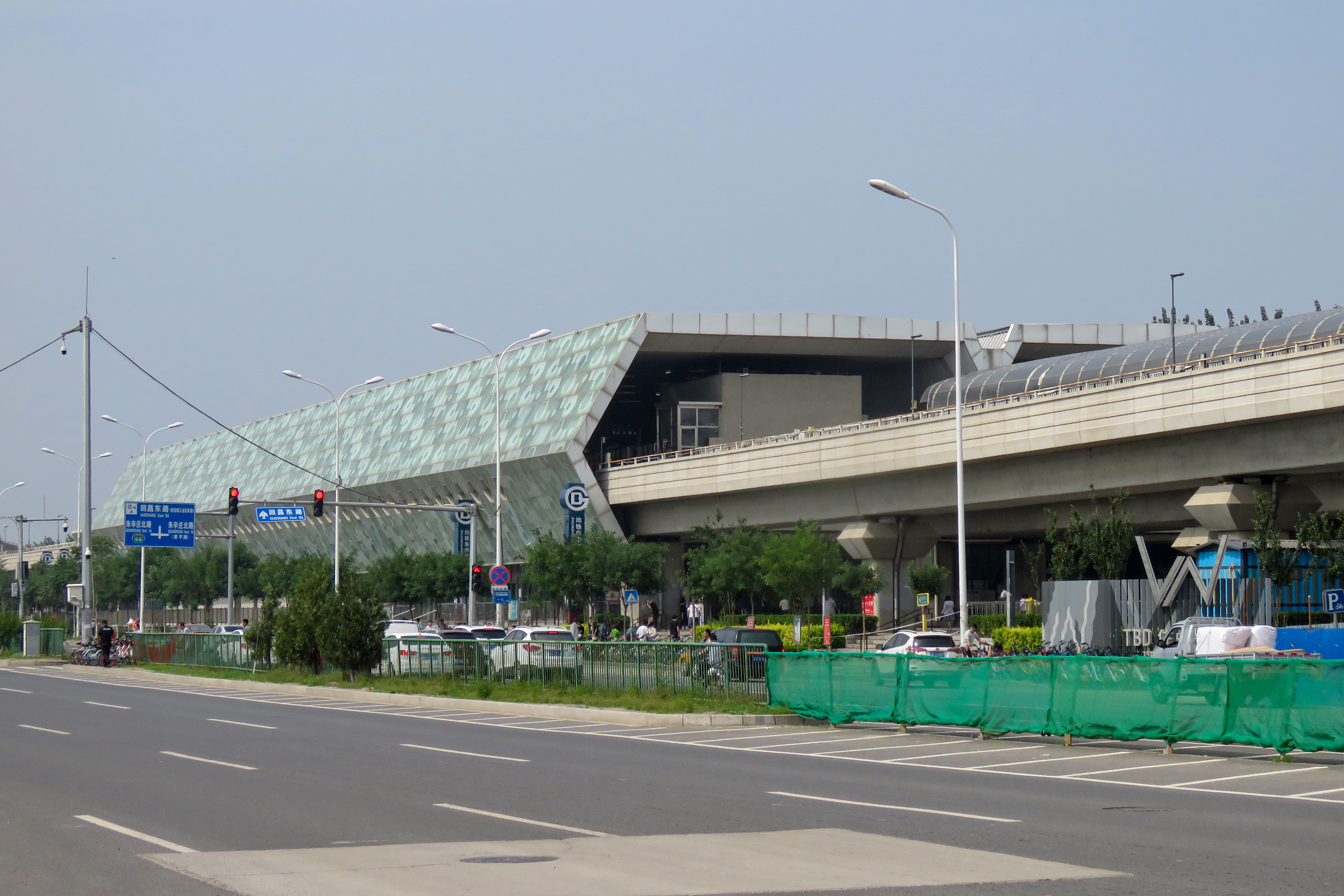
Exterior
