= Qinghe Xiaoyingqiao station =

Beijing Subway station

Qinghe Xiaoyingqiao 清河小营桥
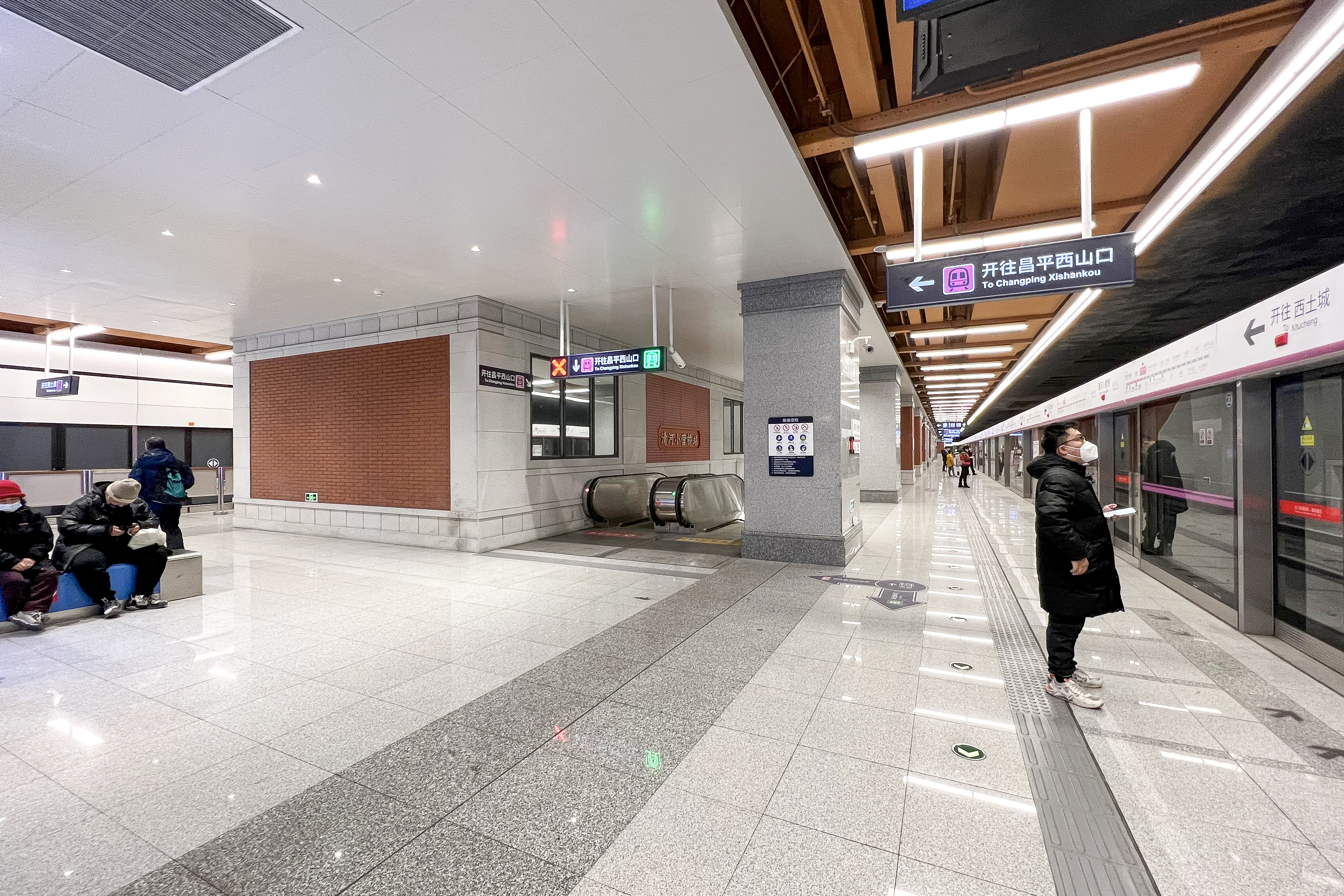
- Southbound platform (towards Xitucheng)

General information
- Location: Intersection of Jingzang Expressway (京藏高速) and Yongtaizhuang North Road (永泰庄北路); Qinghe Subdistrict, Haidian District, Beijing; China
- Coordinates: 40.033570°N 116.337041°E
- Operator: Beijing Mass Transit Railway Operation Corporation Limited
- Line: Changping line
- Platforms: 4 (2 island platforms)
- Tracks: 2

Construction
- Structure type: Underground
- Accessible: Yes

History
- Opened: February 4, 2023; 3 years ago

Services
Preceding station	Beijing Subway	Following station
Zhufangbei towards Changping Xishankou	Changping line	Xuezhiyuan towards Jimen Qiao
Location
- Location within Beijing

Qinghe Xiaoyingqiao station (Chinese: 清河小营桥站; pinyin: Qīnghé Xiǎoyíngqiáo zhàn) is a subway station on the Changping line of the Beijing Subway. It opened on February 4, 2023. The station is reserved for a potential cross-platform transfer with Line 19 in the future.

== History ==
On July 19, 2021, in the naming plan for the stations on the southern section of the Changping Line announced by the Beijing Municipal Commission of Planning and Natural Resources, the project name for this station was Xiaoyingqiao station. In June 2022, the station was officially named Qinghe Xiaoyingqiao station.

== Layout ==
The station has 2 underground island platforms. There are 7 exits, lettered A1, A2, B1, B2, B3, C and D. Exits B1, B2 and D are accessible via elevators.

== Station art ==
There are two murals on the wall of the paid area of the station hall, named 'Intertwined Dreams', which depict campuses and urban commercial buildings respectively, showing the scenes of contemporary youth studying and working; another wall in the station hall is decorated with the mural painting named 'Coloured Life', using coloured pencils as the design element.

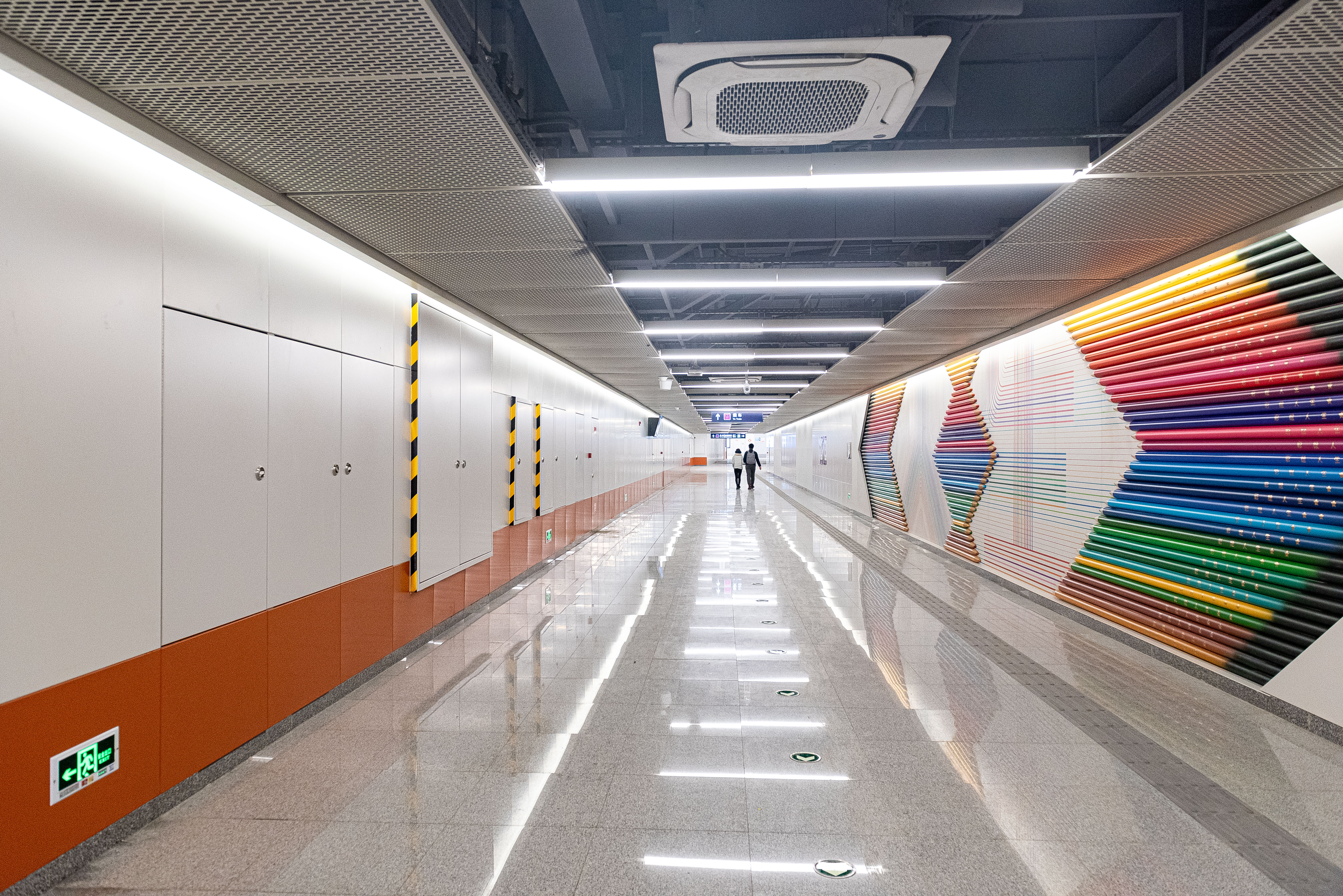
Exit B underpass passage with mural of 'Coloured Life'

== Gallery ==
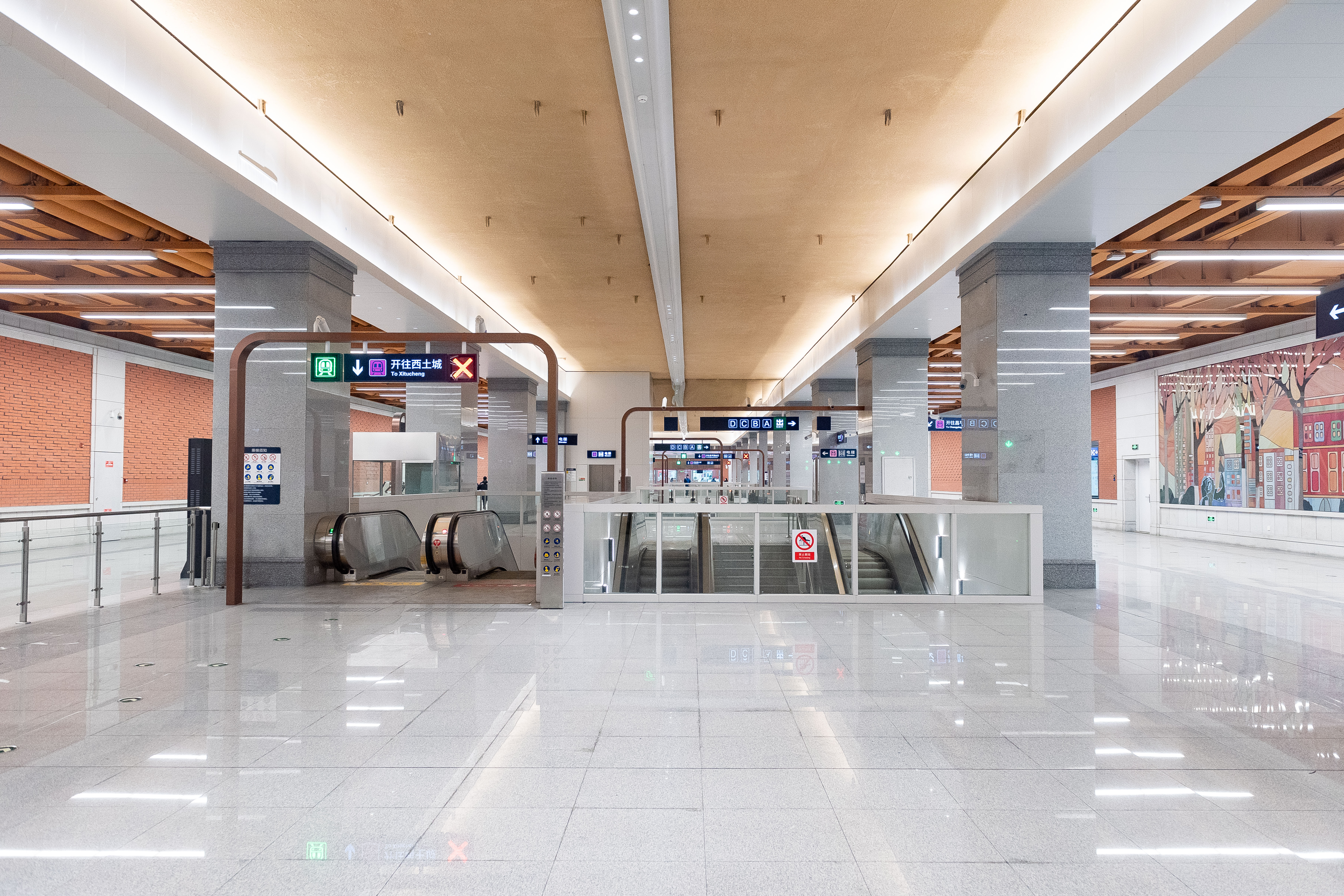
Concourse

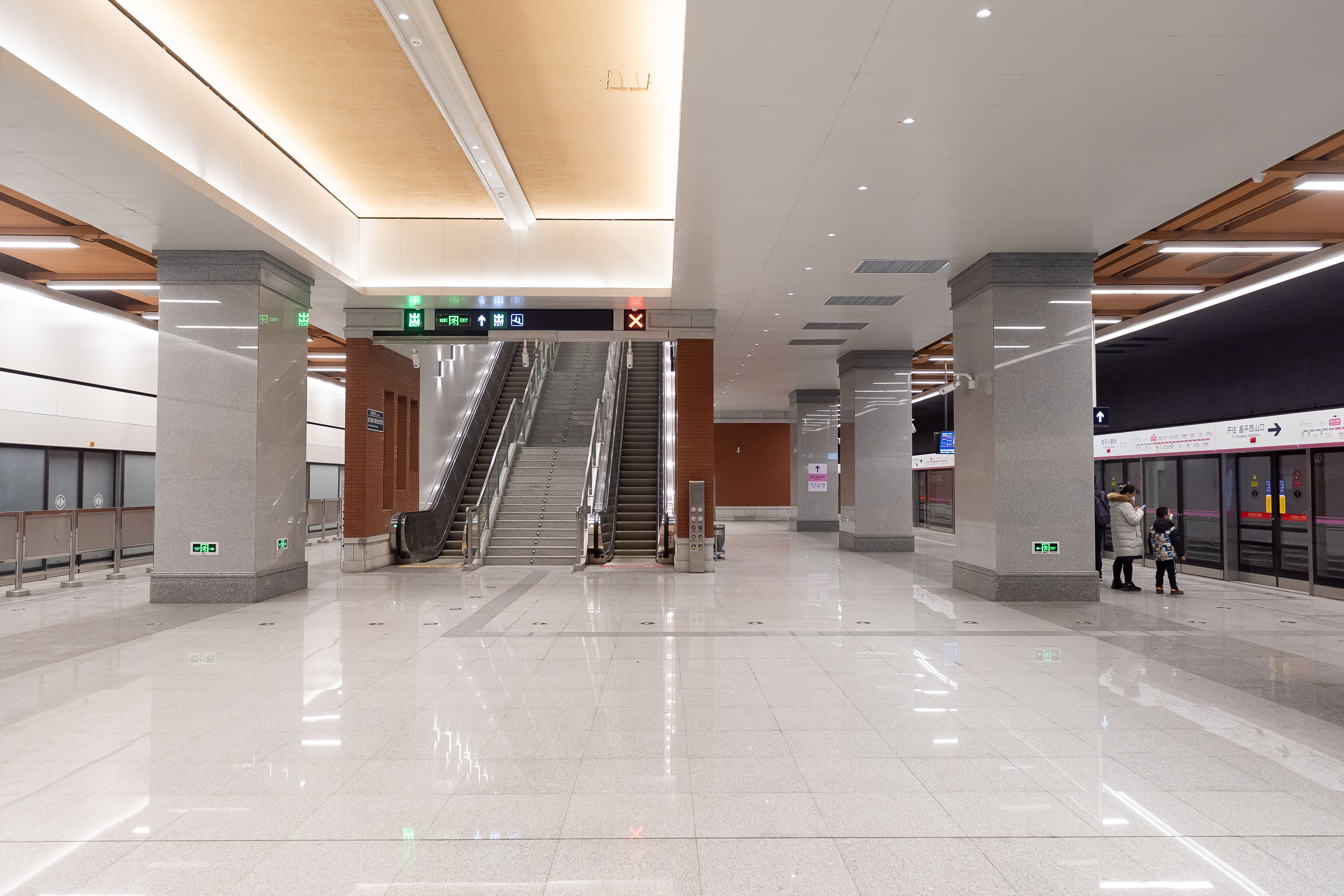
Northbound platform (towards Changping Xishankou)
