= Nanshao station =

Beijing Subway station

Nanshao 南邵
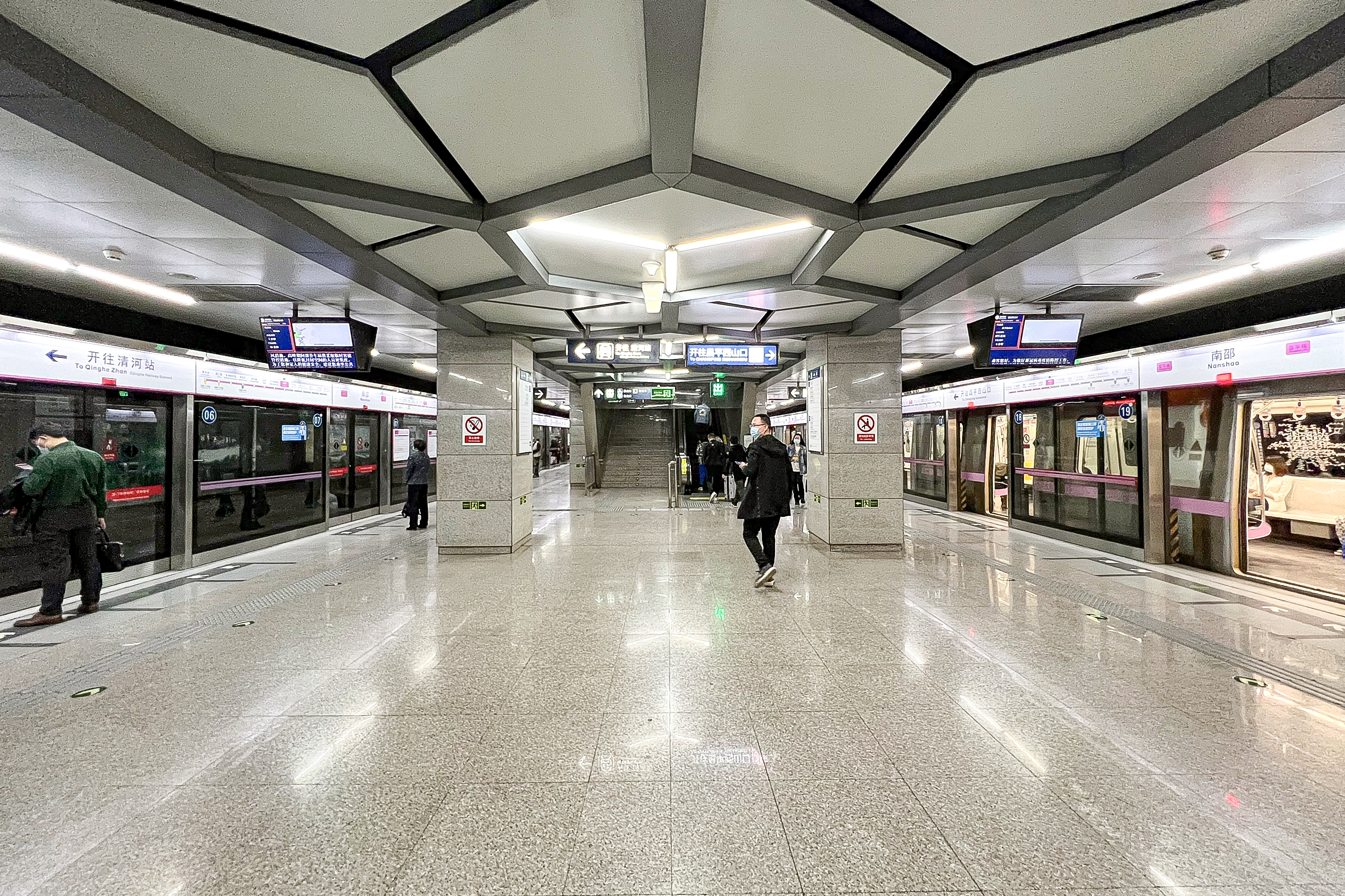
- Platform

General information
- Location: Nanshao, Changping District, Beijing; China
- Coordinates: 40°12′27″N 116°17′15″E
- Operator: Beijing Mass Transit Railway Operation Corporation Limited
- Line: Changping line
- Platforms: 2 (1 island platform)
- Tracks: 2

Construction
- Structure type: Underground
- Accessible: Yes

History
- Opened: December 30, 2010; 15 years ago

Services
Preceding station	Beijing Subway	Following station
Beishaowa towards Changping Xishankou	Changping line	Shahe Univ. Park towards Jimen Qiao
Location
- Location within Beijing

Nanshao station (Chinese: 南邵站; pinyin: Nánshào zhàn) is a station on the Changping Line of the Beijing Subway.

The station opened on December 30, 2010. The station was the northern terminus of the line until the extension to Changping Xishankou on December 26, 2015.

== Station layout ==
The station has an underground island platform.

== Exits ==
There are 5 exits, lettered A, B1, B2, C1, and C2. Exits A and C2 are wheelchair accessible.
