= Changping Dongguan station =

Beijing Subway station

Changping Dongguan 昌平东关
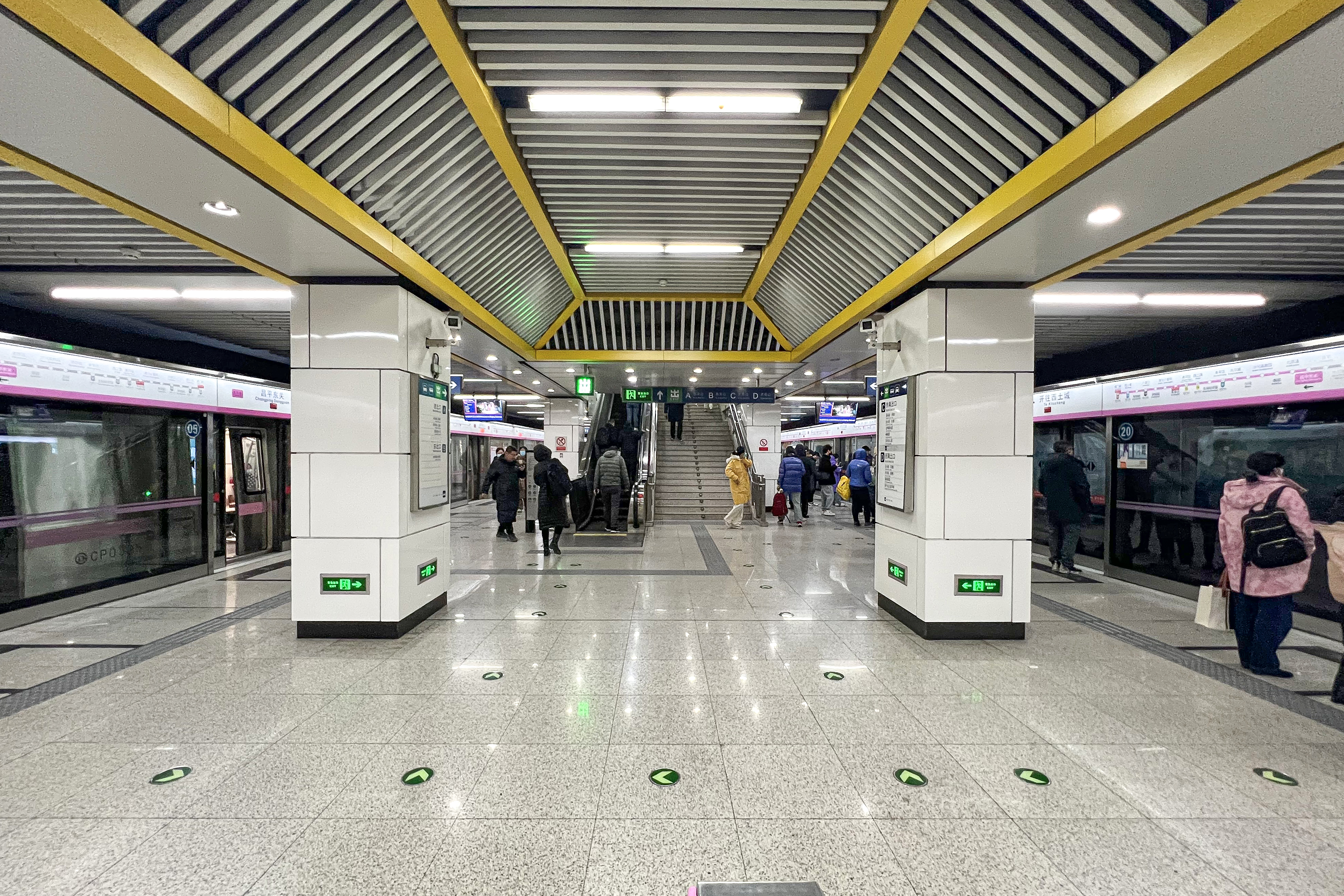
- Platform

General information
- Location: Fuxue Road (府学路) / Changcui Road (昌崔路) and Shuiku Road (水库路) / Shuilong Road (水龙路); Chengbei Subdistrict, Changping District, Beijing; China
- Coordinates: 40°13′18″N 116°15′43″E
- Operator: Beijing Mass Transit Railway Operation Corporation Limited
- Line: Changping line
- Platforms: 2 (1 island platform)
- Tracks: 2

Construction
- Structure type: Underground
- Accessible: Yes

History
- Opened: December 26, 2015; 10 years ago

Services
Preceding station	Beijing Subway	Following station
Changping towards Changping Xishankou	Changping line	Beishaowa towards Jimen Qiao
Location
- Location within Beijing

Changping Dongguan station (simplified Chinese: 昌平东关站; traditional Chinese: 昌平東關站; pinyin: Chāngpíng Dōngguān zhàn) is a station on the Changping Line of the Beijing Subway. It was opened on 26 December 2015.

== Station layout ==
The station has an underground island platform.

== Exits ==
There are 4 exits, lettered A, B, C, and D. Exits B and D are accessible.
