= Beishaowa station =

Beijing Subway station

Beishaowa 北邵洼
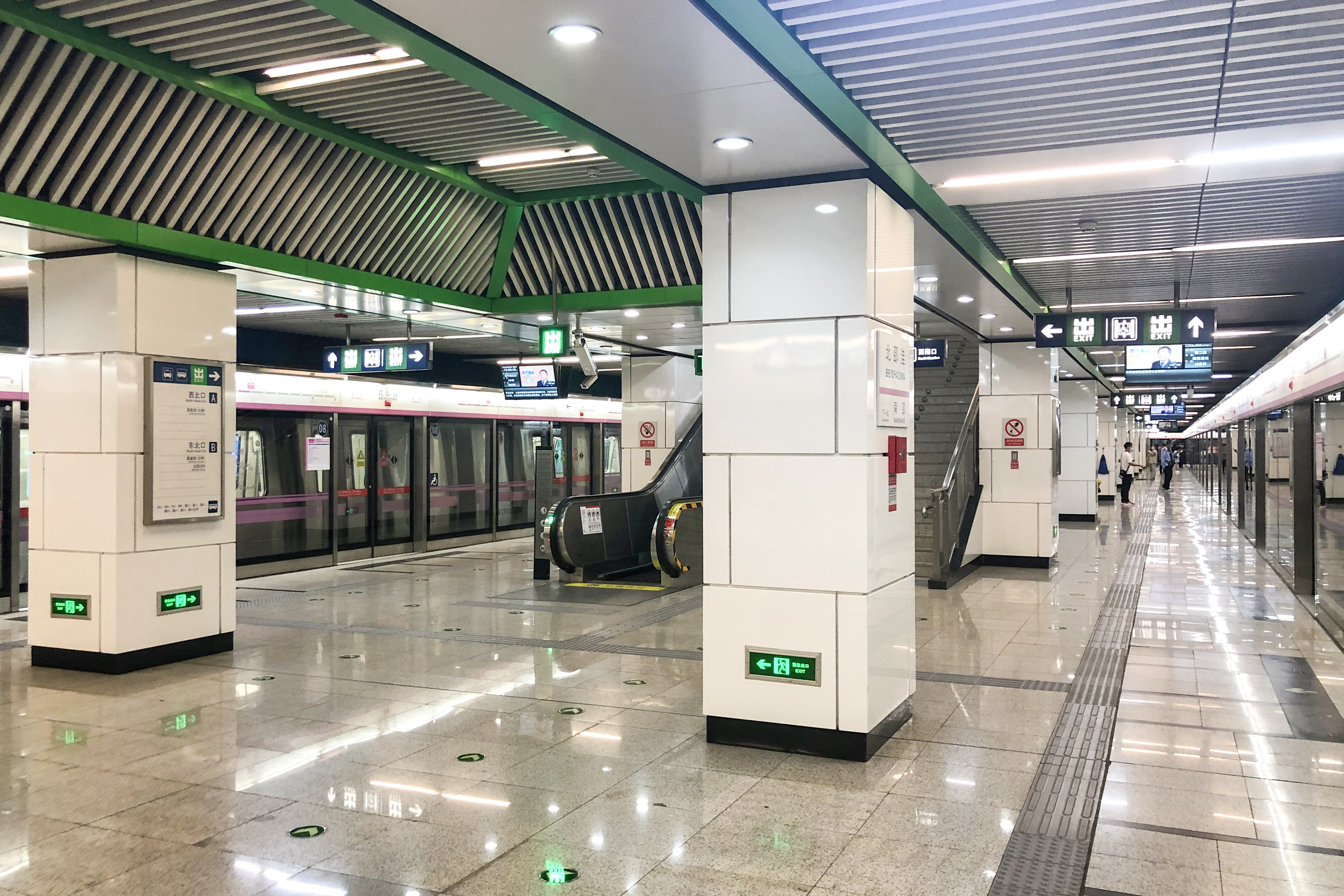
- Platform

General information
- Location: Changcui Road (昌崔路) and Neihuan West Road (内环西路); Nanshao, Changping District, Beijing; China
- Coordinates: 40°13′19″N 116°16′55″E
- Operator: Beijing Mass Transit Railway Operation Corp., Ltd
- Line: Changping line
- Platforms: 2 (1 island platform)
- Tracks: 2

Construction
- Structure type: Underground
- Accessible: yes

History
- Opened: December 26, 2015; 10 years ago

Services
Preceding station	Beijing Subway	Following station
Changping Dongguan towards Changping Xishankou	Changping line	Nanshao towards Jimen Qiao
Location
- Location within Beijing

Beishaowa station (Chinese: 北邵洼站; pinyin: Běishàowā zhàn) is a station on the Changping Line of the Beijing Subway. It was opened on 26 December 2015.

== Station layout ==
The station has an underground island platform.

== Exits ==
There are 4 exits, lettered A, B, C, and D. Exits B and C are accessible.
