= 2023 Beijing Subway collision =

Rail accident in China

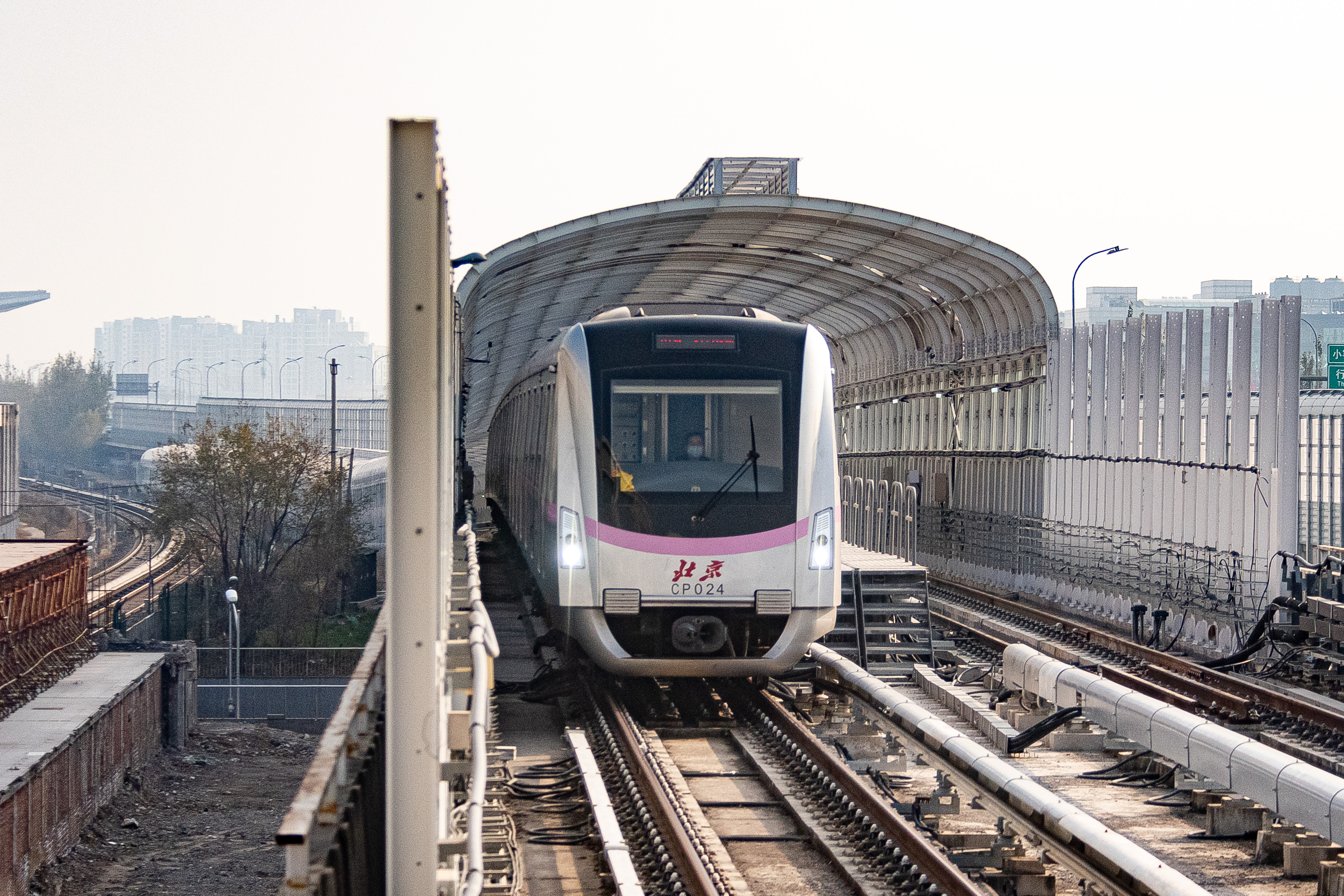
- CP024, one of the trains involved, seen in 2021

Details
- Date: 14 December 2023 about 19:00 CST (UTC+08:00)
- Location: Haidian, Beijing, China
- Country: China
- Line: Changping line
- Operator: Beijing Mass Transit Railway Operation Corporation Limited
- Owner: Beijing Subway
- Incident type: Collision

Statistics
- Trains: 2
- Deaths: 0
- Injured: at least 515
Diagram

On 14 December 2023, two trains on the Changping Line of the Beijing Subway in Beijing, China, collided in heavy snow, resulting in at least 515 injuries, but no fatalities. The tracks had become slippery, which caused the first train to automatically apply its brakes. The second train following behind failed to stop and crashed into the first.

== Background ==
The two trains involved in the collision were CSR Qingdao Sifang SFM13 trainsets, the first train being CP024 and the second CP032. They entered service in 2015.

There was heavy snow the day before the collision, which caused the temporary closure of some train lines and schools, and above-ground trains were instructed to be operated manually and to maintain a larger gap between trains. On the day of the accident, Beijing set an orange alert for heavy snow and a yellow alert for icy roads. Changping line on which the accident occurred transports approximately 400,000 people each weekday.

== Collision ==
The collision occurred during rush hour, at about 19:00 CST on the Changping line in Beijing. Another train, SFM93 set CP059, experienced skidding due to snowfall at Life Science Park station, the signalling system experienced a downgrade to manual, non-CBTC mode. As a result, CP024 stalled and waited in front of a signal behind CP059. CP032, which was manually driven, departed Xi'erqi station and at a speed of 92 kilometres per hour (57 mph). CP032 performed an emergency stop but failed to stop on the slippery track and hit CP024. A statement by the Beijing Municipal Commission of Transport indicated that the CP032 was travelling downhill and could not brake effectively. Beijing Subway later said that CP024 had become separated at several carriages, and the front two cars of CP032 involved in the collision had detached.

== Aftermath ==
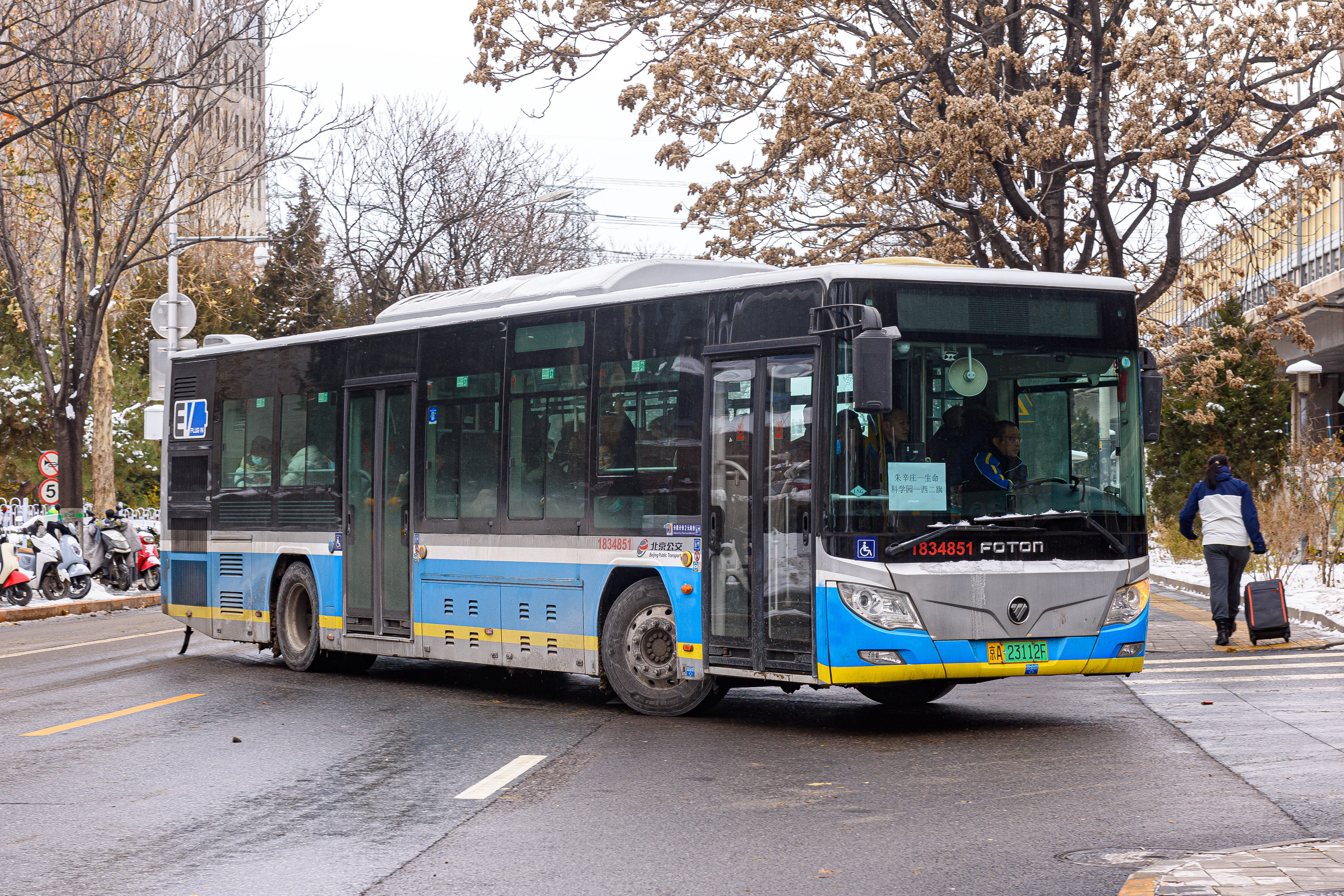
In the aftermath of the collision, shuttle buses were provided for the closed sectors.

The two trains involved lost power, leading to passengers being left in the dark and smashing windows open for fresh air. By 23:00, all passengers were evacuated by emergency services. More than 500 people were brought to hospitals, 102 of whom suffered bone fractures. As of 06:00 the next day, 423 had been released, 25 were under observation, and 67 others remained hospitalised. There were no fatalities.

Immediately after the accident, the Xi'erqi station was closed to facilitate rescue operations. Rail services on the Changping Line between Xi'erqi and Zhuxinzhuang stations were also suspended due to the damaged trains blocking the track. On 15 December, the Changping line continued to operate without service between Xi'erqi and Zhuxinzhuang stations, with replacement shuttle bus services provided for the closed section.

Following the collision, Beijing Subway offered an apology and said that it would pay for passengers' medical costs. Passengers who had already left the scene but experienced discomfort later were also welcomed to contact Beijing Subway.

The incident had also sparked criticism from netizens, with one Weibo user questioning the maintenance of the network and asked whether Beijing Subway was "taking the lives of hundreds of people too lightly".

On 16 December, full services on the Changping Line resumed. 12 cars (CP0241-CP0246 and CP0321-CP0326) were placed in storage at Dingsilu Yard since at least 5 February 2024.
