= Gonghua Cheng station =

Beijing Subway station

Gonghua Cheng 巩华城
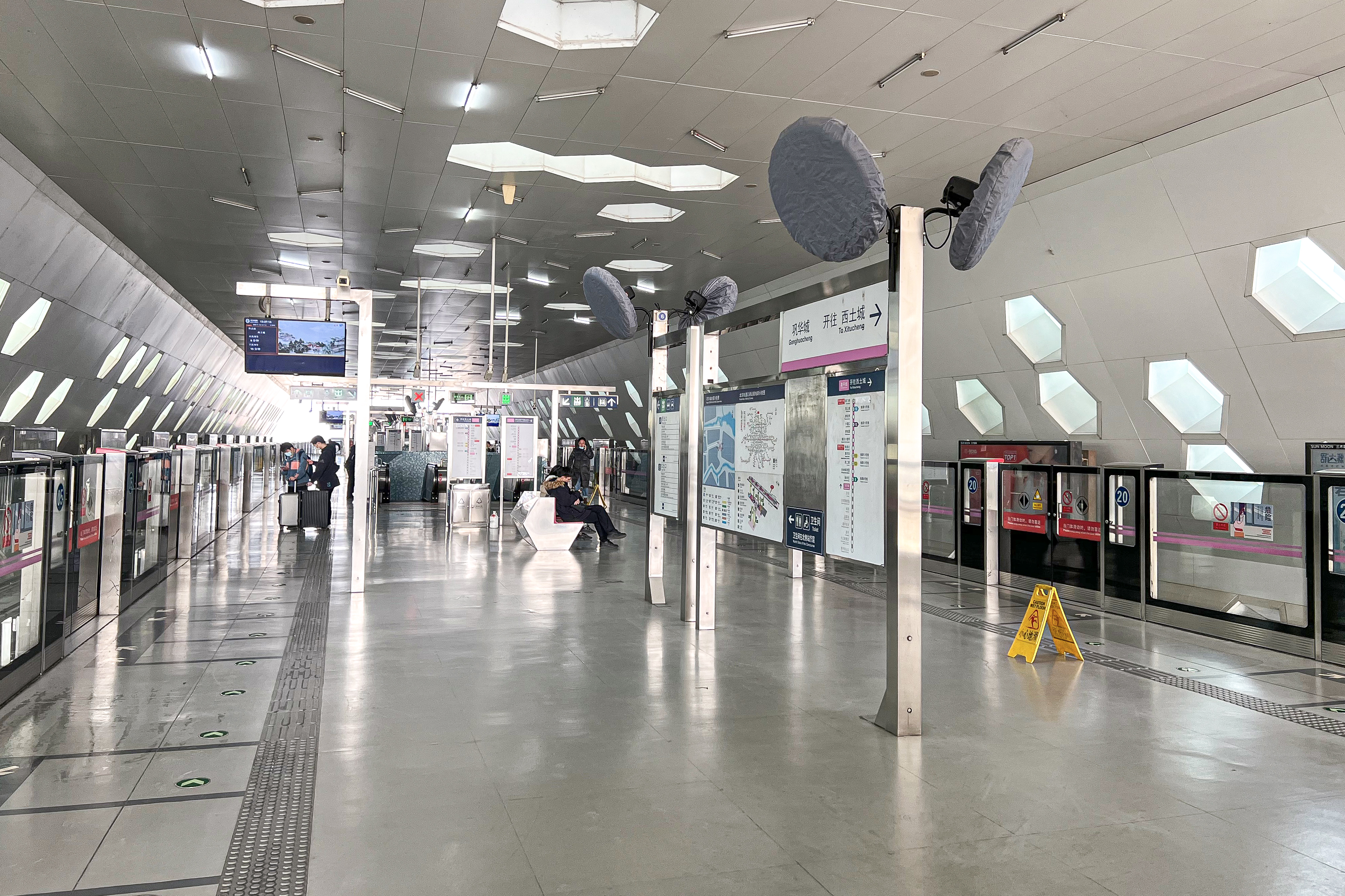
- Platform

General information
- Location: Shahe, Changping District, Beijing; China
- Coordinates: 40°07′51″N 116°17′37″E
- Operator: Beijing Mass Transit Railway Operation Corporation Limited
- Line: Changping line
- Platforms: 2 (1 island platform)
- Tracks: 2

Construction
- Structure type: Elevated
- Accessible: Yes

History
- Opened: December 30, 2010; 15 years ago

Services
Preceding station	Beijing Subway	Following station
Shahe towards Changping Xishankou	Changping line	Zhuxinzhuang towards Jimen Qiao
Location
- Location within Beijing

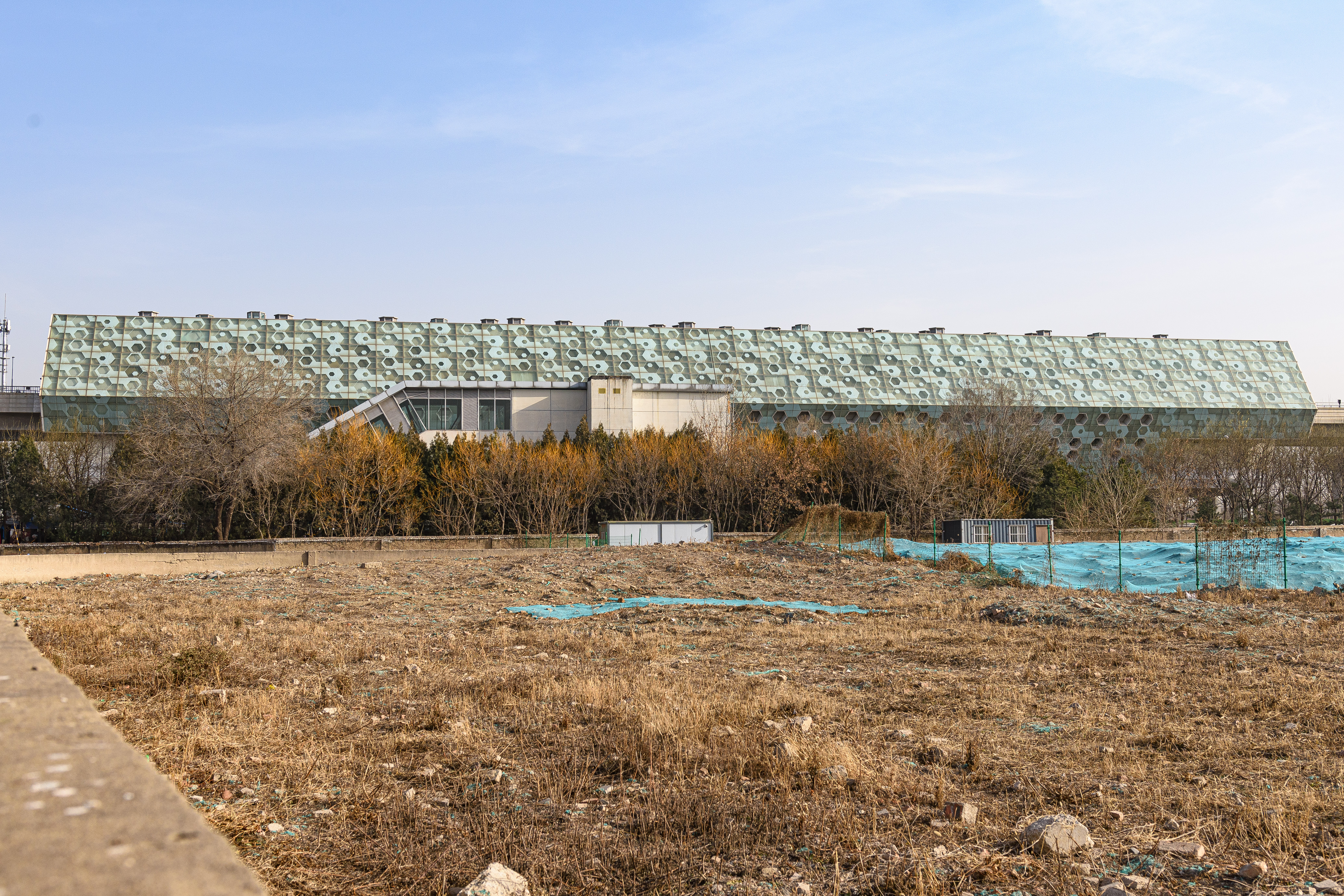
Exterior

Gonghua Cheng station (simplified Chinese: 巩华城站; traditional Chinese: 鞏華城站; pinyin: Gǒnghuáchéng zhàn) is a station on the Changping Line of the Beijing Subway, located in Changping District to the west of the Shahe Reservoir (沙河水库).

== Station layout ==
The station has an elevated island platform.

== Exits ==
There are 4 exits, lettered A1, A2, B1, and B2. Exits A1 and B2 are accessible.
