= Shahe station (Beijing Subway) =

Beijing Subway station

Shahe 沙河
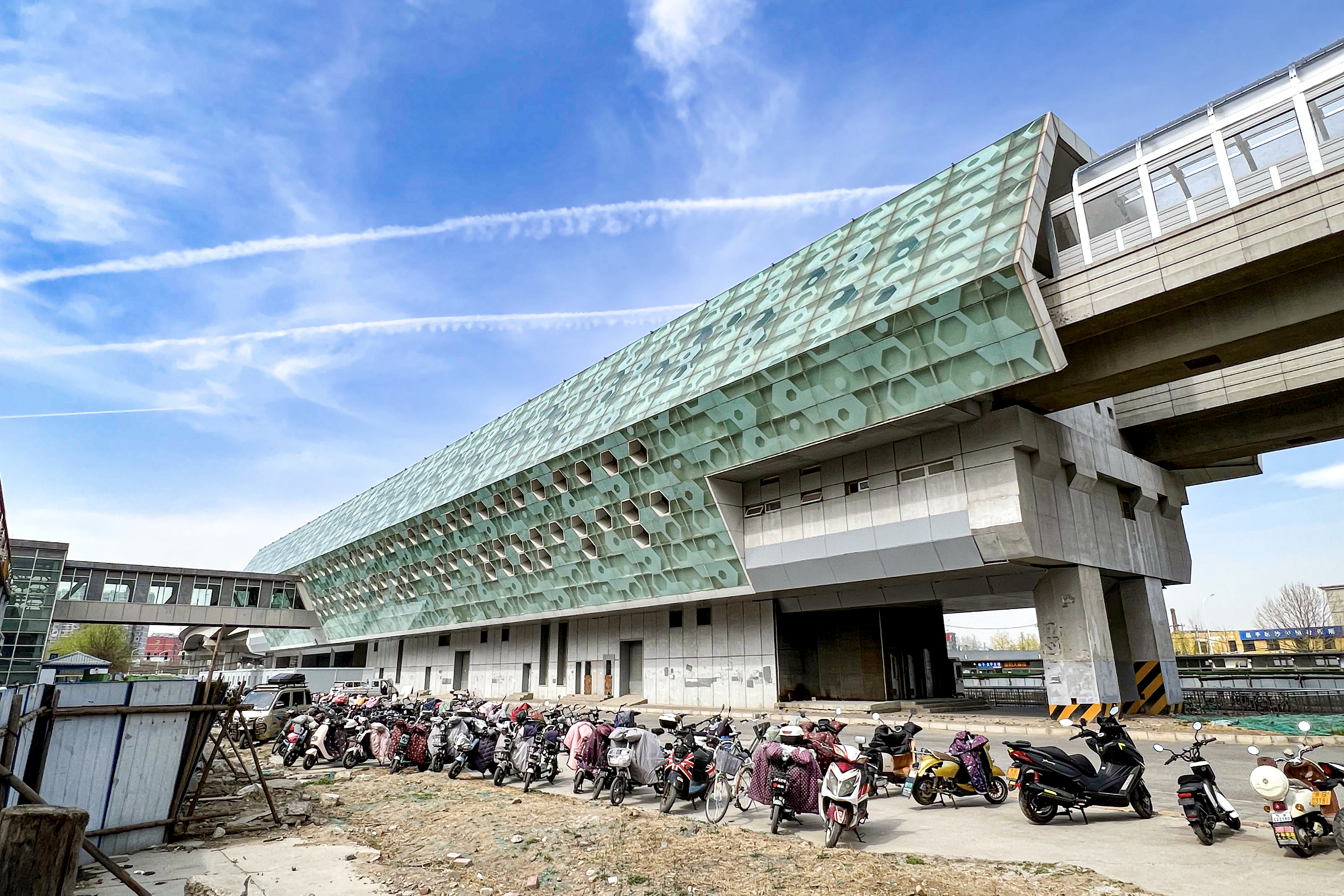
- Exterior

General information
- Location: Shahe, Changping District, Beijing; China
- Coordinates: 40°08′54″N 116°17′20″E
- Operator: Beijing Mass Transit Railway Operation Corporation Limited
- Line: Changping line
- Platforms: 2 (1 island platform)
- Tracks: 2

Construction
- Structure type: Elevated
- Accessible: Yes

History
- Opened: December 30, 2010; 15 years ago

Services
Preceding station	Beijing Subway	Following station
Shahe Univ. Park towards Changping Xishankou	Changping line	Gonghua Cheng towards Jimen Qiao
Location
- Location within Beijing

Shahe station (Chinese: 沙河站; pinyin: Shāhé zhàn) is a station on the Changping Line of the Beijing Subway. The station was opened on December 30, 2010.

== Location ==
The station is located in Shahe Area, Changping District, Beijing. It is on the south side of the T junction of Baisha Road and Nanfeng Road.

== Station layout ==
The station has an elevated island platform.

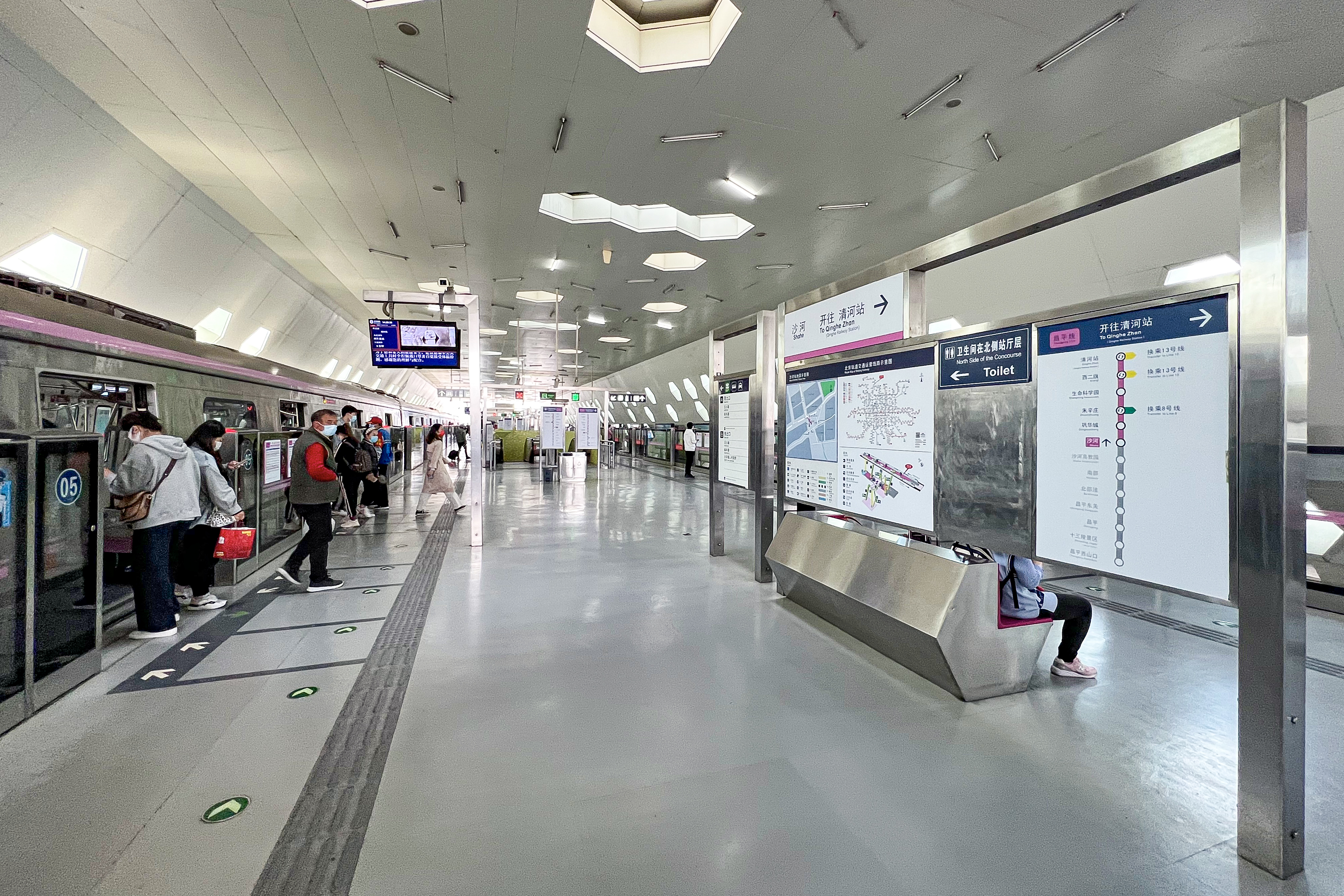
Platforms

== Exits ==
The station has 4 exits, lettered A1, A2, B1, and B2. Exits A1 and B2 are accessible.
