= Shahe Univ. Park station =

Beijing Subway station

Shahe Univ. Park 沙河高教园
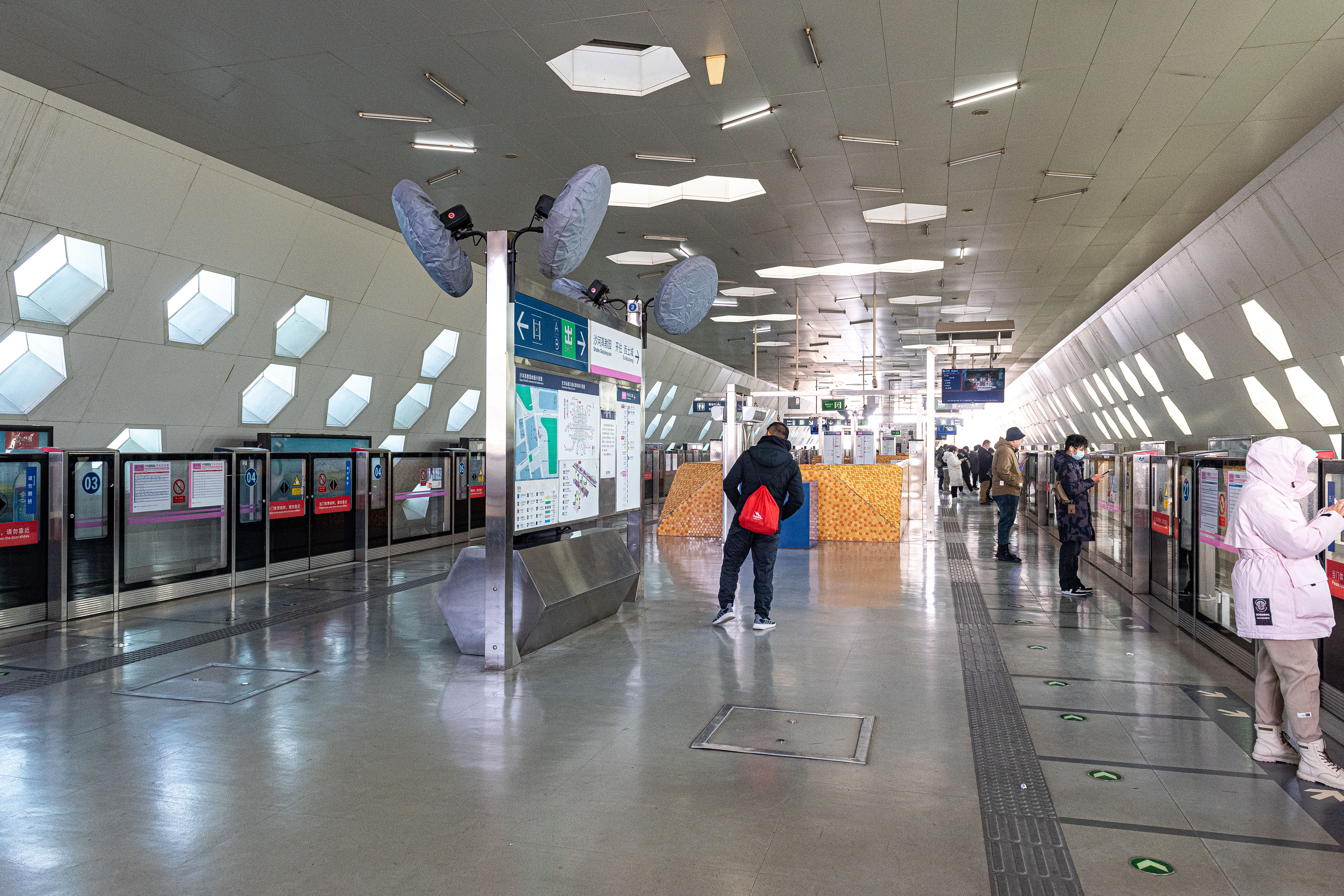
- Platform

General information
- Location: Nanfeng Road (南丰路) south of Shunsha Road (顺沙路); Shahe, Changping District, Beijing; China
- Coordinates: 40°09′53″N 116°16′50″E
- Operator: Beijing Mass Transit Railway Operation Corporation Limited
- Line: Changping line
- Platforms: 2 (1 island platform)
- Tracks: 2

Construction
- Structure type: Elevated
- Accessible: Yes

History
- Opened: December 30, 2010; 15 years ago

Services
Preceding station	Beijing Subway	Following station
Nanshao towards Changping Xishankou	Changping line	Shahe towards Jimen Qiao
Location
- Location within Beijing

Shahe Univ. Park station (simplified Chinese: 沙河高教园站; traditional Chinese: 沙河高教園站; pinyin: Shāhé Gāojiàoyuán zhàn) is a station on the Changping Line of the Beijing Subway.

== Station layout ==
The station has an elevated island platform.

== Exits ==
There are 4 exits, lettered A1, A2, B1, and B2. Exits A1 and B2 are accessible.
