= Life Science Park station =

Beijing Subway station

Life Science Park 生命科学园
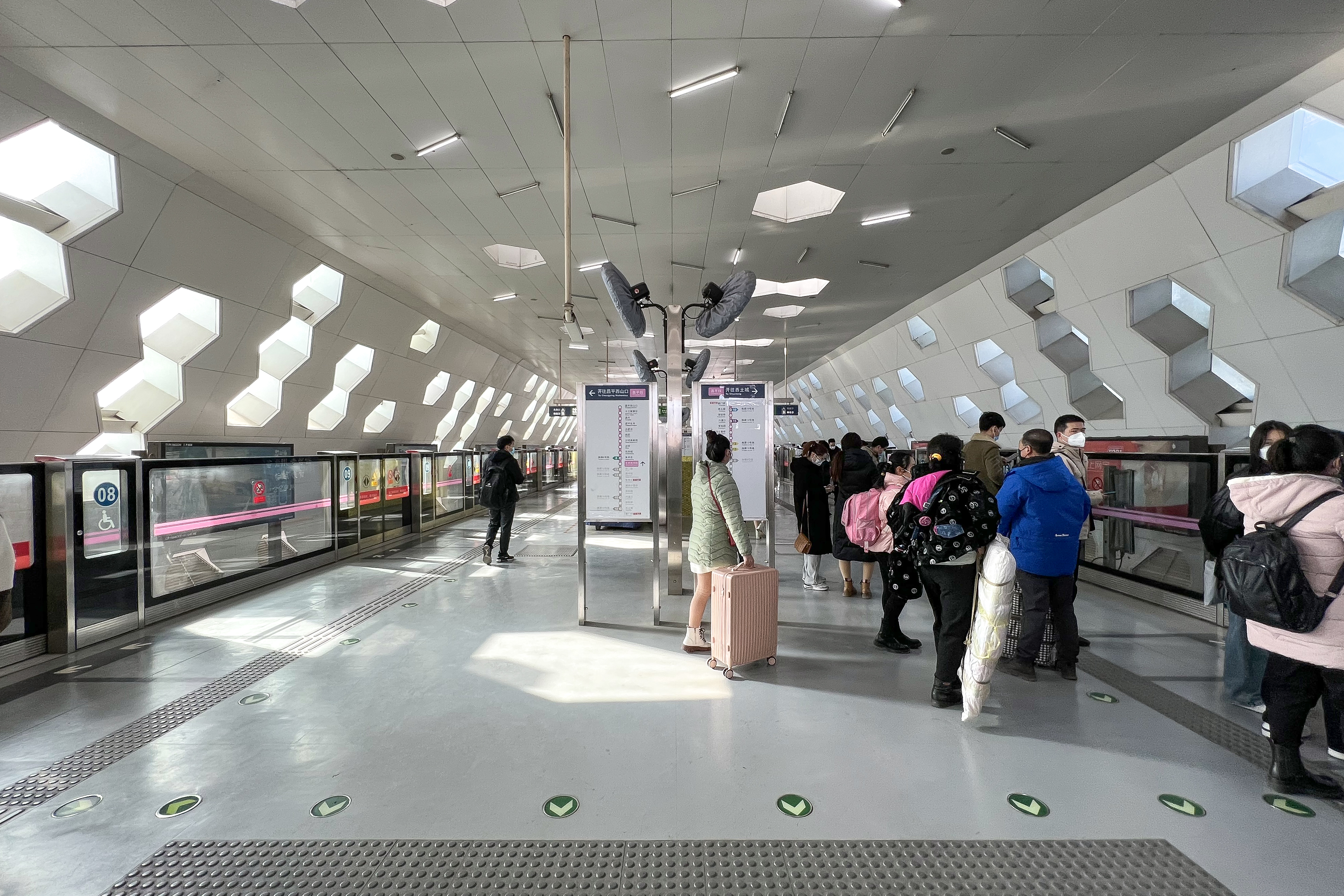
- Platform

General information
- Location: Beiqing Road (北清路) west of G6 Beijing–Lhasa Expressway; Shigezhuang Subdistrict, Changping District, Beijing; China
- Coordinates: 40°05′41″N 116°17′39″E
- Operator: Beijing Mass Transit Railway Operation Corporation Limited
- Line: Changping line
- Platforms: 2 (1 island platform)
- Tracks: 2

Construction
- Structure type: Elevated
- Accessible: Yes

History
- Opened: December 30, 2010; 15 years ago

Services
Preceding station	Beijing Subway	Following station
Zhuxinzhuang towards Changping Xishankou	Changping line	Xi'erqi towards Jimen Qiao
Location
- Location within Beijing

Life Science Park station (simplified Chinese: 生命科学园站; traditional Chinese: 生命科學園站; pinyin: Shēngmìng Kēxué Yuán zhàn) is a station on the Changping Line of the Beijing Subway.

== Station layout ==
The station has an elevated island platform.

== Exits ==
There are 2 exits, lettered A and B. Exit B is accessible.
