= Changping line =

Rapid transit line in Beijing

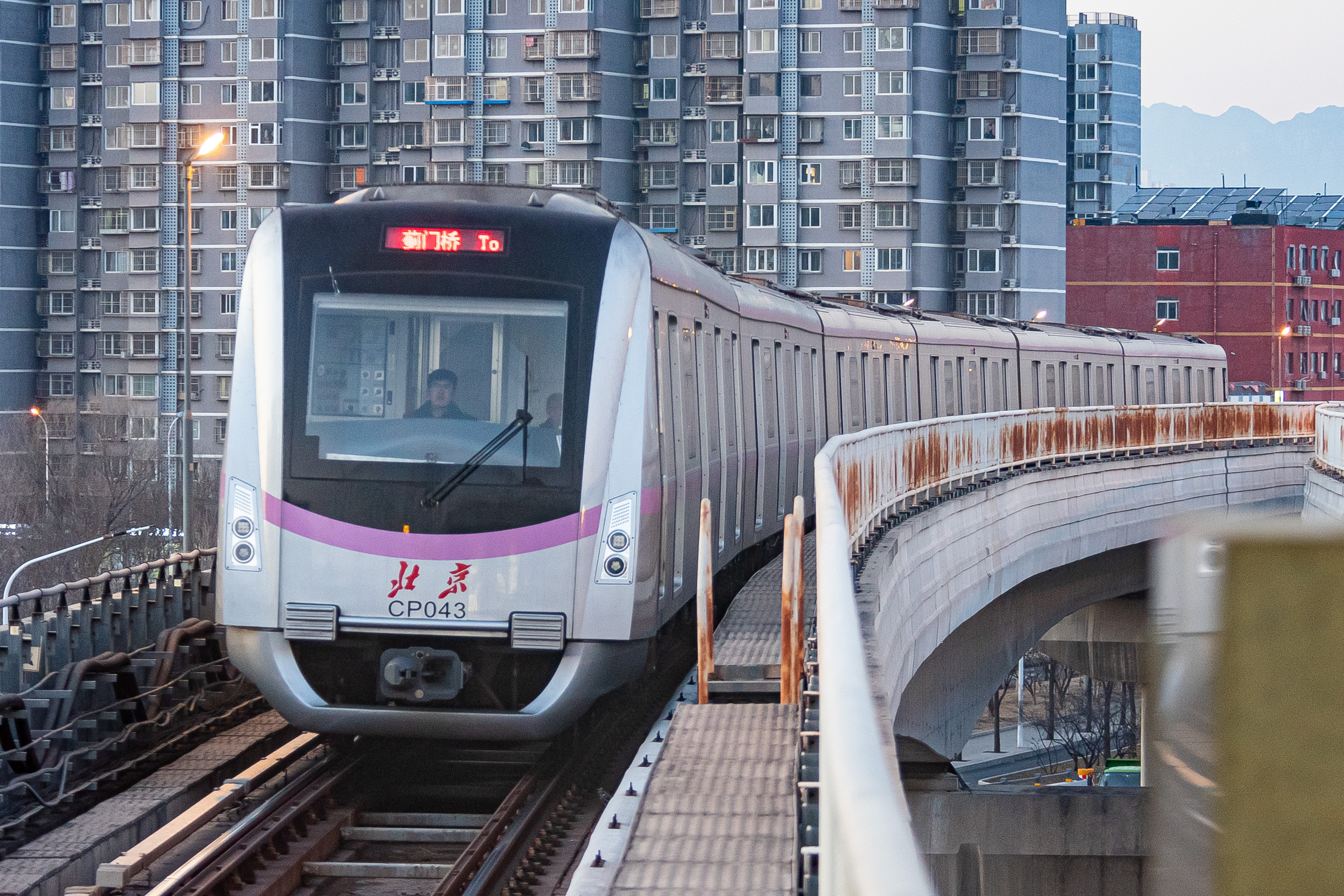
- A train entering Shahe station in Changping

Overview
- Other name(s): Line 27; M27 (planned name)
- Native name: 昌平线
- Status: Operational
- Locale: Haidian and Changping districts Beijing
- Termini: Changping Xishankou; Jimen Qiao
- Stations: 20

Service
- Type: Rapid transit
- System: Beijing Subway
- Operator(s): Beijing Mass Transit Railway Operation Corp., Ltd
- Depot(s): Dingsilu, Shisanling Jingqu
- Rolling stock: 6-car Type B (SFM13)
- Daily ridership: 157,100 (2014 Avg.); 238,000 (2016 Peak)

History
- Opened: December 30, 2010; 15 years ago

Technical
- Line length: 43.8 km (27.2 mi)
- Character: underground and elevated
- Track gauge: 1,435 mm (4 ft 8 1/2 in)
- Operating speed: 100 km/h (62 mph) (maximum service speed)

The Changping line (Chinese: 昌平线; pinyin: chāngpíng xiàn) is a rapid transit line of the Beijing Subway, served in northern Beijing. It is 43.8 km (27.2 mi) in length with 20 stations. Changping line's color is pink on official maps, signage, and station branding.

== Route ==
The Changping Line runs parallel to, and to the east of, the Badaling Expressway, passing near Shahe and Nanshao.

=== South extension (section 1) to Jimen Qiao ===
The southern extension to Jimen Qiao station is 12.6 km (7.8 mi) in length, including a 0.36 km (0.22 mi) elevated section and a 12.24 km (7.61 mi) underground section. The extension will add 8 underground stations to the line. The one-station extension to Qinghe railway station opened on December 31, 2021, and the section between Qinghe railway station and Xitucheng opened on February 4, 2023, with 5 new stations. The rest of south extension, include Zhufangbei and Jimen Qiao stations (interchange to Line 12) opened on December 15, 2024.

== Stations (North to South) ==
Service Routes:

- Regular: Changping Xishankou – Jimen Qiao
- Short rush hour: Shahe Univ. Park – Jimen Qiao
- Middle rush hour: Changping Dongguan – Jimen Qiao, with Beishaowa bypassed in the morning (○)
- Long rush hour (▲△): Jimen Qiao → Changping Xishankou, with some trains bypassing Gonghuacheng; only available in the morning
- Some trains before or after rush hours, and near the last train: Jimen Qiao → Zhuxinzhuang, then return to the Dingsilu Depot

Service Route					Station Name		Connections	Nearby Bus Stops	Distance km		Location
Service Route					English	Chinese	Connections	Nearby Bus Stops	Distance km		Location
●			▲		Changping Xishankou	昌平西山口		949 昌53 昌68 昌69 昌78 C117	0.000	0.000	Changping
●			▲		Ming Tombs	十三陵景区		949 昌53 昌78	1.213	1.213	Changping
●			▲		Changping	昌平		326 345 345快 376 559 655 870 昌11 昌11支 昌13 昌21 昌21支 昌36 昌52 昌55 昌55支 昌56 昌57 昌57区 昌57支 昌59 昌63 昌66 昌67 C104 H54 专105 专106	3.508	4.721	Changping
●		●	▲		Changping Dongguan	昌平东关		326 345快 357 376 493 590 643 655 870 886 889 922 949 962 昌1 昌2 昌3 昌11 昌11支 昌13 昌16 昌21 昌21支 昌28 昌31 昌31区 昌32 昌32区 昌36 昌37 昌50 昌51 昌51区 昌51支 昌59 昌63 昌65 昌68 C104 C111 快速直达专线12 快速直达专线37 快速直达专线124 H54 专105 专106	2.433	7.154	Changping
●		○	▲		Beishaowa	北邵洼		885 889 962 昌11 昌11支 昌21 昌21支 昌28 昌31 昌31区 昌32 昌32区 昌37 昌50 昌51 昌51区 昌51支 昌59 昌63 昌76 C111 H54	1.683	8.837	Changping
●		●	▲		Nanshao	南邵		326 643 870 昌3 昌11 昌11支 昌28 昌31 昌31区 昌32 昌32区 昌50 昌51 昌51区 昌51支 昌59 昌76 昌77 C104 C111	1.958	10.795	Changping
●	●	●	▲		Shahe Univ. Park	沙河高教园		643 昌52 昌58支 C104 C125 快速直达专线87 专73 专74 专135	5.357	16.152	Changping
●	●	●	▲		Shahe	沙河		670 945 昌19 昌52 昌58支 昌66 C116 C126 C127 快速直达专线125 快速直达专线126 快速直达专线127 快速直达专线134 专70 专95 专135	1.964	18.116	Changping
●	●	●	△		Gonghua Cheng	巩华城		专66	2.025	20.141	Changping
●	●	●	▲	▲	Zhuxinzhuang	朱辛庄	8	417 463 560 871 880 880专 898 899 昌19 昌73 C122 C124 快速直达专线27 专49	3.799	23.940	Changping
●	●	●	▲	▲	Life Science Park	生命科学园		417 495 543 560 608 617 871 878 932 快速直达专线29 快速直达专线32 快速直达专线153 快速直达专线202 快速直达专线203 专134	2.367	26.307	Changping
●	●	●	▲	▲	Xi'erqi	西二旗	13	333 362 367 509 608 636 902 932 963 通医专线11 专128	5.440	31.747	Haidian
●	●	●	▲	▲	Qinghe railway station	清河站	13 Huairou–Miyun; QIP	320 333 495 603 623 夜4 专29 专139	1.546	33.293	Haidian
●	●	●	▲	▲	Zhufangbei	朱房北		328 333 392 393 432 476 518 577 614 618 632 688 快速直达专线178 夜4 专60	1.652	34.945	Haidian
●	●	●	▲	▲	Qinghe Xiaoyingqiao	清河小营桥		307 328 345 355 392 398 407 490 518 606 607 609 618 625 632 693 889 快速直达专线178 夜4 夜38 专89	1.158	36.103	Haidian
●	●	●	▲	▲	Xuezhiyuan	学知园		355 392 398 490 603 606 632 693 夜4	2.366	38.469	Haidian
●	●	●	▲	▲	Liudao Kou	六道口	15	26 355 398 438 450 478 490 577 603 606 632 693 夜4 专12	1.683	40.152	Haidian
●	●	●	▲	▲	Xueyuanqiao	学院桥		26 319 331 375 386 400 400快 478 484 490 603 606 609 613 632 686 693 928 观光3 快速直达专线67 快速直达专线126 快速直达专线127 快速直达专线147 夜4	1.312	41.464	Haidian
●	●	●	▲	▲	Xitucheng	西土城	10	21 94 375 386 478 579 601 603 653 658 671 686 693 专32	1.481	42.945	Haidian
●	●	●	▲	▲	Jimen Qiao	蓟门桥	12	16 21 87 88 94 300 302 315 361 368 375 387 425 603 606 632 658 671 686 693 695 921 夜30 专168	0.808	43.753	Haidian

== Opening timeline ==
The line started construction in 2009. In September 2010, construction of Phase I was completed, and was followed by a three-month test run. Phase I of the line opened on December 30, 2010, and ran north from the Xi'erqi station on Line 13 to Nanshao station. It connects the central Changping District with the Beijing subway network.

On December 26, 2015, Phase II of the line opened, extending the line northwards to the Ming Tombs Scenic Area and terminating at Changping Xishankou station.

On December 31, 2021, the one-station extension to Qinghe railway station opened.

On February 4, 2023, the extension to Xitucheng opened. (Zhufangbei station was not opened)

On December 15, 2024, Zhufangbei and another one-station extension to Jimen Qiao opened.

Segment	Commencement	Length	Station(s)	Name
Nanshao — Xi'erqi	30 December 2010	21.3 km (13.2 mi)	7	Phase 1
Changping Xishankou — Nanshao	26 December 2015	10.6 km (6.6 mi)	5	Phase 2
Xi'erqi — Qinghe Railway Station	31 December 2021	1.5 km (0.93 mi)	1	South extension
Qinghe Railway Station — Xitucheng	4 February 2023	9.7 km (6.0 mi)	5	South extension
Xitucheng — Jimen Qiao	15 December 2024	0.7 km (0.43 mi)	1	South extension
Zhufangbei	15 December 2024	Infill station	1	South extension

== Future development ==
=== Through service with Line 8 ===
Through service between Line 8 and Changping line via Zhuxinzhuang station is under planning.

=== South extension (section 2) to Xueyuannanlu ===
A further southern extension to Xueyuannanlu is planned. It will interchange with Line 9 and Line 13A at Xueyuannanlu station (formerly known as Mingguangqiaoxi station). This extension is still under planning and construction has not started.

== History ==
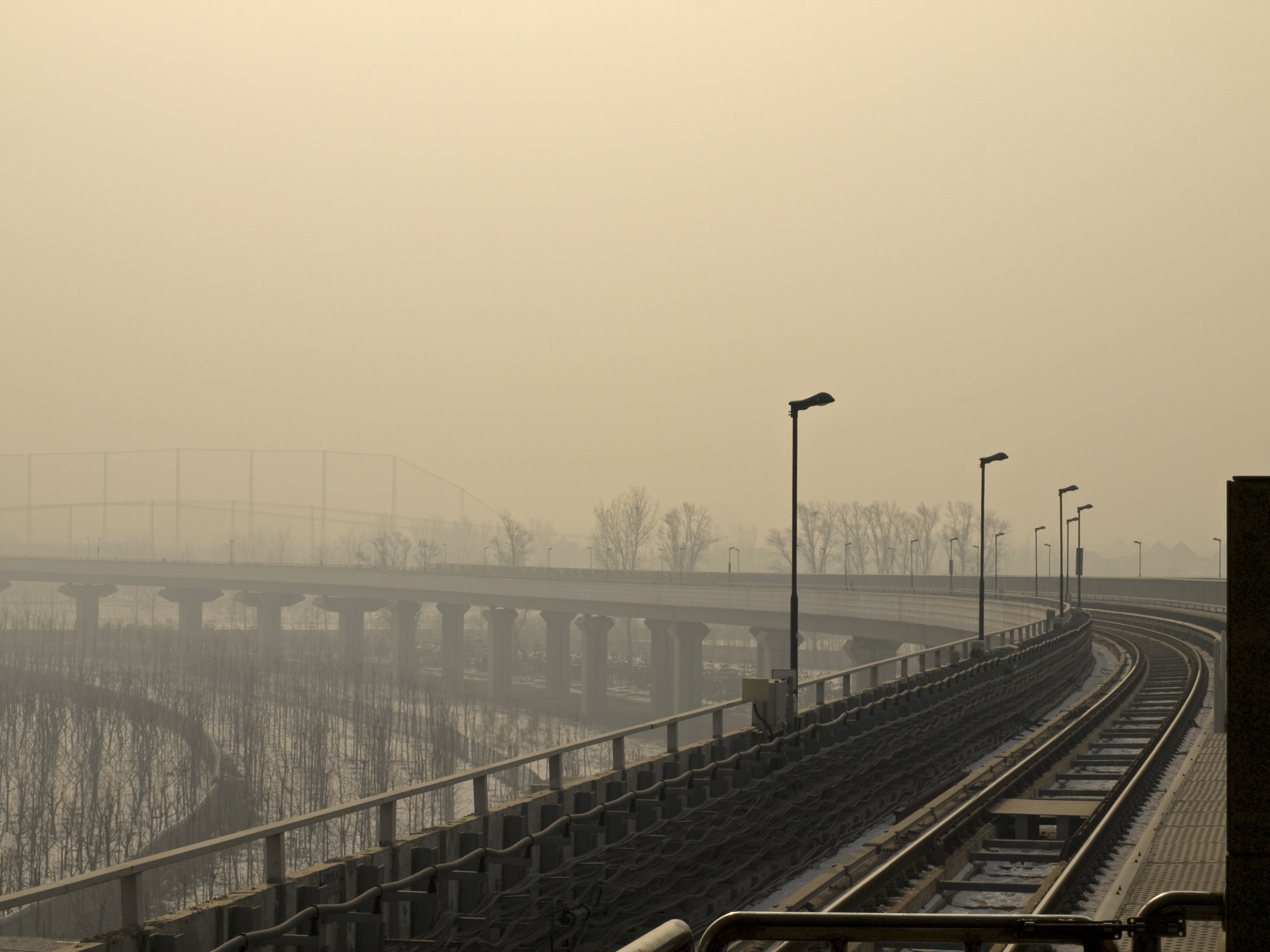
The stretch of Changping line, south of Gonghuacheng station.

The planned route of the Changping Line was chosen from three alternatives. The other original options placed the southern terminus of the line at the Beijing North railway station, near Line 2 at Xizhimen, or at Huoying, with transfers to Line 8 and Line 13. One original alternative plan set Phase II at 16.7 km (10.4 mi), with one extra station beyond the Ming Tombs.

On January 5, 2009, the Changping District government signed land clearing contracts with townships along routes through Huilongguan, Shahe, and Nanshao, marking the official beginning of Phase I construction. Phase I was set to be completed by the end of 2010, and Phase II was scheduled for completion by 2012.

On September 19, 2010, the line commenced trial running with empty cars.

On December 30, 2010, Phase I of the line entered into operation.

On December 26, 2015, Phase II of the line entered into operation, extending the line north underground for another 5 stations.

On December 31, 2021, a one-station extension to Qinghe railway station opened.

On February 4, 2023, the extension to Xitucheng opened.

On December 15, 2024, Zhufangbei and another one-station extension to Jimen Qiao opened.

== Ridership ==
During rush hours, in 2013, the section between Life Science Park and Xi'erqi Stations was the most congested section in Beijing Subway, operating at 132% capacity.

== Accident ==
On December 14, 2023, two Changping line trains collided between Xi'erqi station and Life Science Park station, causing one of the carriages to break apart. At least 515 people on board were injured. The service between Xi'erqi and Zhuxinzhuang station was suspended due to the accident. On December 16, the full service on Changping line resumed.

On July 25, 2024, an out-of-service SFM93 train (set CP064) partially derailed on the siding of Qinghe railway station. Car CP0641's second bogie was derailed, causing service suspension between Xi'erqi station and Xuezhiyuan station section for five hours.

== Rolling stock ==
Model	Image	Manufacturer	Year built	Amount in service	Fleet numbers	Depot	Notes
SFM13		CRRC Qingdao Sifang	2009; 2019	30 (180 cars)	CP 001–CP 032	Shisanling Jingqu (Ming Tombs); Dingsilu	12 cars (CP0241-CP0246 and CP0321-CP0326) were withdrawn from service and remain in storage after suffering the crash damage on December 14, 2023.
SFM93 and BDK07		CRRC Qingdao Sifang; Beijing Subway Rolling Stock Equipment	2021	36 (216 cars)	CP 033–CP 068	Shisanling Jingqu (Ming Tombs); Dingsilu	
