= Xitucheng station =

Beijing Subway interchange station

Coordinates: 39°58′36″N 116°21′15″E

Xitucheng 西土城
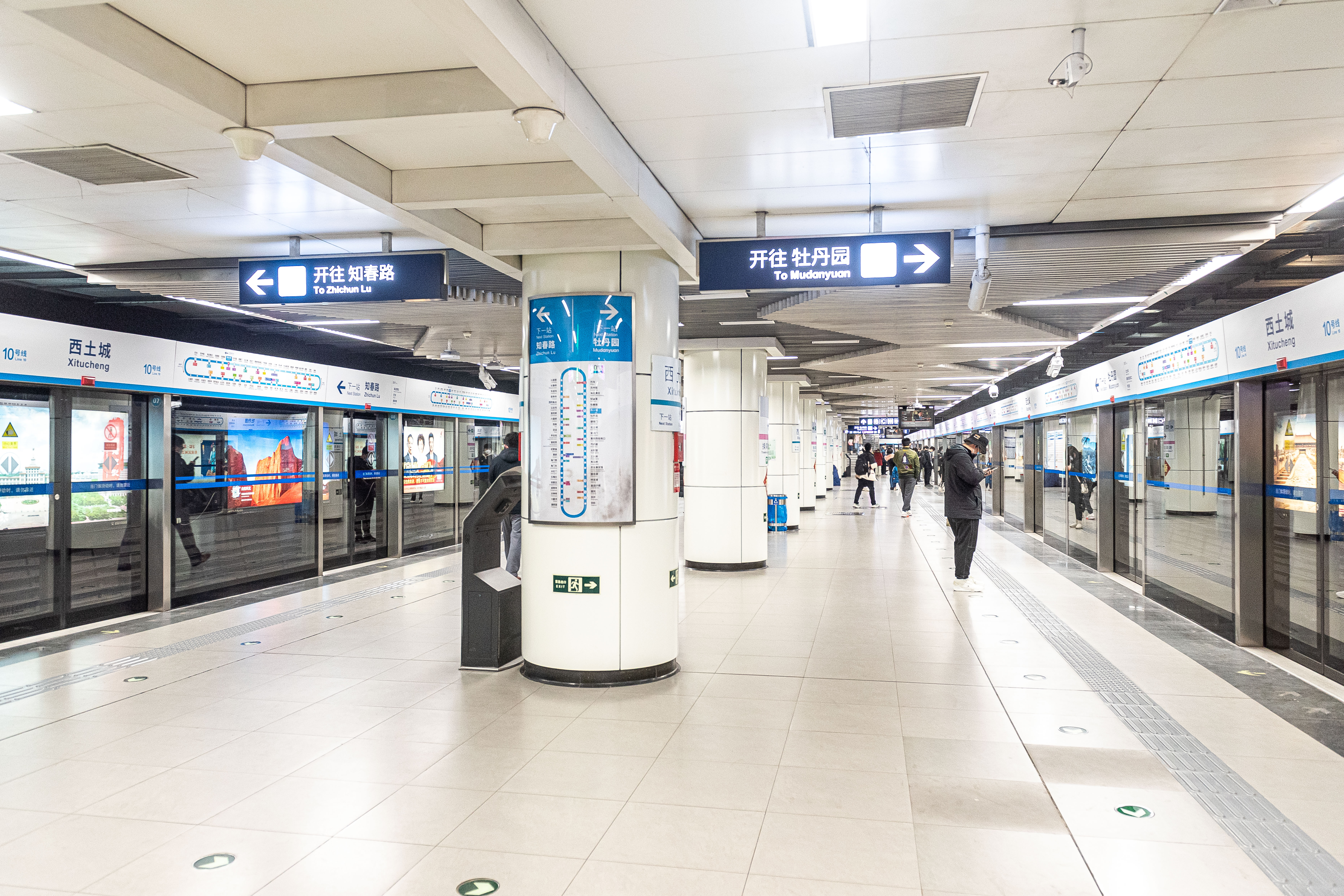
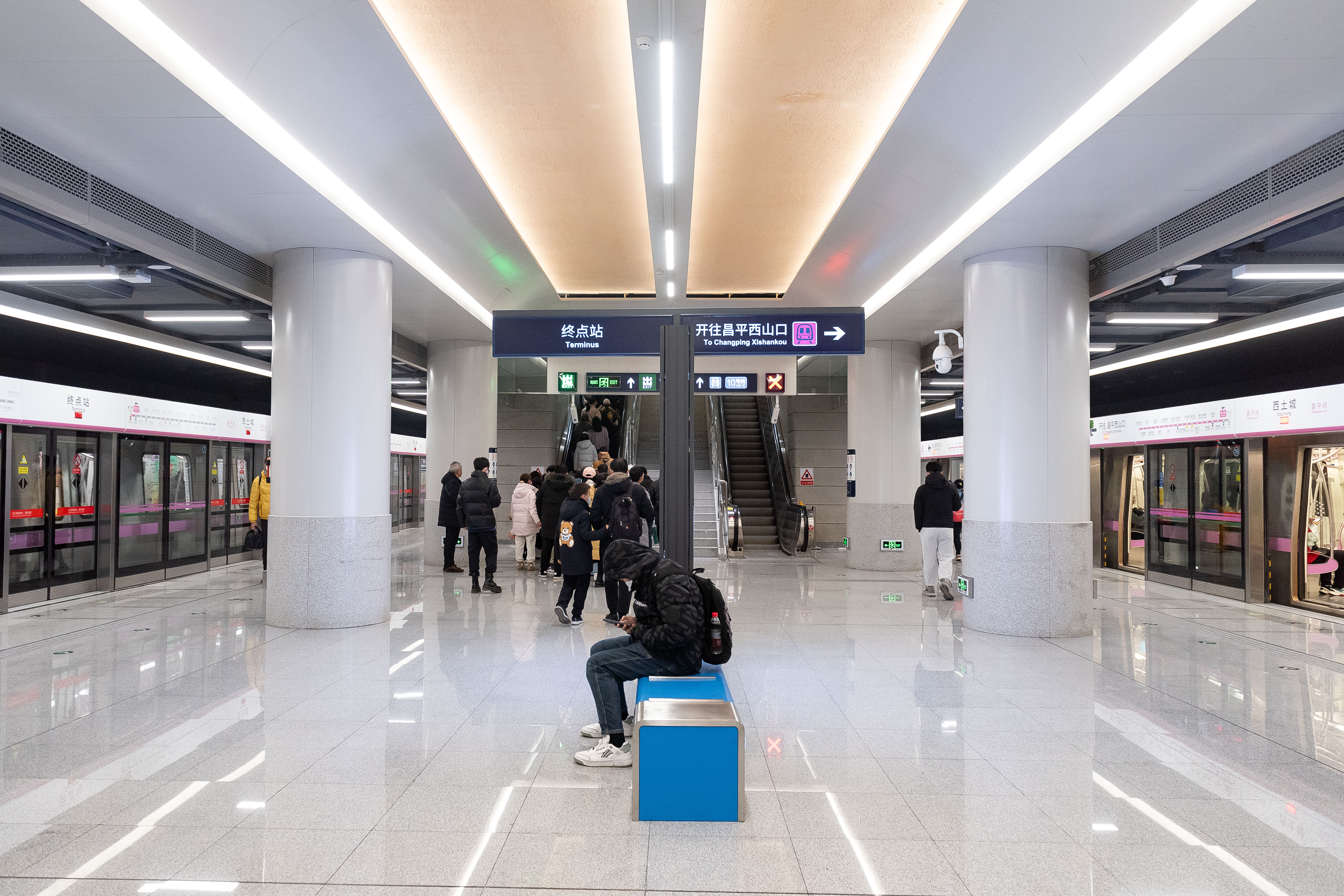
- Line 10 platform Changping line platform

General information
- Location: Zhichun Road / Beitucheng West Road (北土城西路) and Xueyuan Road / Xitucheng Road; Haidian District, Beijing; China
- Operator: Beijing Mass Transit Railway Operation Corporation Limited
- Lines: Line 10; Changping line
- Platforms: 4 (2 island platforms)
- Tracks: 4

Construction
- Structure type: Underground
- Accessible: Yes

History
- Opened: July 19, 2008; 18 years ago (Line 10); February 4, 2023; 3 years ago (Changping line)

Services
Preceding station	Beijing Subway	Following station
Zhichun Lu outer loop / anticlockwise	Line 10	Mudanyuan inner loop / clockwise
Xueyuanqiao towards Changping Xishankou	Changping line	Jimen Qiao Terminus
Location
- Location within Beijing

Xitucheng station (Chinese: 西土城站; pinyin: Xītǔchéng zhàn) is an interchange station on Line 10 and Changping line of the Beijing Subway.

== History ==
From September 19, 2021 to January 8, 2022, the station for Line 10 was renovated in preparation for interchange with the southern extension of the Changping line. Additionally, new stairs and escalators where added and station concourses were expanded. It reopened on January 9, 2022.

The station for Changping line opened on February 4, 2023. It was its southern terminus before the opening of Jimen Qiao on December 15, 2024.

== Station layout ==
The station underground island platforms for both Line 10 and Changping line.

== Exits ==
There are 6 exits, lettered A, B, C, D, E and F. Exits B, C and E are accessible via elevators.

== Station art ==
The Changping line station has 3 murals. The station hall has a mural named 'Tucheng Seal', the lintel wall of the escalator from the station hall to the north and south sides of the platform has a mural named 'Treading Flowers and Going Back', and the ceiling of the transfer passage is decorated with a mural named 'Sky Reverie'.

== Gallery ==
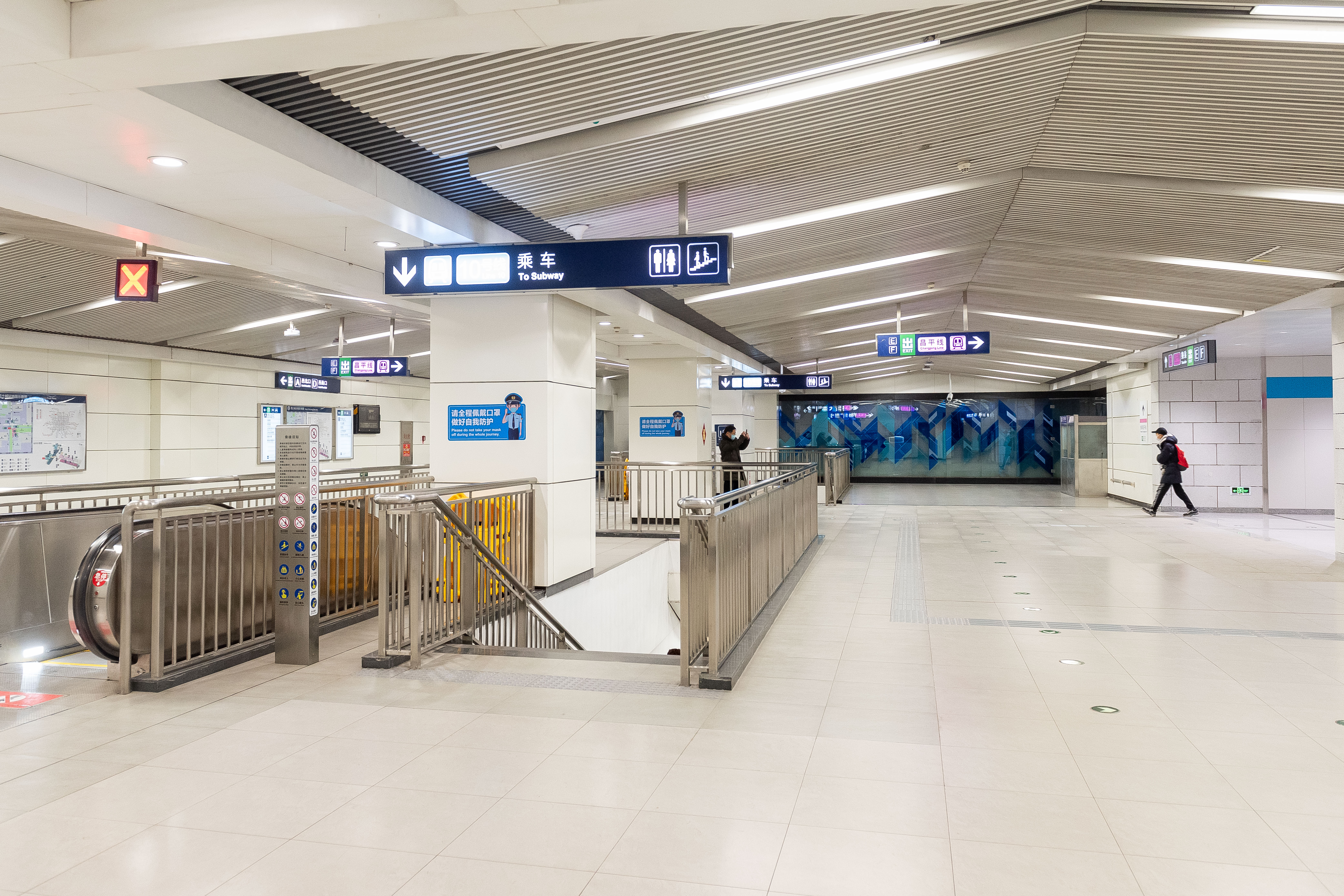
Line 10 west concourse

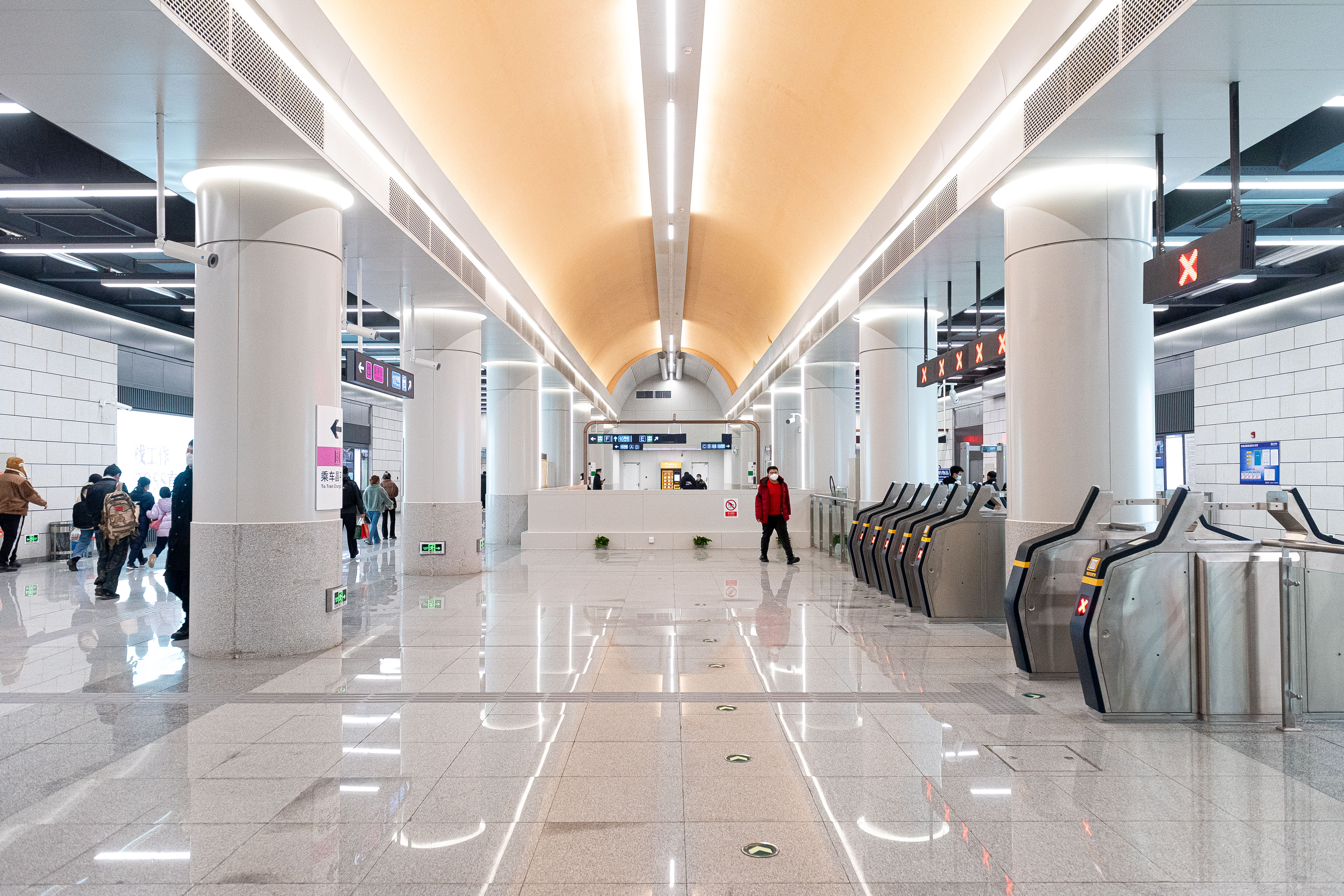
Changping line concourse
