= Changping Xishankou station =

Beijing Subway station

Changping Xishankou 昌平西山口
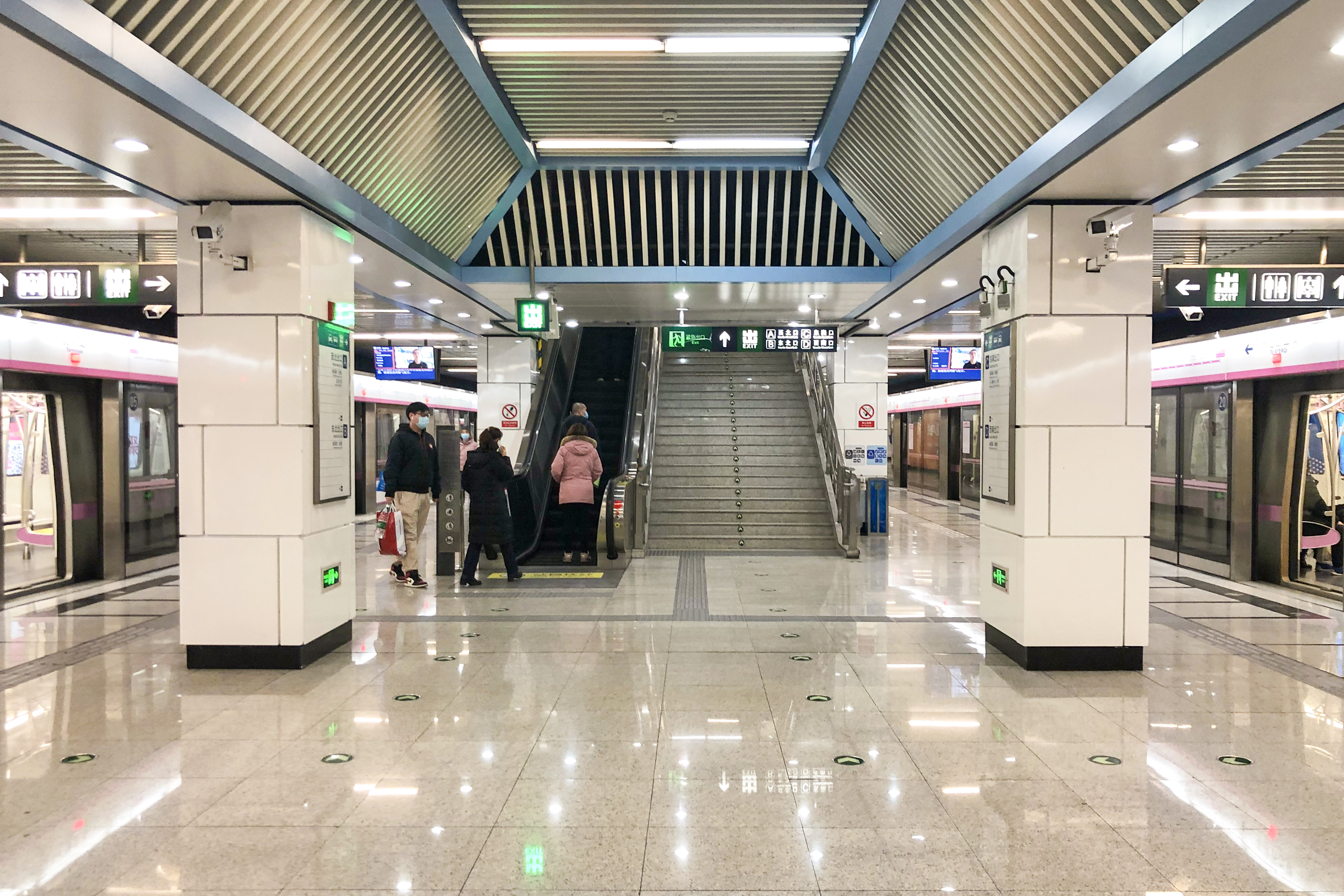
- Platform

General information
- Location: Nanjian Road (南涧路) and Wanxi Road (万西路); Shisanling, Changping District, Beijing; China
- Coordinates: 40°14′41″N 116°11′43″E
- Operator: Beijing Mass Transit Railway Operation Corporation Limited
- Line: Changping line
- Platforms: 2 (1 island platform)
- Tracks: 2

Construction
- Structure type: Underground
- Accessible: Yes

History
- Opened: December 26, 2015; 10 years ago

Services
| Preceding station | Beijing Subway | Following station |
|---|---|---|
| Terminus | Changping line | Ming Tombs towards Jimen Qiao |
Location
- Location within Beijing

Changping Xishankou station (Chinese: 昌平西山口站; pinyin: Chāngpíng Xīshānkǒu zhàn) is a station on the Changping Line of the Beijing Subway. It was opened on 26 December 2015. It is the current northern terminus of the line as well as the northernmost station in the entire Beijing Subway.

== Station layout ==
The station has an underground island platform.

== Exits ==
There are 4 exits, lettered A, B, C, and D. Exit B is wheelchair accessible.
