= Xueyuanqiao station =

Beijing Subway station

Xueyuanqiao 学院桥
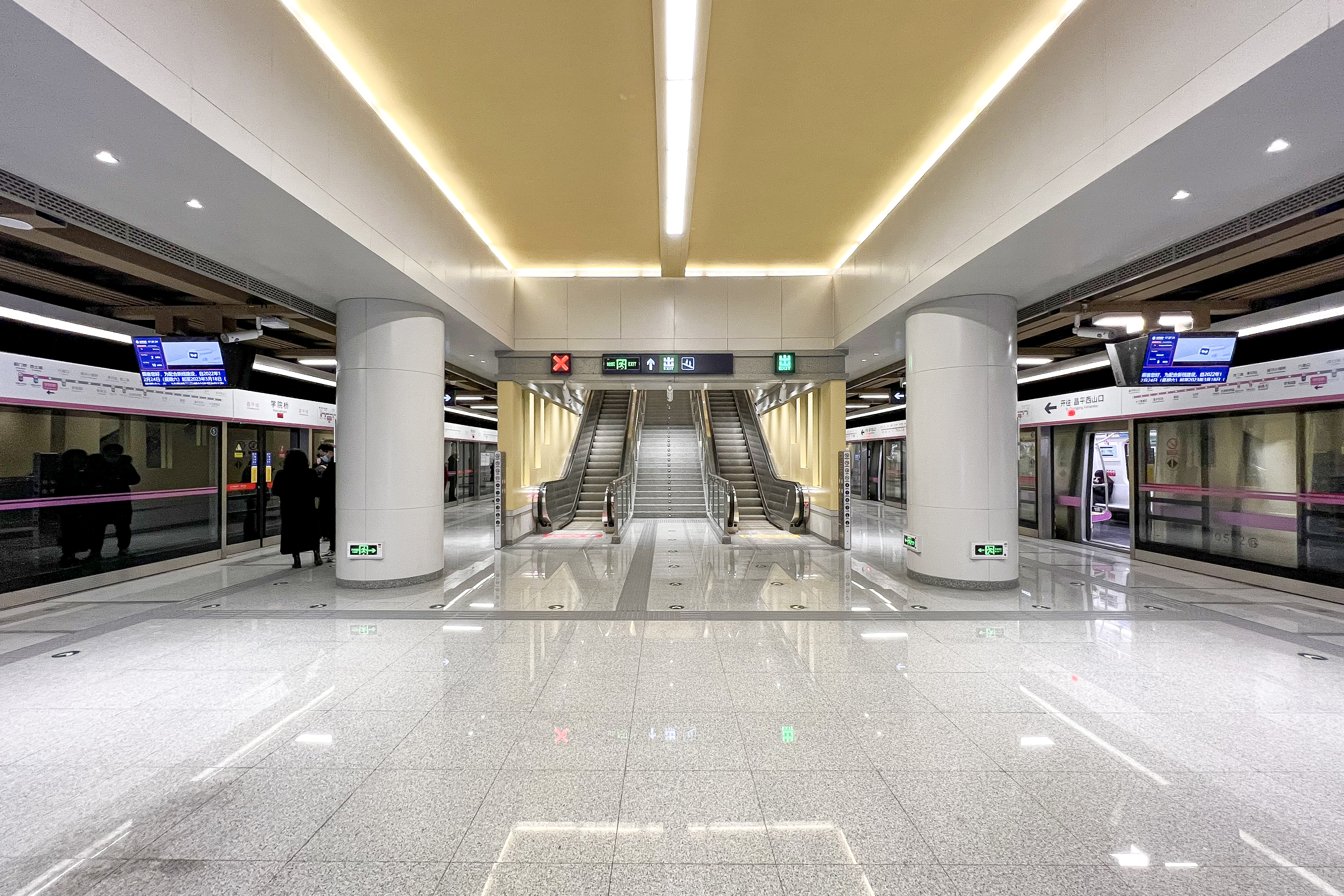
- Platform

General information
- Location: Intersection of Xueyuan Road (学院路) and North 4th Ring Road (北四环中路) north of Xueyuan Bridge; Huayuanlu Subdistrict / Xueyuanlu Subdistrict, Haidian District, Beijing; China
- Coordinates: 39.98556°N 116.34727°E
- Operator: Beijing Mass Transit Railway Operation Corporation Limited
- Line: Changping line
- Platforms: 2 (1 island platform)
- Tracks: 2

Construction
- Structure type: Underground
- Accessible: Yes

History
- Opened: February 4, 2023; 3 years ago

Services
Preceding station	Beijing Subway	Following station
Liudao Kou towards Changping Xishankou	Changping line	Xitucheng towards Jimen Qiao
Location
- Location within Beijing

Xueyuanqiao station (Chinese: 学院桥站; pinyin: Xuéyuànqiáo zhàn) is a subway station on the Changping line of the Beijing Subway. It opened on February 4, 2023.

== Layout ==
The station has an underground island platform. There are 5 exits, lettered A, B, C1, C2 and D1. Exit B is accessible via an elevator.

== Station art ==
There is a mural named 'Flowers Smile at Me' in the east of the station hall, which shows the images of science students who look the same but have their own unique spiritual outlook. The three entrances and exits of A, C, and D are arranged differently according to the adjacent colleges with different murals. The mural 'Geological Era' is arranged at the passageway of Exit A near China University of Geosciences (Beijing), and the mural 'Vision of Love' with 'health' as the starting point is installed at the passageway of Exit C near Peking University Health Science Center. At the passageway of Exit D leading to the Beijing University of Aeronautics and Astronautics, a mural is decorated as a 'tunnel connecting the universe and the future'. It is called 'Dream Space Station'.

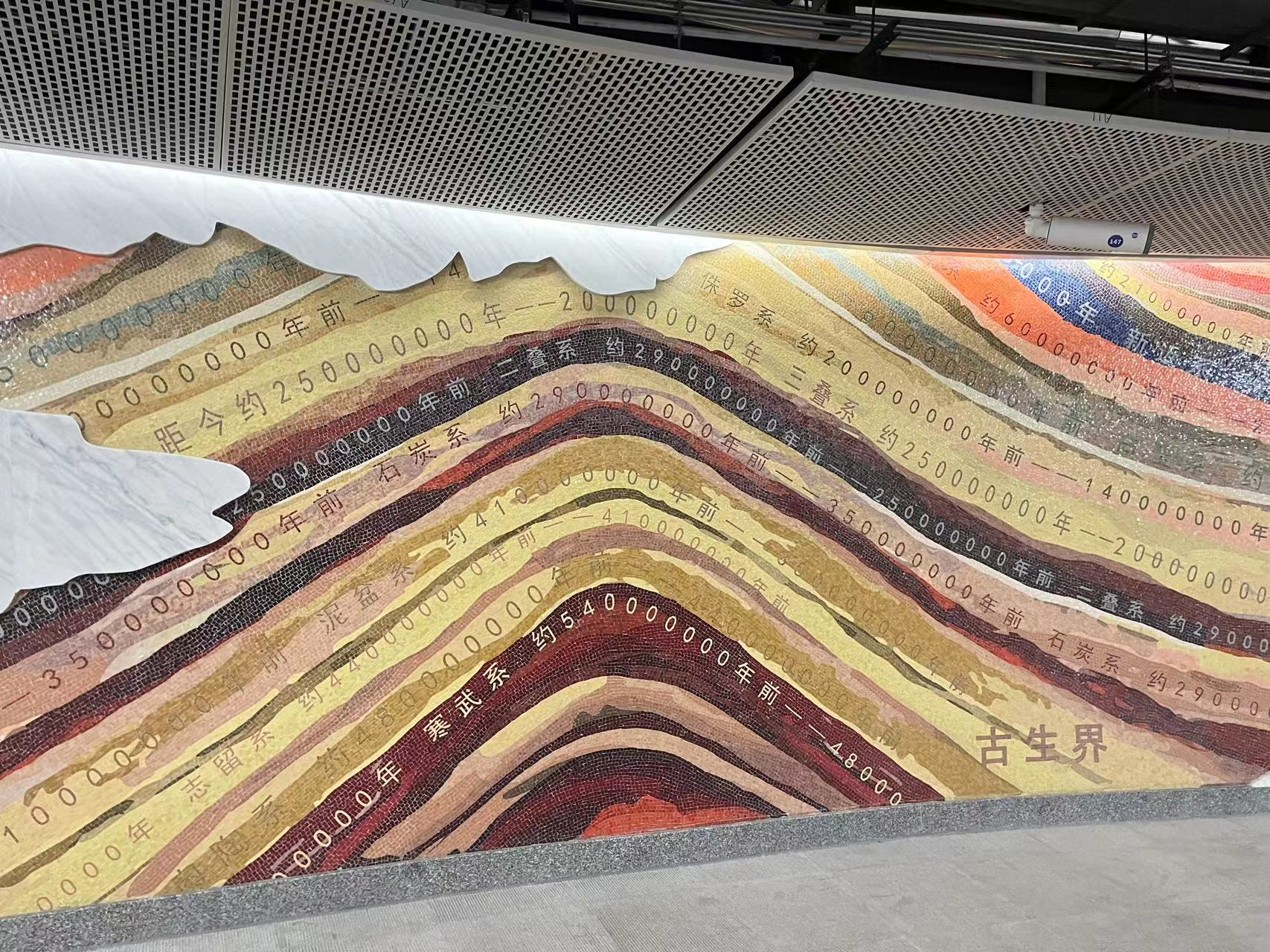
Mural of 'Geological Era'

== Gallery ==
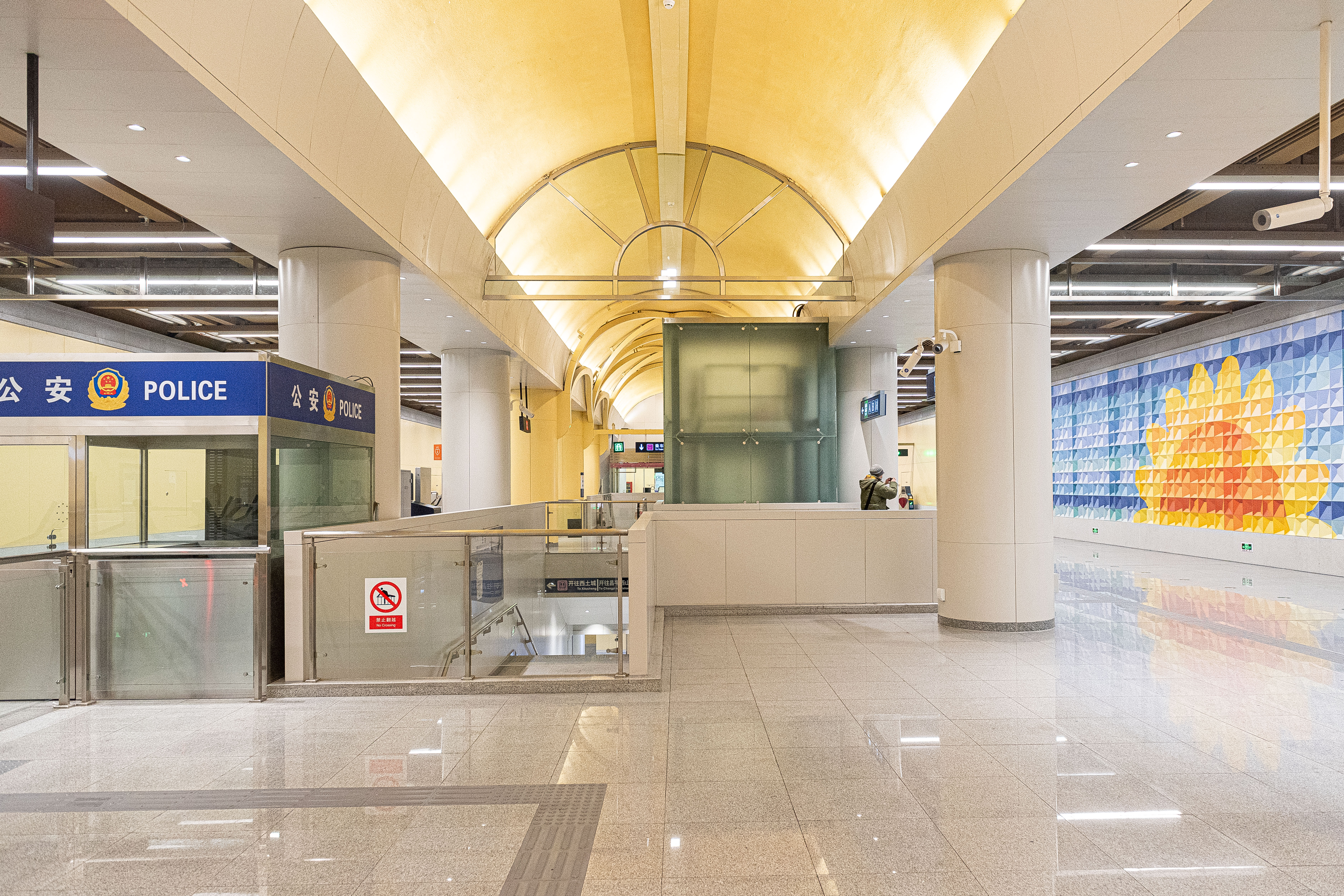
Concourse
