= Xuezhiyuan station =

Beijing Subway station

Xuezhiyuan 学知园
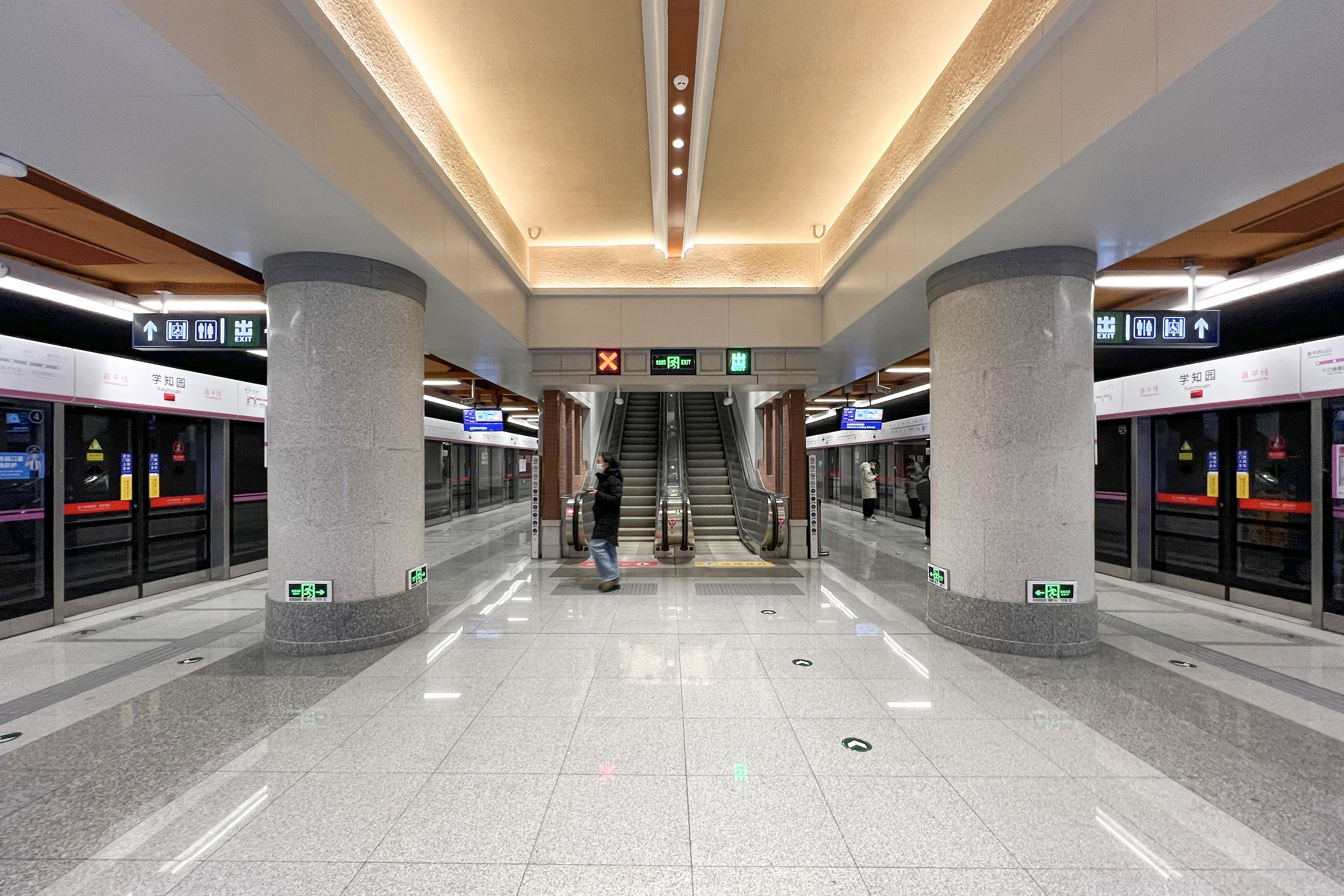
- Platform

General information
- Location: Intersection of Xueqing Road (学清路) and Yuequan Road (月泉路); Xueyuanlu Subdistrict, Haidian District, Beijing; China
- Coordinates: 40.01393°N 116.34584°E
- Operator: Beijing Mass Transit Railway Operation Corporation Limited
- Line: Changping line
- Platforms: 2 (1 island platform)
- Tracks: 2

Construction
- Structure type: Underground
- Accessible: Yes

History
- Opened: February 4, 2023; 3 years ago

Services
| Preceding station | Beijing Subway | Following station |
|---|---|---|
| Qinghe Xiaoyingqiao towards Changping Xishankou | Changping line | Liudao Kou towards Jimen Qiao |
Location
- Location within Beijing

Xuezhiyuan station (Chinese: 学知园站; pinyin: Xuézhīyuán zhàn) is a subway station on the Changping line of the Beijing Subway. It opened on February 4, 2023.

== History ==
The project name of the station is Xueqinglu station (学清路站). On July 19, 2021, in the naming plan for the stations on the southern section of the Changping Line announced by the Beijing Municipal Commission of Planning and Natural Resources, the station was renamed to Xueqing station (学清站). In June 2022, the station was officially named Xuezhiyuan station.

== Layout ==
The station has an underground island platform. There are 3 exits, lettered B, C and D. Exit B is accessible via an elevator. Exit A is under construction.

== Station art ==
There is a mural named 'Youth Campus' in the paid area of the station hall, showing the scenes of university life such as libraries, basketball courts, self-study rooms, dormitories, and laboratories.

== Gallery ==
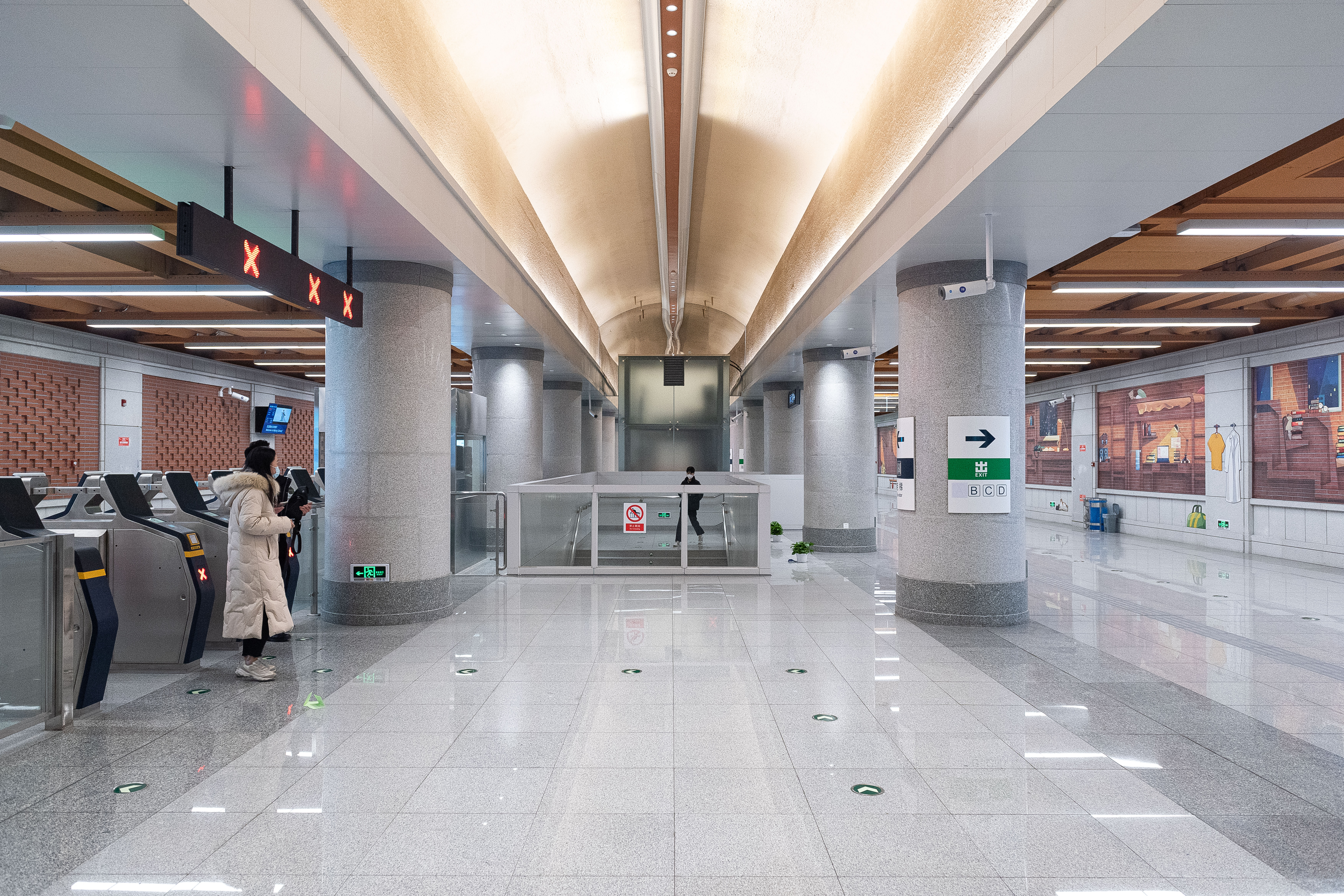
Concourse
