= Liudao Kou station =

Beijing Subway station

Coordinates: 40.0011°N 116.3509°E

Liudao Kou 六道口
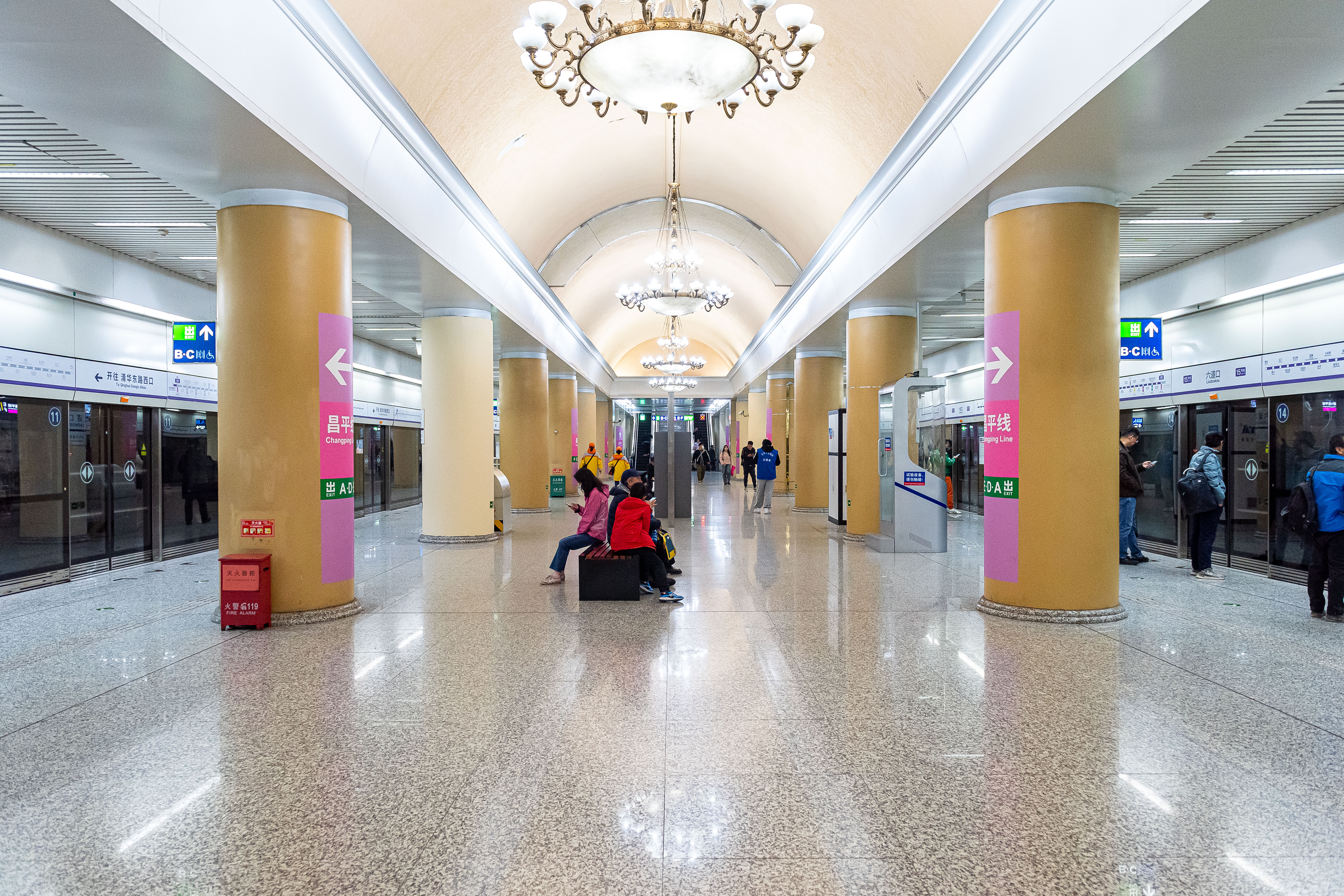
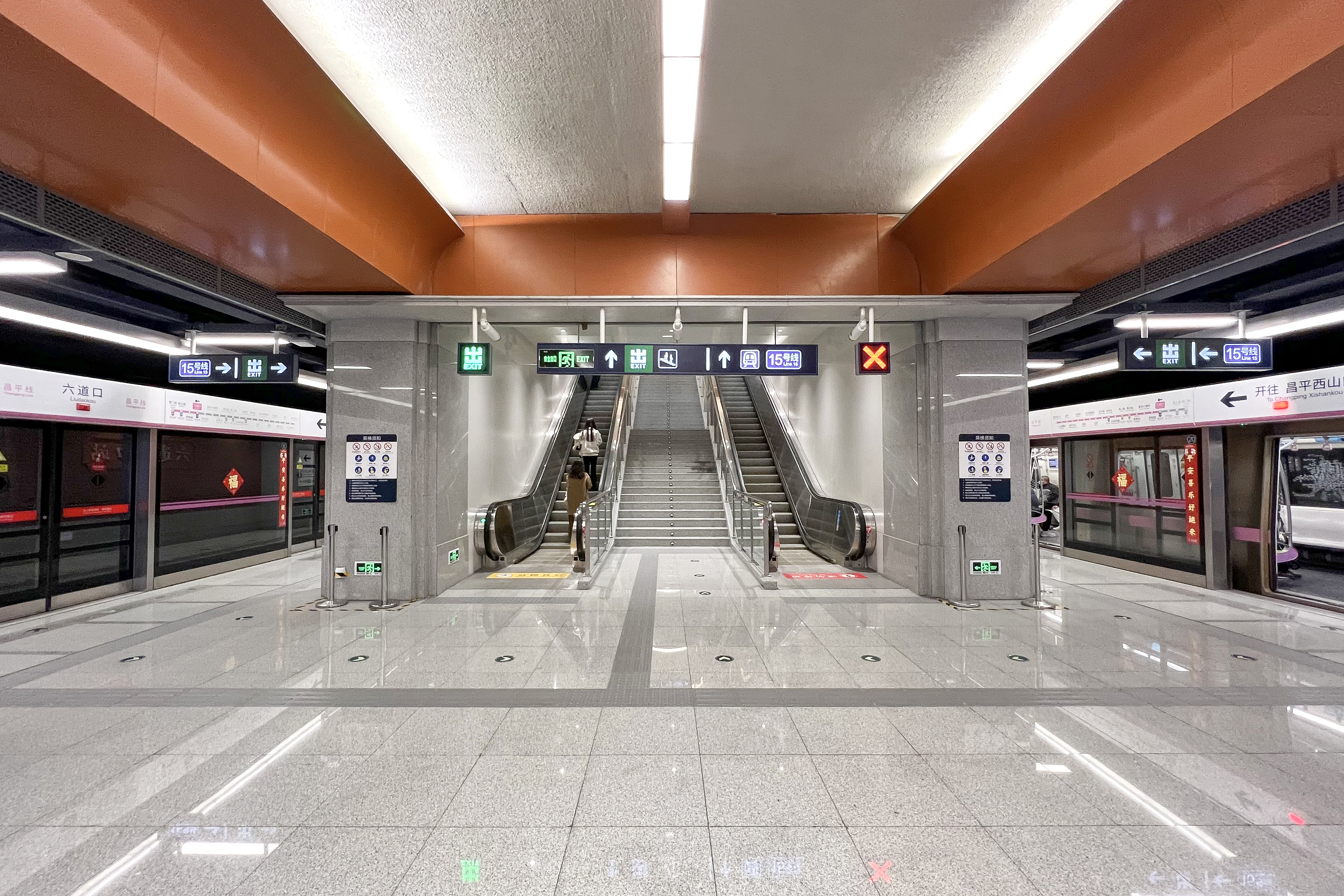
- Line 15 platform Changping line platform

General information
- Location: Qinghua East Road (清华东路) and Xueyuan Road (学院路) / Xueqing Road; Haidian District, Beijing; China
- Operator: Beijing Mass Transit Railway Operation Corporation Limited
- Lines: Line 15; Changping line
- Platforms: 4 (2 island platforms)
- Tracks: 4

Construction
- Structure type: Underground
- Accessible: Yes

History
- Opened: December 28, 2014; 11 years ago (Line 15); February 4, 2023; 3 years ago (Changping line)

Services
Preceding station	Beijing Subway	Following station
Qinghua Donglu Xikou Terminus	Line 15	Beishatan towards Fengbo
Xuezhiyuan towards Changping Xishankou	Changping line	Xueyuanqiao towards Jimen Qiao
Location
- Location within Beijing

Liudao Kou station (Chinese: 六道口站; pinyin: Liùdàokǒu zhàn) is an interchange station between Line 15 and Changping line of the Beijing Subway. The station for Line 15 was opened on December 28, 2014. The station for Changping line opened on February 4, 2023.

== Station layout ==
The station has underground island platforms for both Line 15 and Changping line.

== Exits ==
There are 7 exits, lettered A1, A2, B, C, D, E and F. Exits C, D and E are accessible via elevators.

== Station art ==
A curved wall inside the transfer channel of this station is decorated with a mural named 'Flowers Like Brocade', and the Changping line station hall and transfer node are decorated with a mural named 'Growth' that embodies 'trees and the people who plant trees'.

== Gallery ==
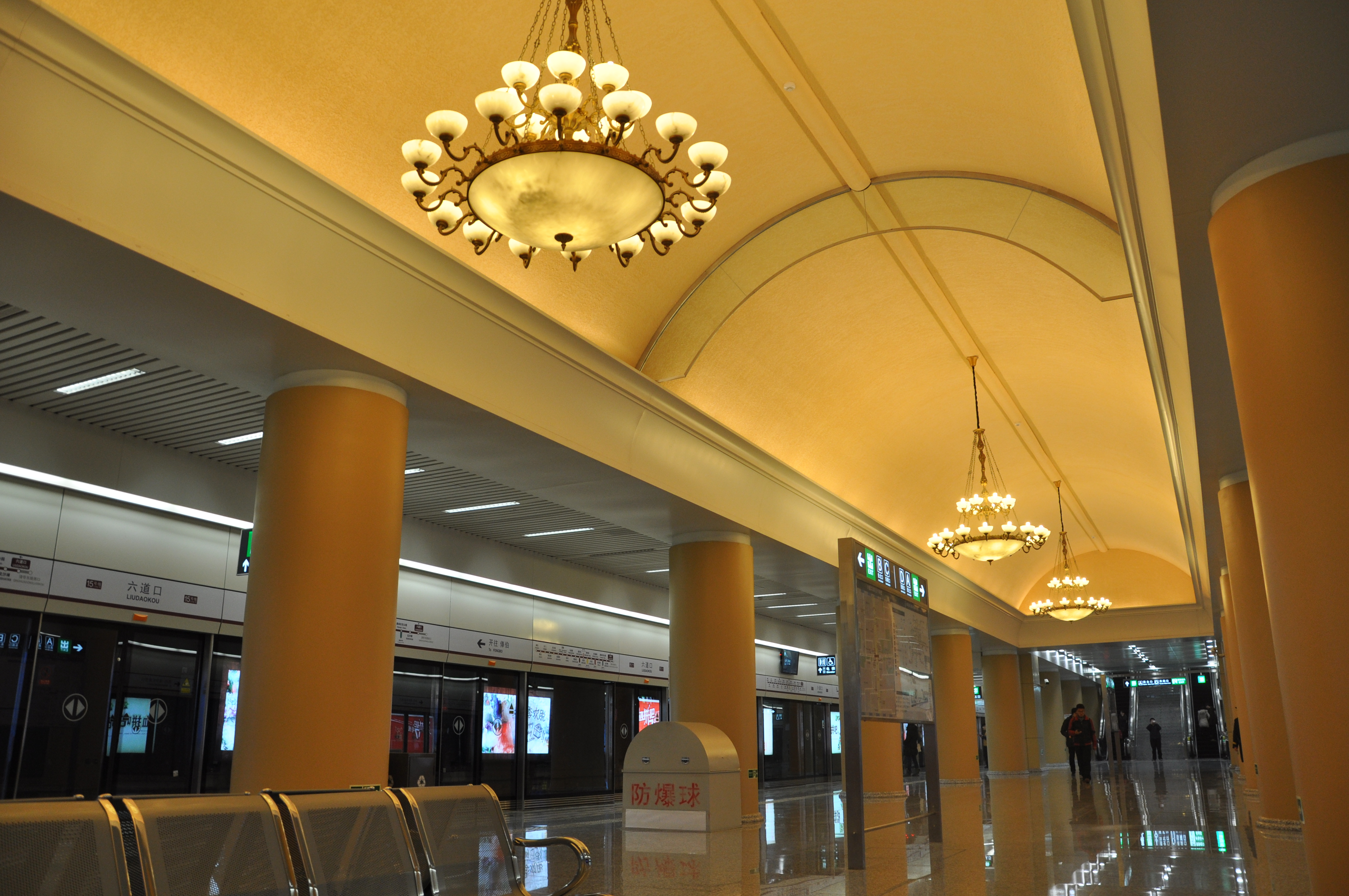
Line 15 platform

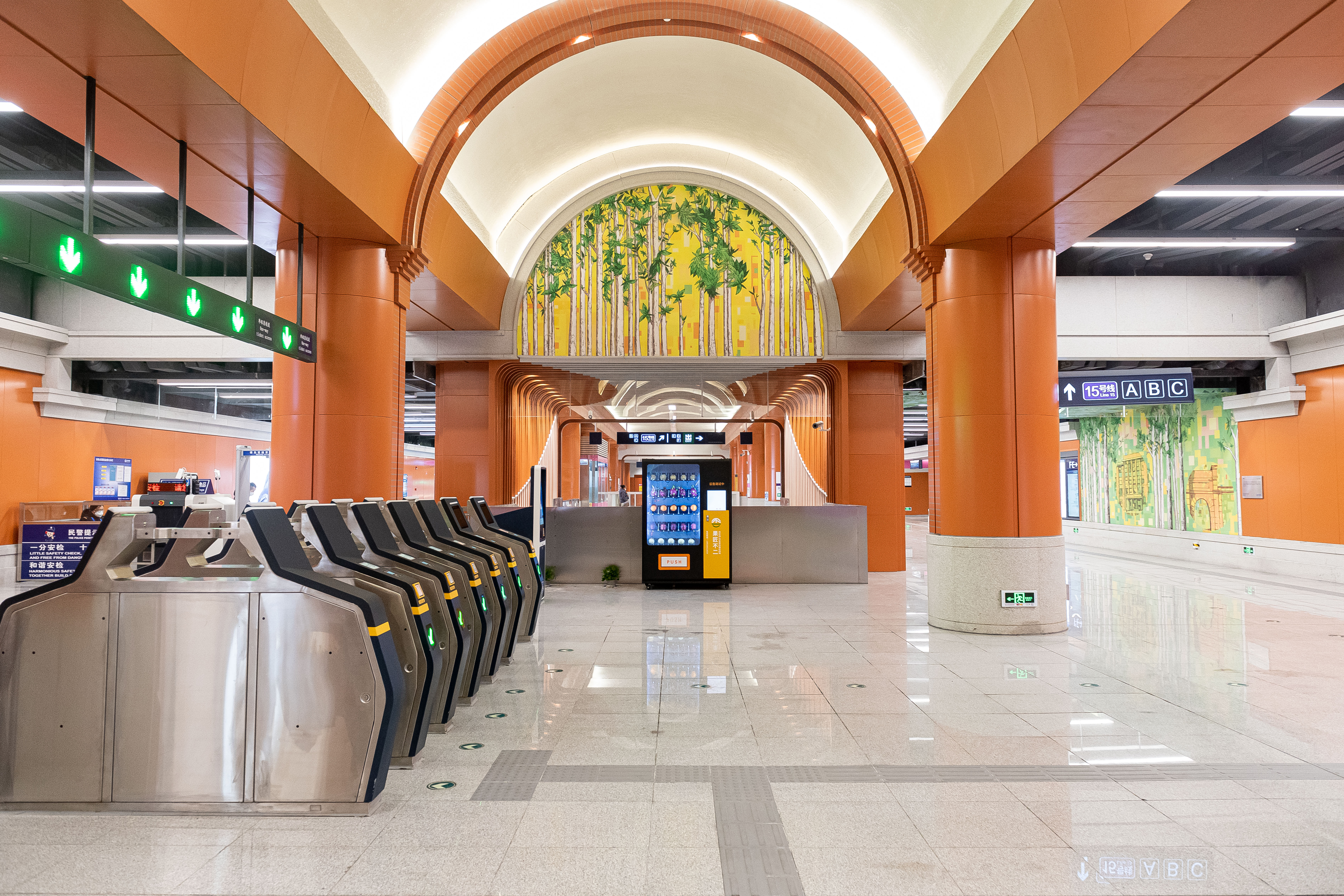
Changping line concourse
