= Beishatan station =

Beijing Subway station

Beishatan 北沙滩
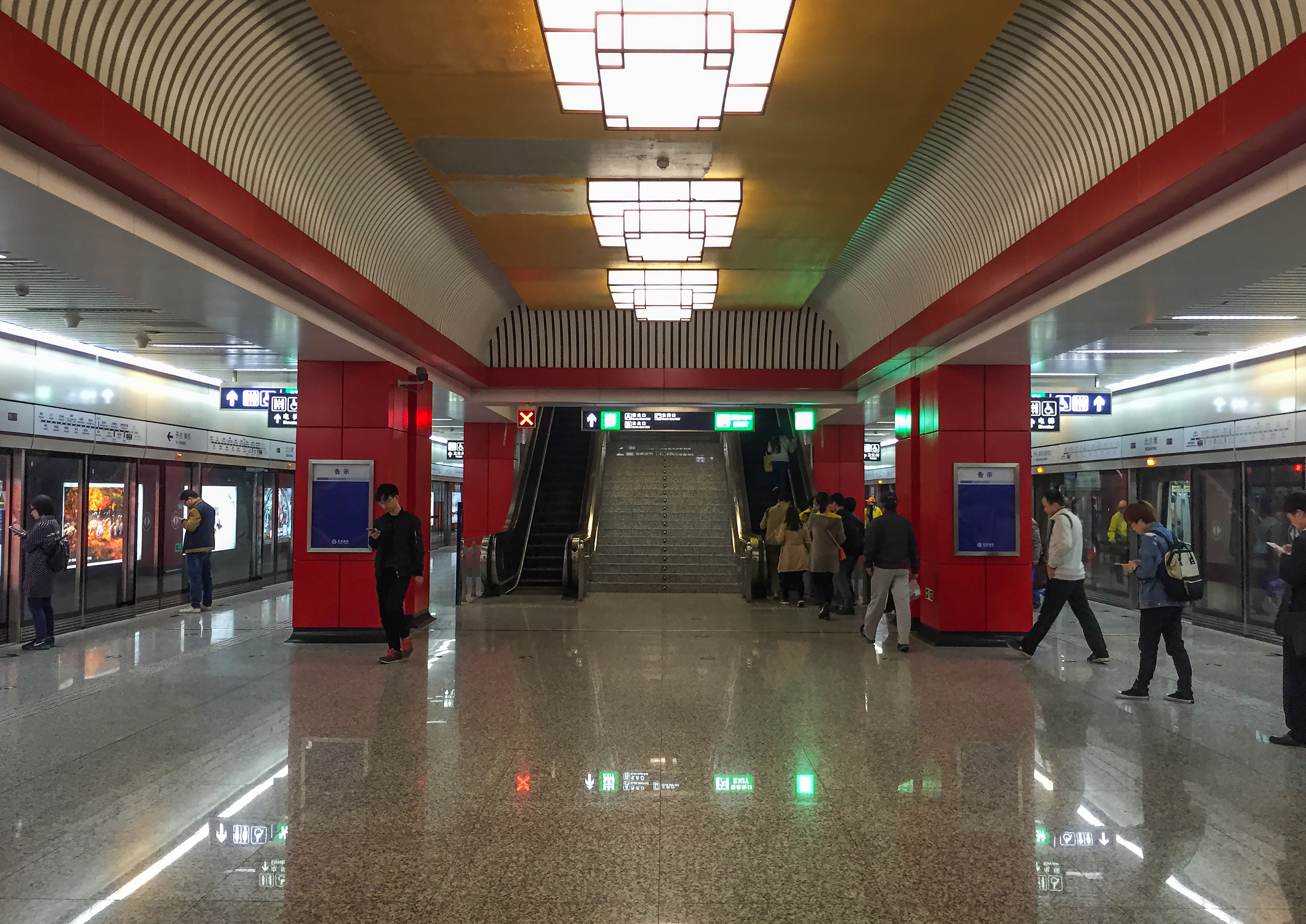
- Station platform in April 2017

General information
- Location: Beishatan Bridge (北沙滩桥), Qinghua East Road / Datun Road at G6 Jingzang Expressway; Haidian District / Chaoyang District, Beijing; China
- Coordinates: 40.0015°N 116.3690°E
- Operator: Beijing Mass Transit Railway Operation Corporation Limited
- Line: Line 15
- Platforms: 2 (1 island platform)
- Tracks: 2

Construction
- Structure type: Underground
- Accessible: Yes

History
- Opened: December 28, 2014; 11 years ago

Services
| Preceding station | Beijing Subway | Following station |
|---|---|---|
| Liudao Kou towards Qinghua Donglu Xikou | Line 15 | Olympic Park towards Fengbo |
Location
- Location within Beijing

Beishatan station (simplified Chinese: 北沙滩站; traditional Chinese: 北沙灘站; pinyin: Běishātān zhàn) is a station on Line 15 of the Beijing Subway. It was opened on December 28, 2014 as a part of the stretch between Wangjingxi and Qinghua Donglu Xikou and is located between Olympic Park and Liudaokou stations. The station is named after Beishatan Bridge (北沙滩桥) on Jingzang Expressway.

== Station layout ==
The station has an underground island platform.

== Exits ==
There are 4 exits, lettered A, B1, B2, and C. Exits B1 and C are accessible.

== Gallery ==
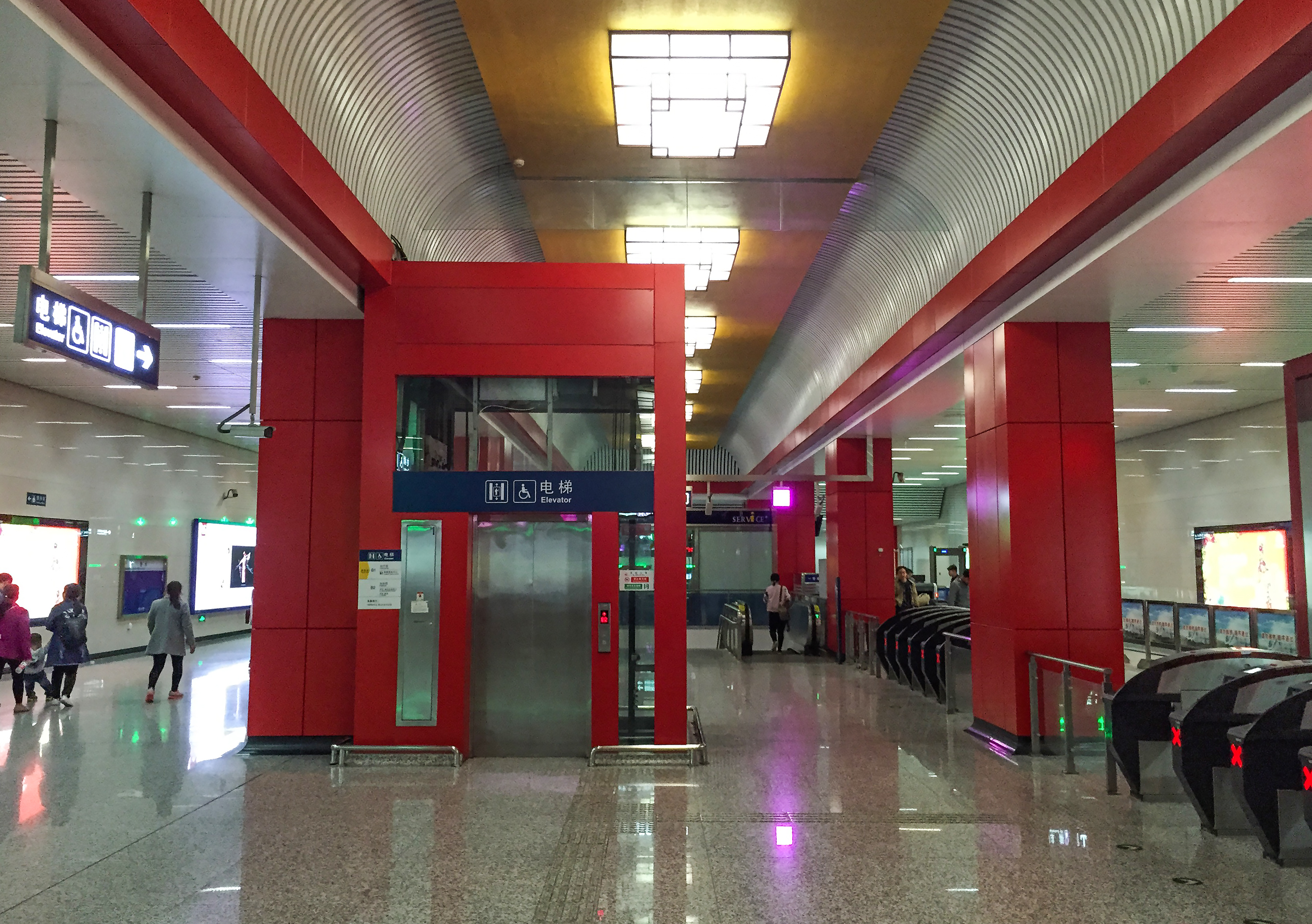
Concourse
