= Beitaipingzhuang station =

Beijing Subway Line 12 and Line 19 station

Coordinates: 39.96644°N 116.363963°E

Beitaipingzhuang 北太平庄
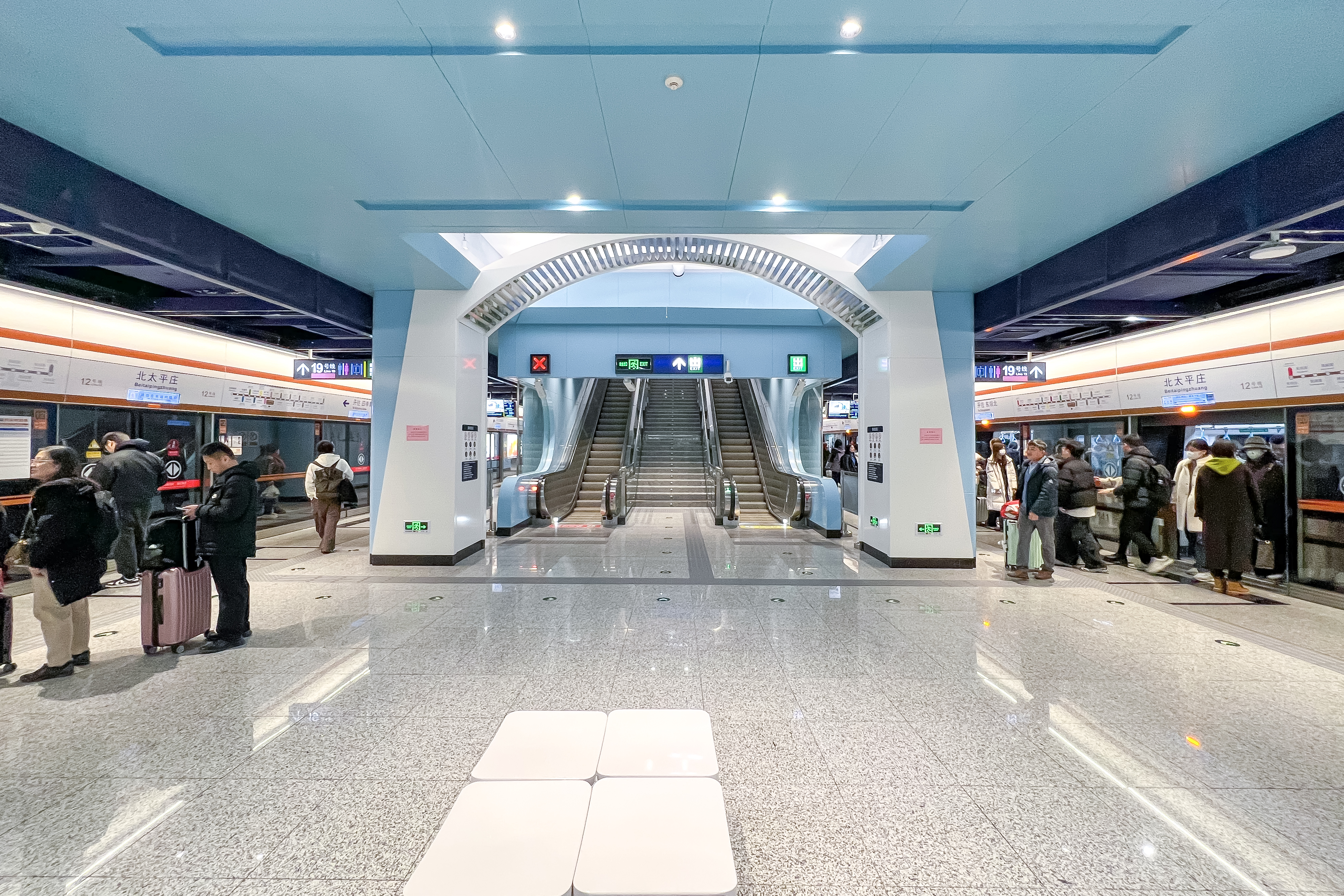
- Line 12 platform

General information
- Location: Intersection of North 3rd Ring Road, Beitaipingzhuang Road and Xinjiekou Outer Street, Haidian District, Beijing; China
- Operator: Beijing Metro Operation Administration (BJMOA) Corp., Ltd. (Line 19)
- Lines: Line 12; Line 19
- Platforms: 4 (2 island platforms)
- Tracks: 4

Construction
- Structure type: Underground
- Accessible: Yes

History
- Opened: Line 19: July 30, 2022; 4 years ago; Line 12: December 15, 2024; 20 months ago

Services
Preceding station	Beijing Subway	Following station
Jimen Qiao towards Sijiqing Qiao	Line 12	Madian Qiao towards Dongbabei
Mudanyuan Terminus	Line 19	Jishuitan towards Xingong
Location
- Location within Beijing

Beitaipingzhuang station (Chinese: 北太平庄站; pinyin: Běitàipíngzhuāng Zhàn) is an interchange station between Line 12 and Line 19 of the Beijing Subway. The station for Line 19 opened on 30 July 2022, and the station for Line 12 opened on December 15, 2024.

== Platform layout ==
The station has underground island platforms on both Line 12 and Line 19.

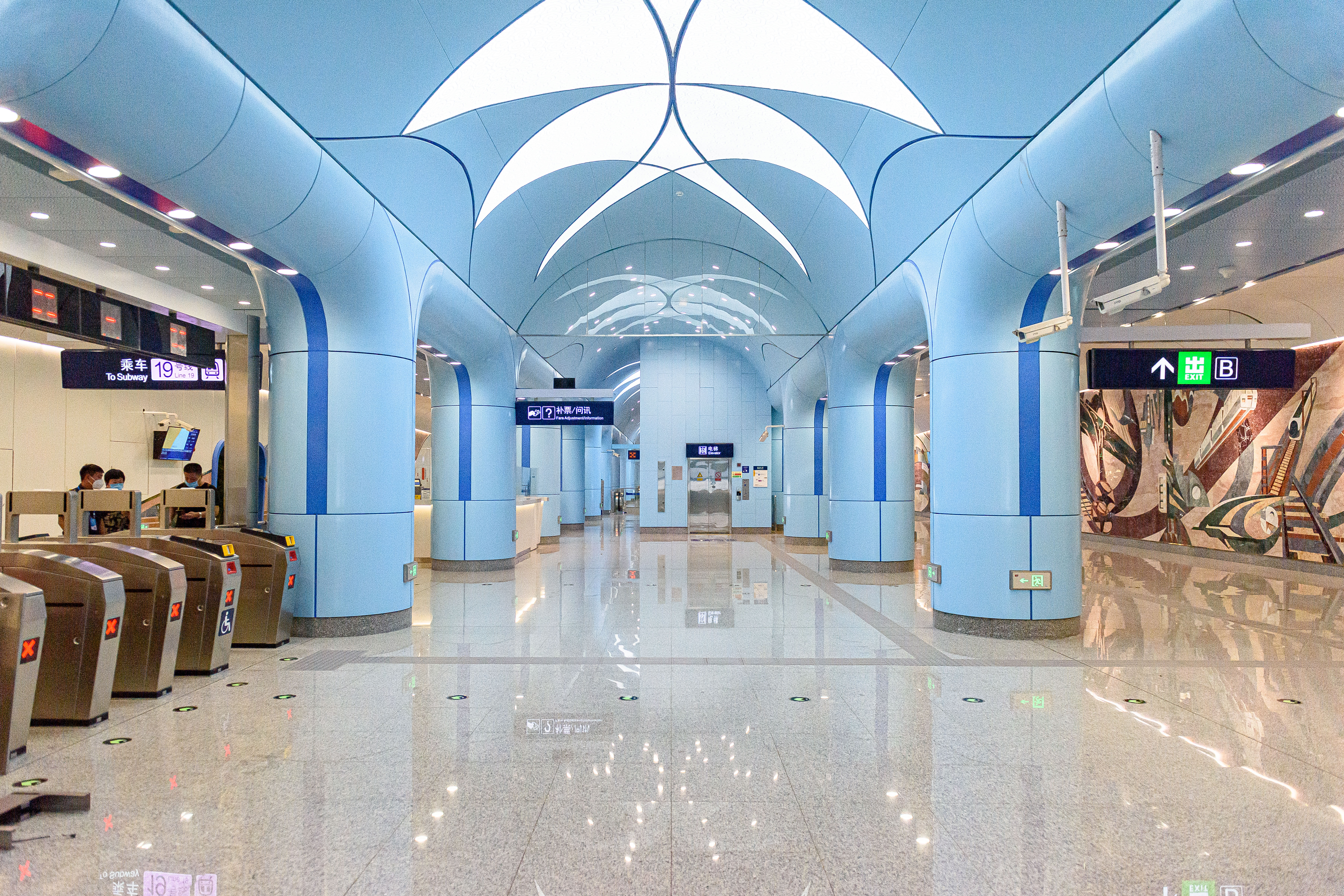
Line 19 concourse

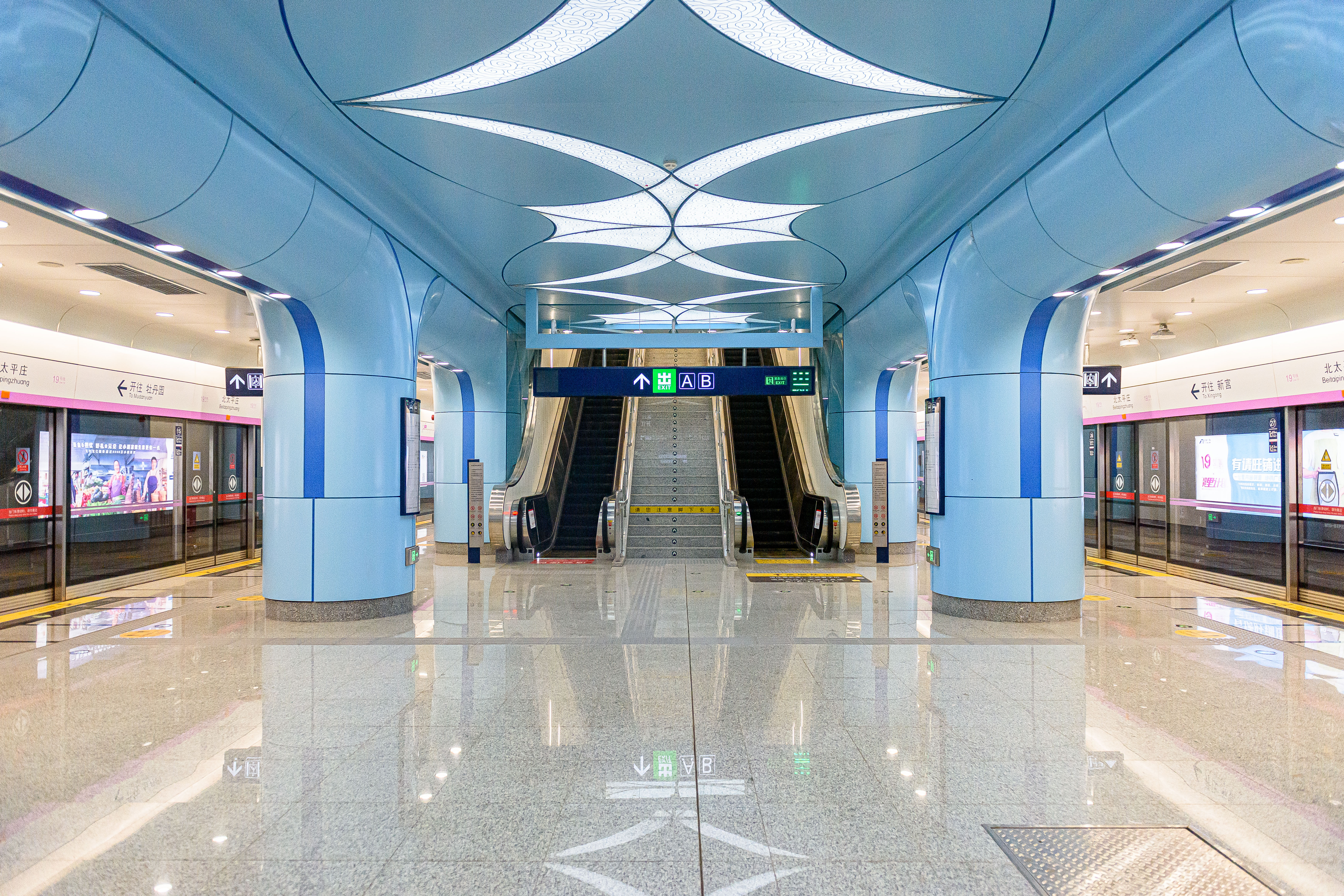
Line 19 platform

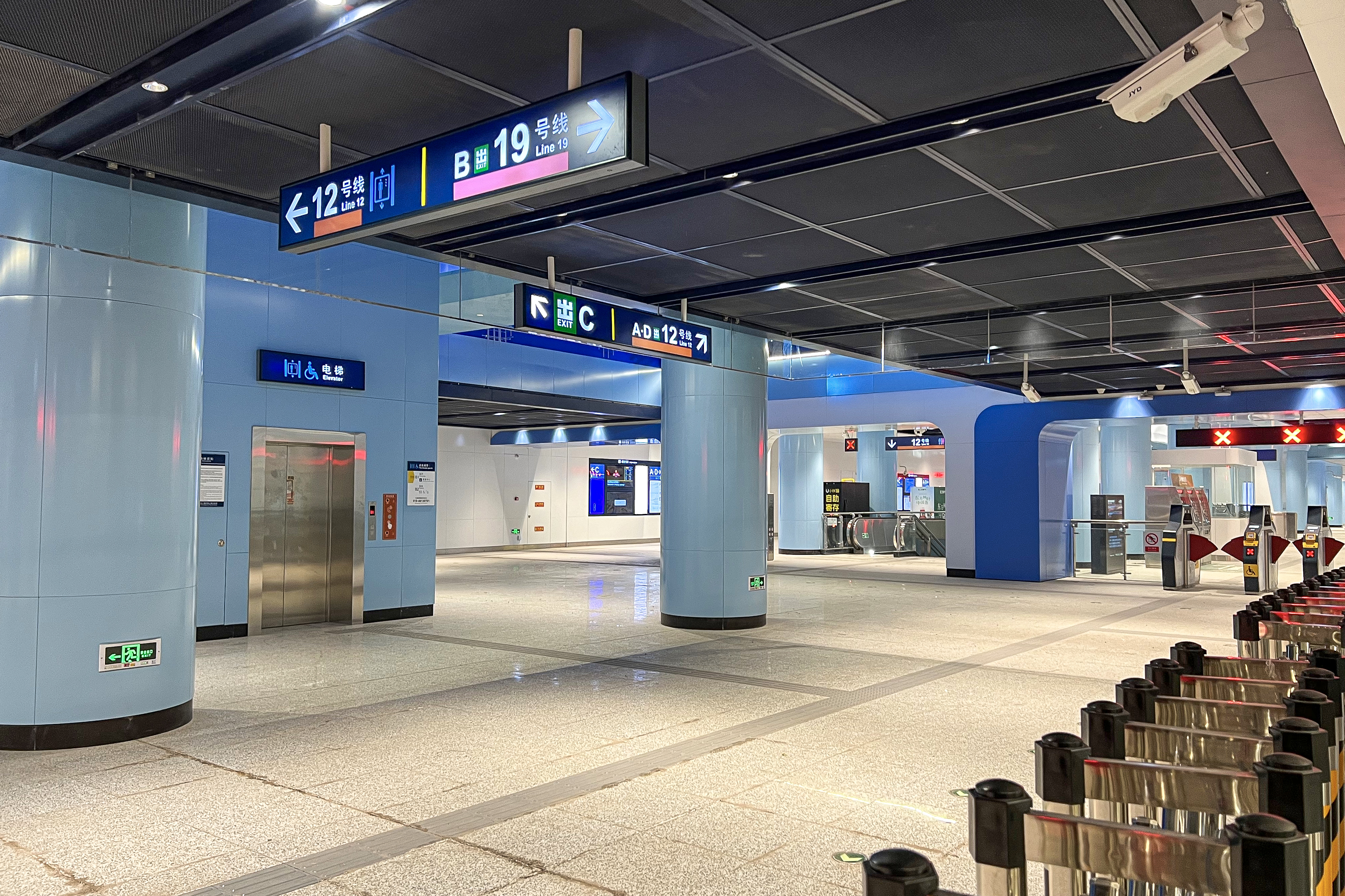
Line 12 concourse (west side)

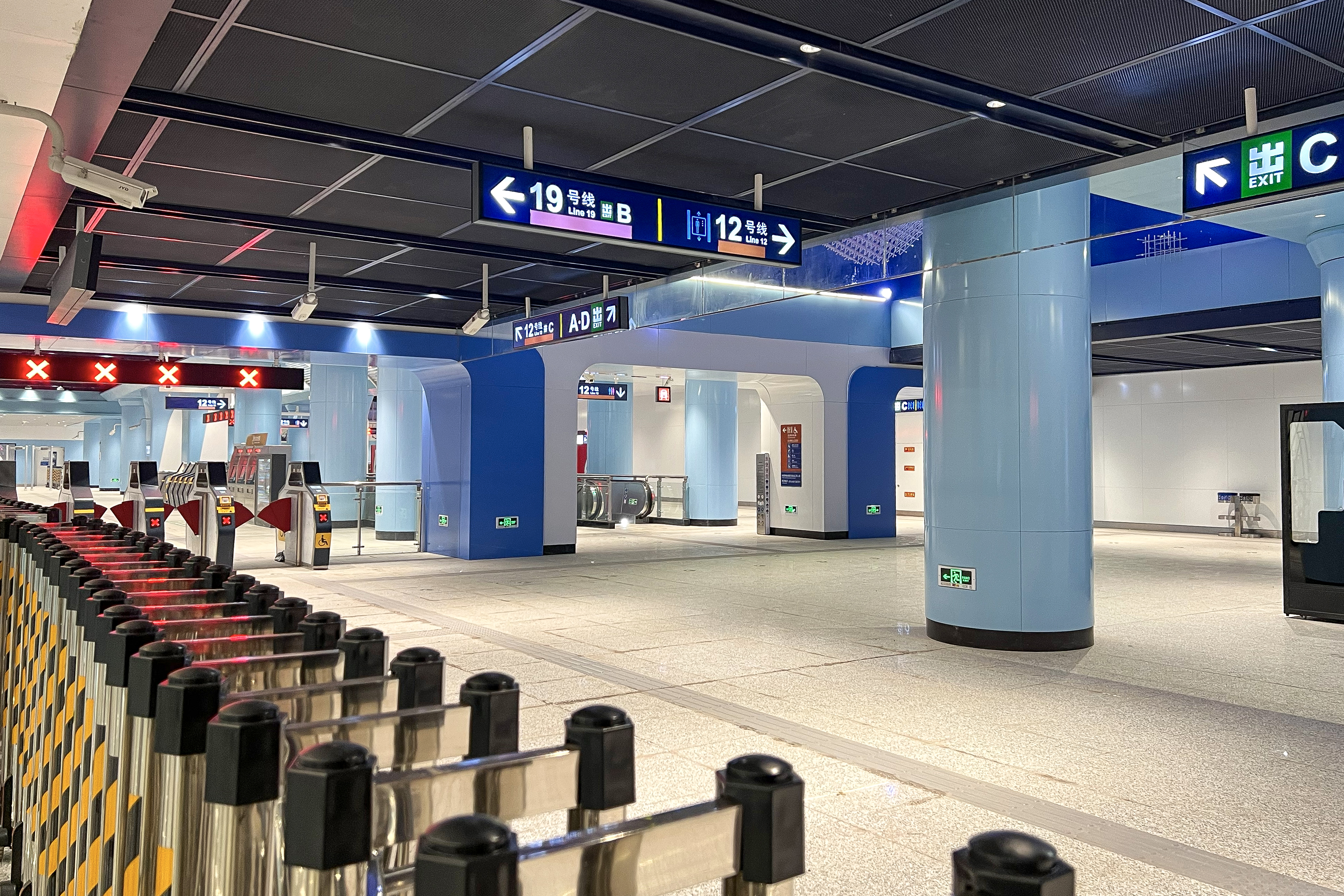
Line 12 concourse (east side)

== Exits ==
There are 5 exits, lettered A, B, C, D_{1} and D_{2}. Exit A has an accessible elevator. There is an unassigned elevator-only exit as well.

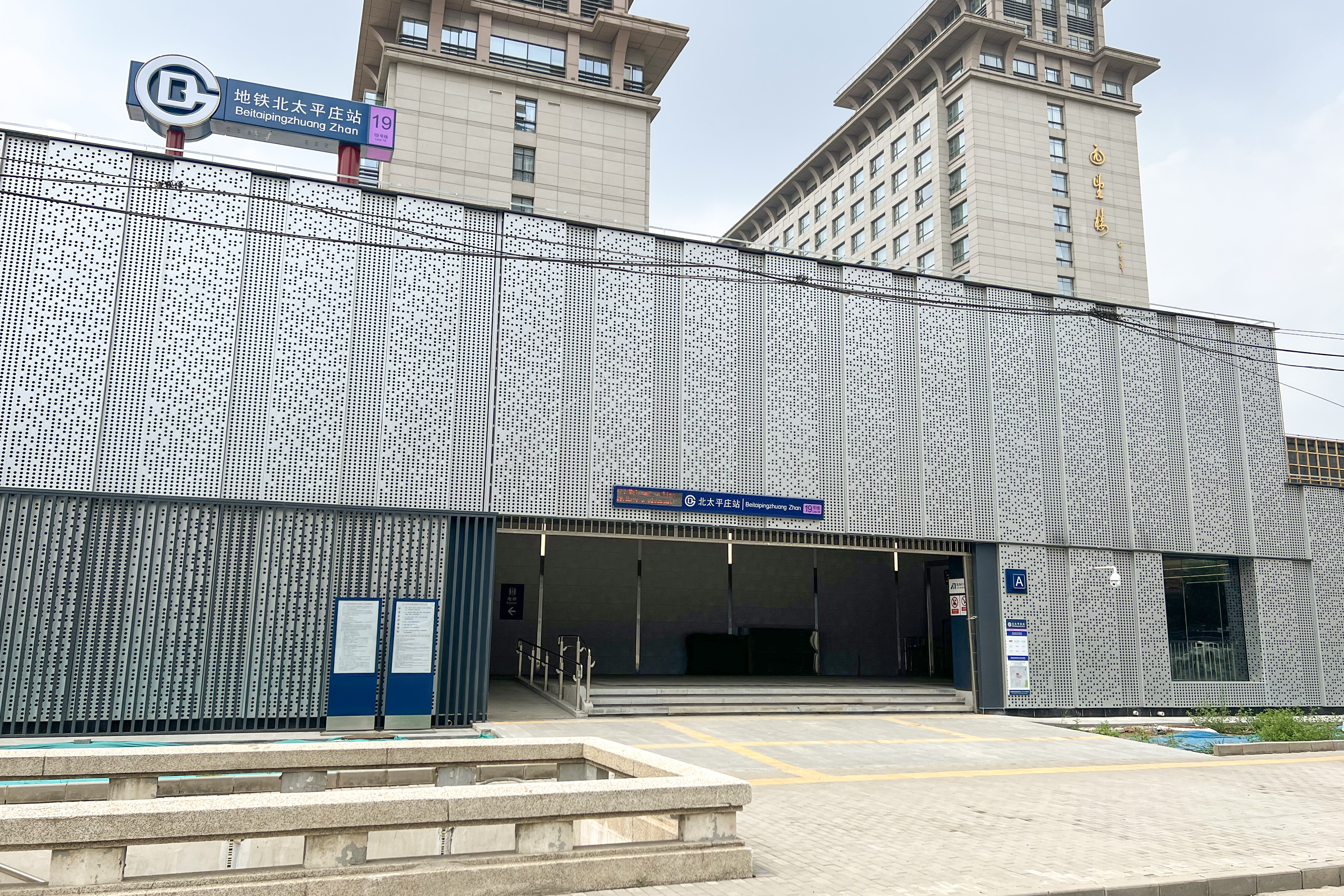
Exit A

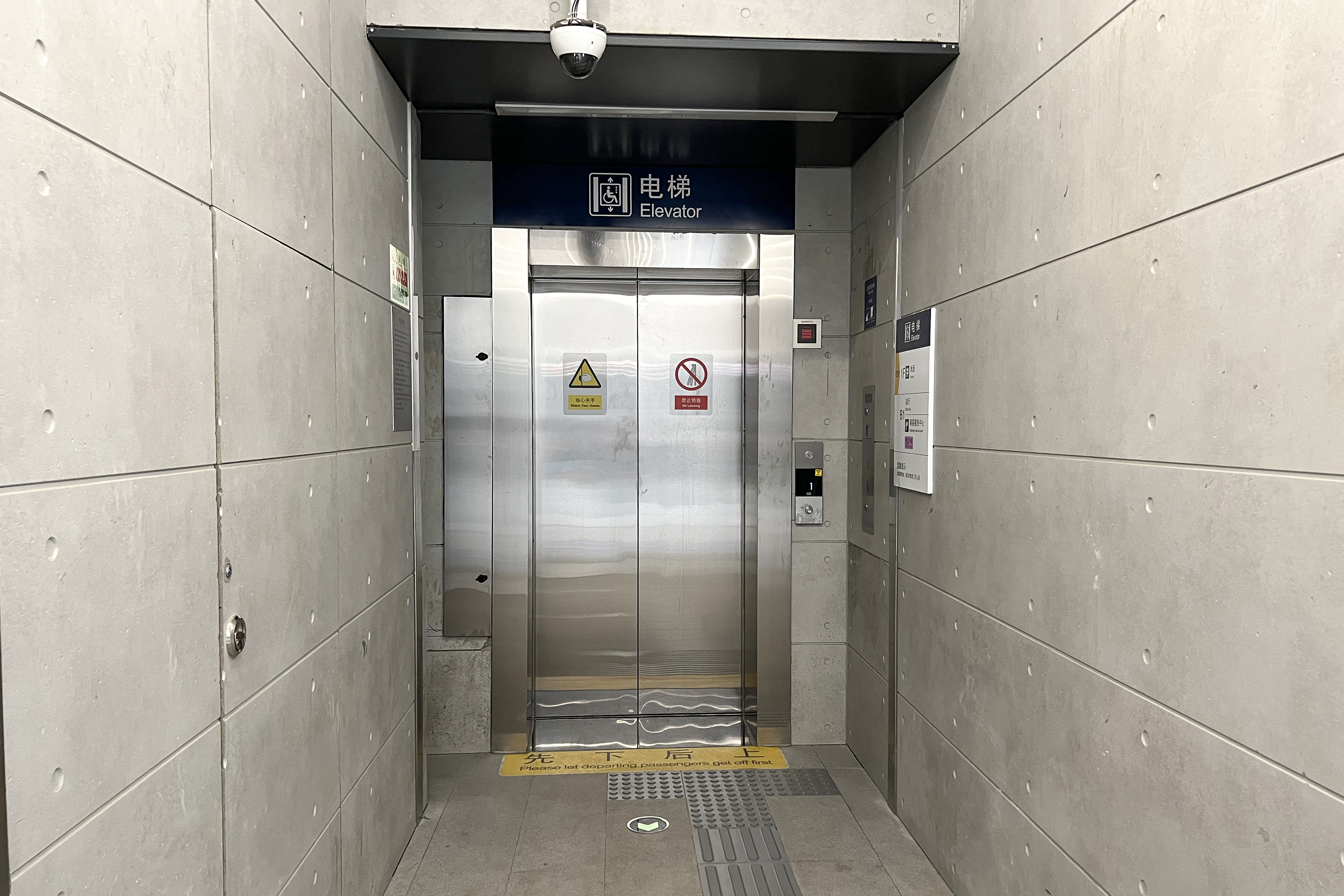
Exit A accessible exit

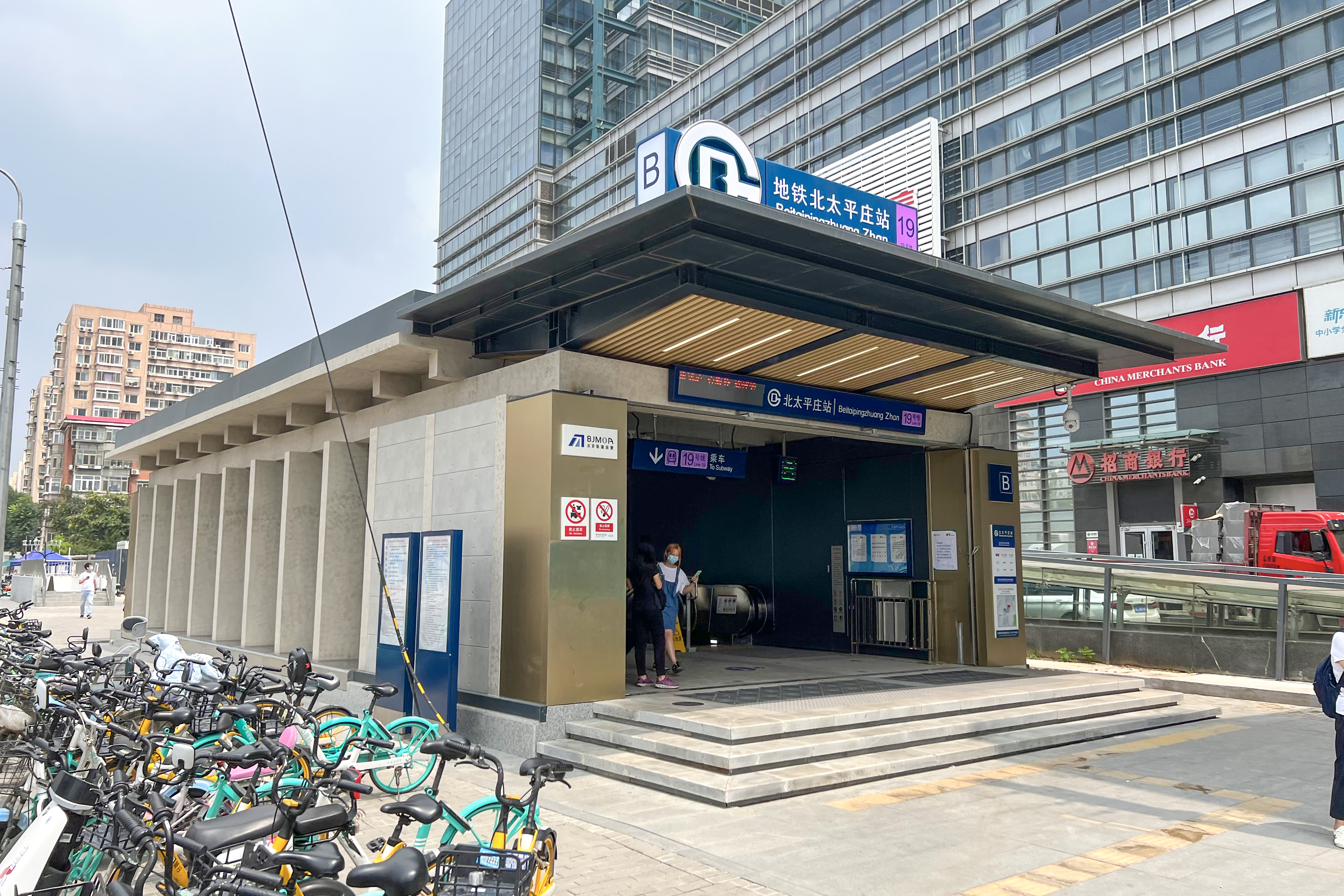
Exit B

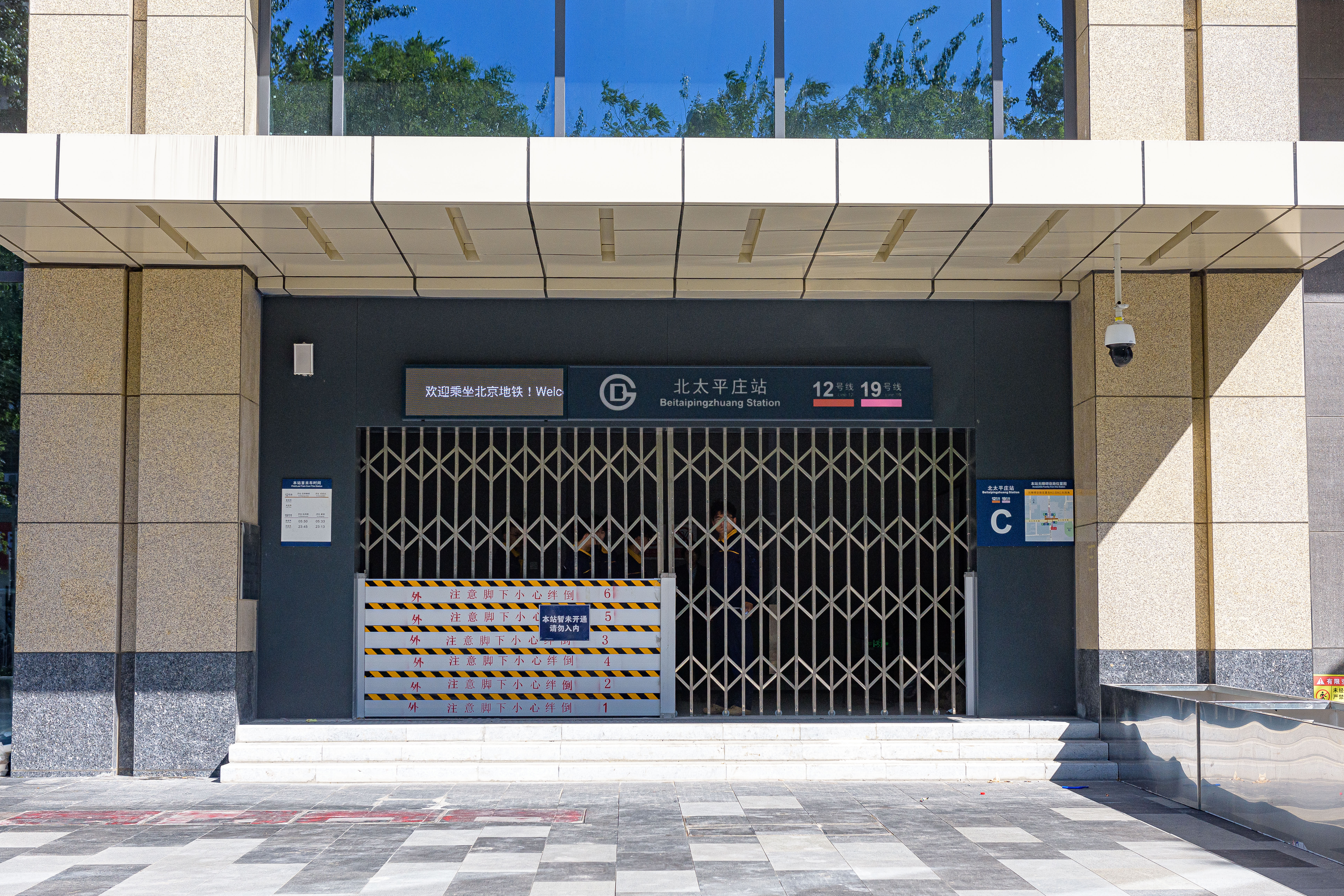
Exit C

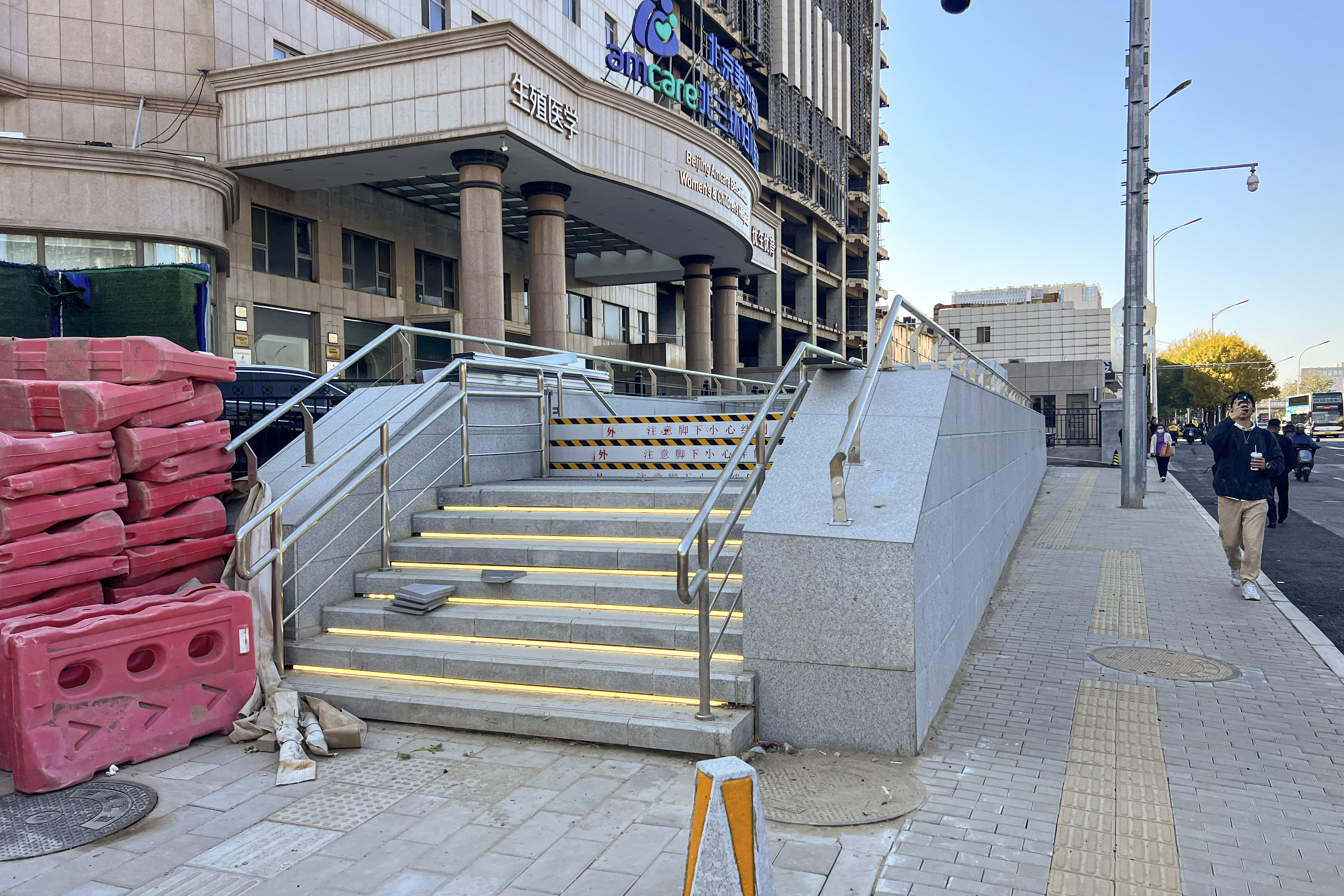
Exit D1

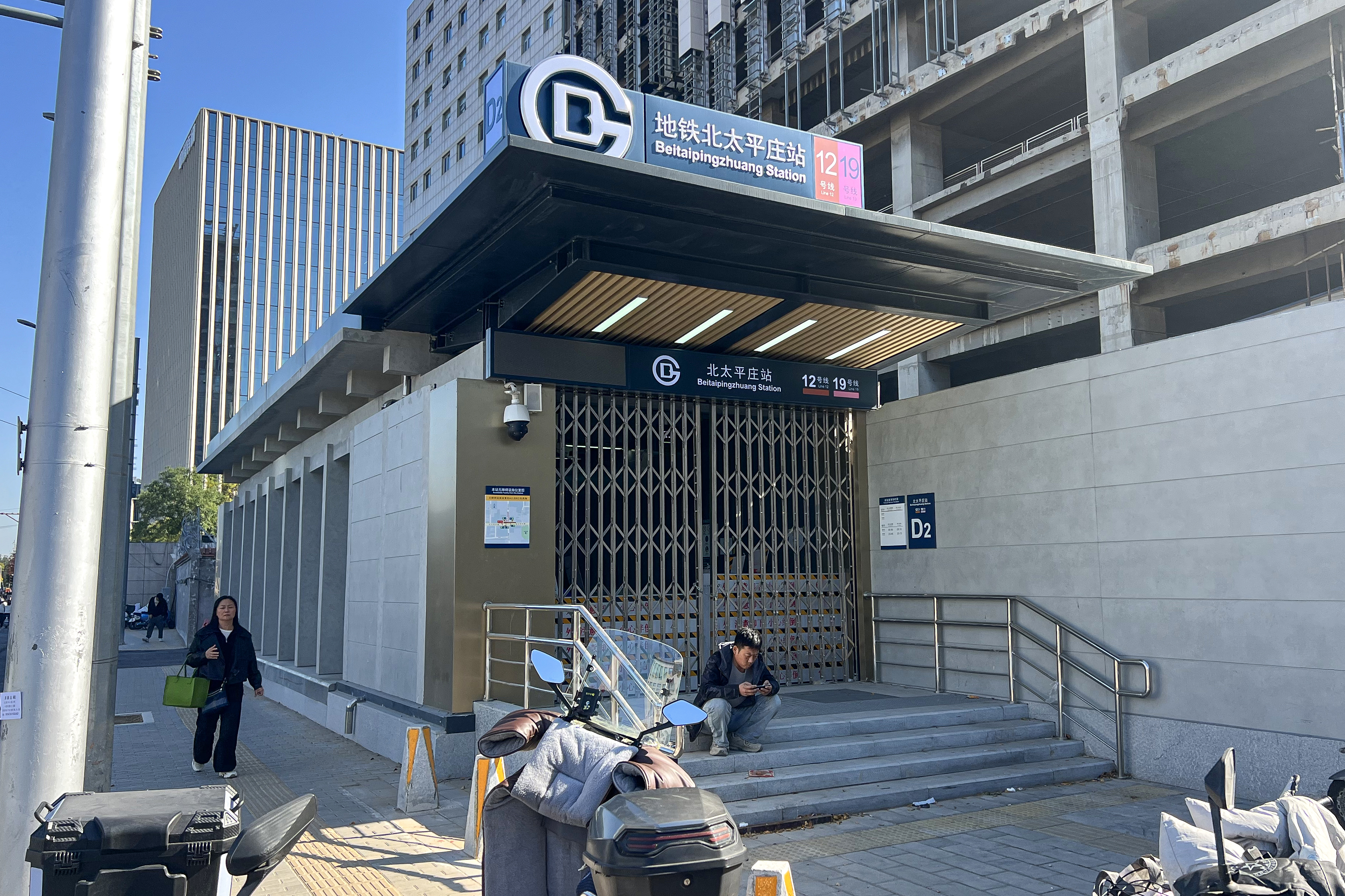
Exit D2

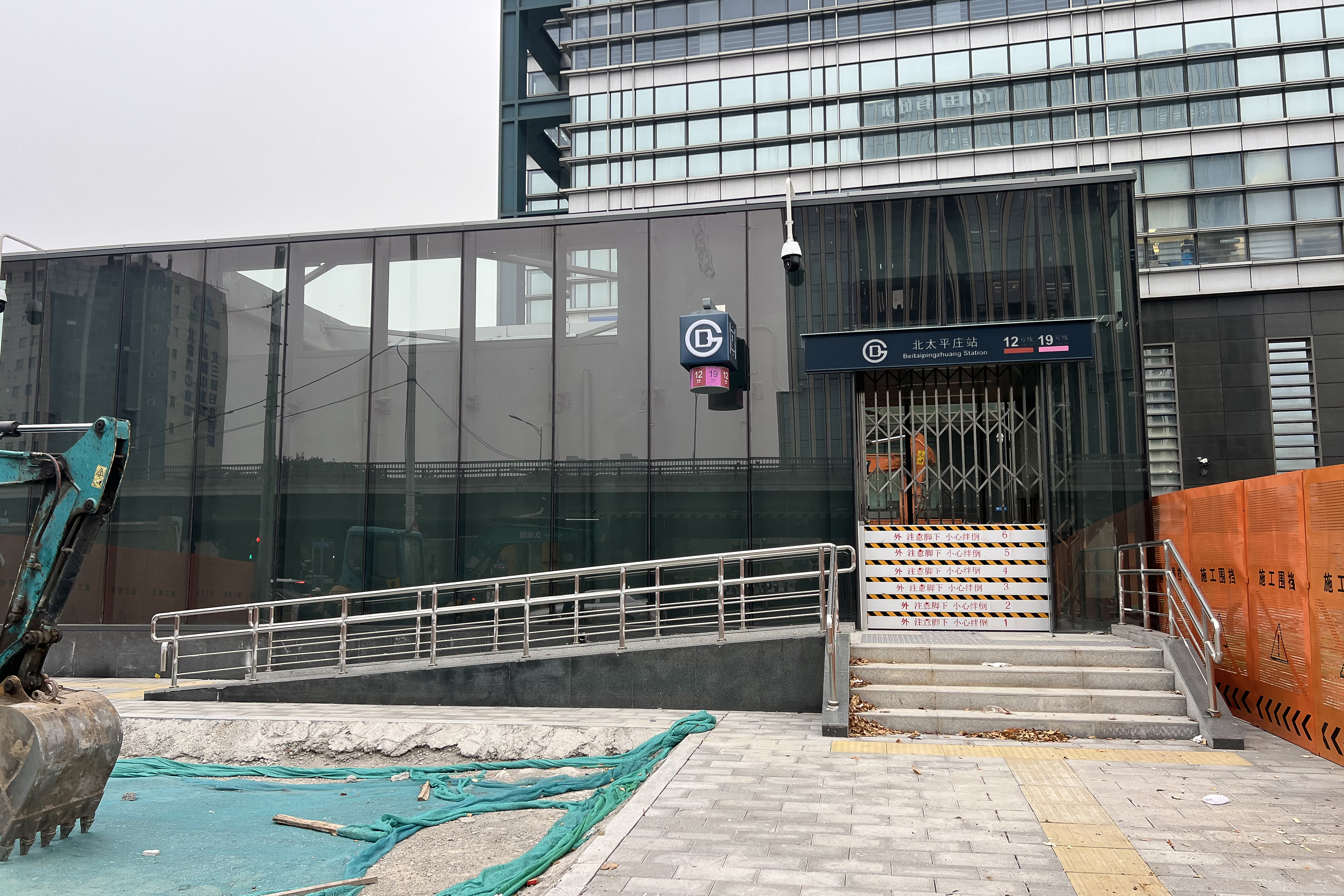
Unassigned accessible exit
