= Jimen Qiao station =

Beijing Subway Line 12 and Changping line station

Jimen Qiao 蓟门桥
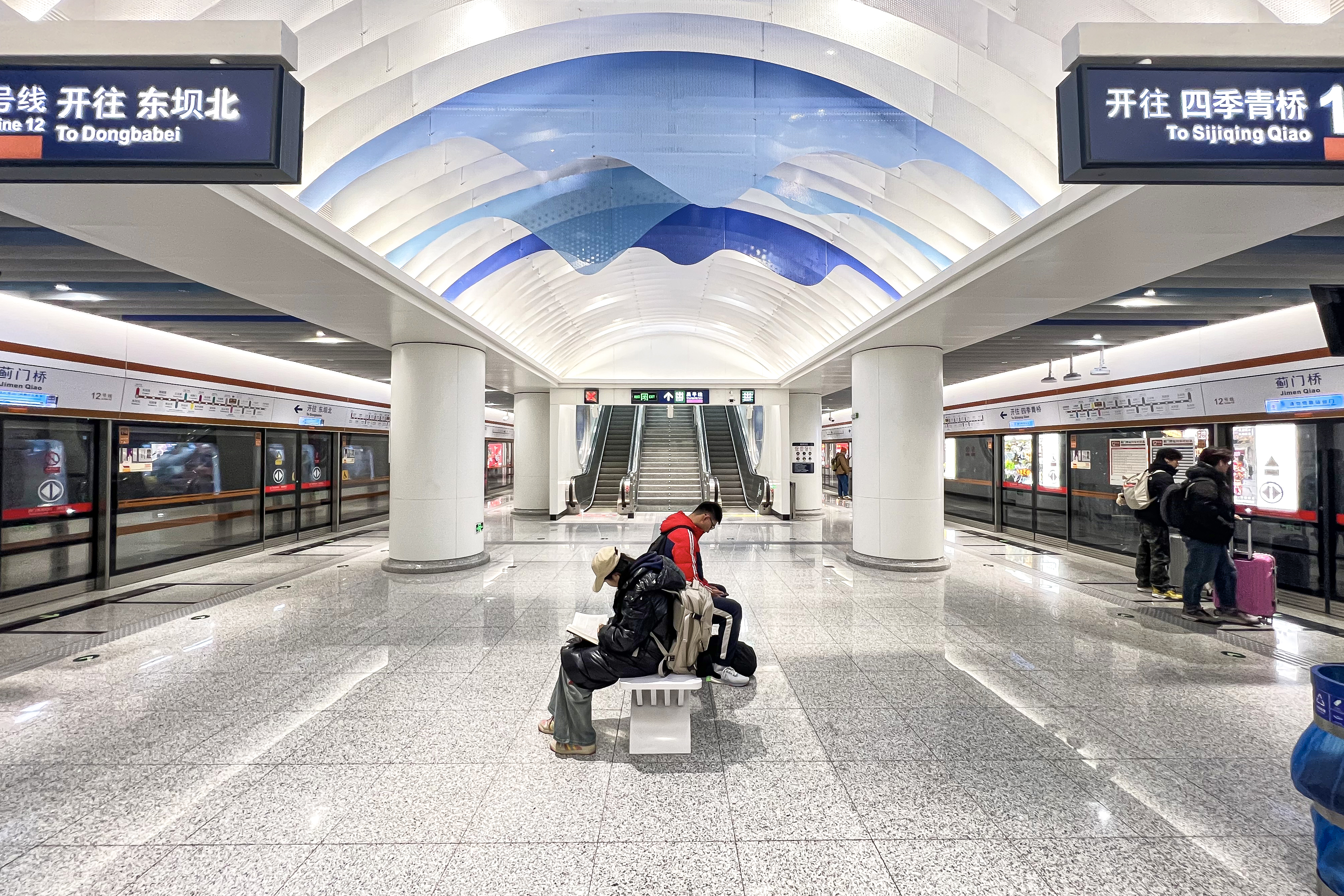
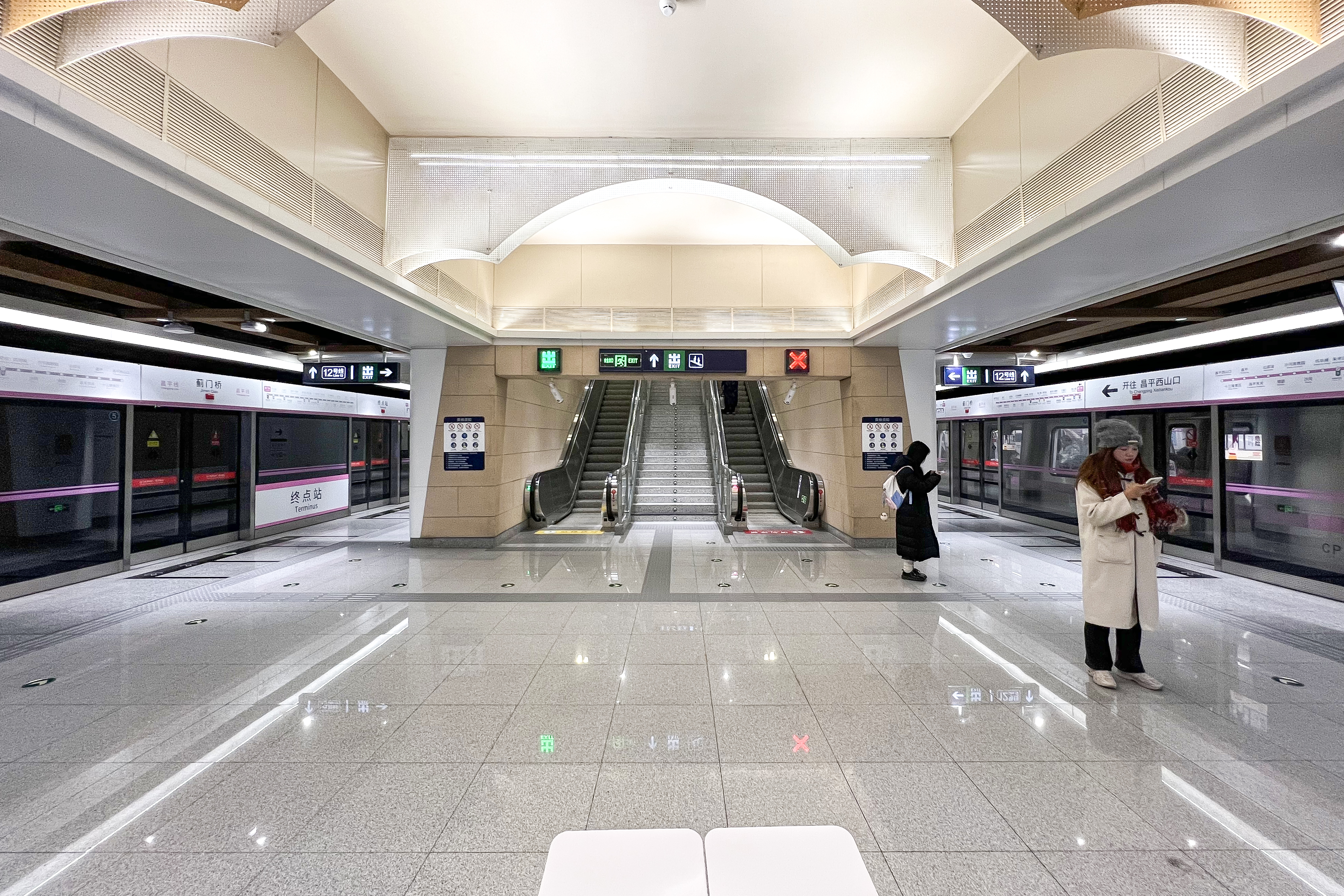
- Line 12 platform (December 2024) Changping Line platform (December 2024)

General information
- Location: Jimen Bridge (蓟门桥), Intersection of North Third Ring West Road, North Third Ring Middle Road and Xitucheng Road; Boundary of Beitaipingzhuang Subdistrict and Huayuanlu Subdistrict, Haidian District, Beijing; China
- Coordinates: 39.966304°N 116.349137°E
- Operator: Beijing Mass Transit Railway Operation Corporation Limited
- Lines: Line 12; Changping line
- Platforms: 4 (2 island platforms)
- Tracks: 4

Construction
- Structure type: Underground
- Accessible: Yes

History
- Opened: December 15, 2024; 20 months ago

Services
Preceding station	Beijing Subway	Following station
Dazhong Si towards Sijiqing Qiao	Line 12	Beitaipingzhuang towards Dongbabei
Xitucheng towards Changping Xishankou	Changping line	Terminus
Location
- Location within Beijing

Jimen Qiao station (Chinese: 蓟门桥站; pinyin: Jìmén Qiáo zhàn) is an interchange station between Line 12 and Changping line of the Beijing Subway. It opened on December 15, 2024, and is the southern terminus of Changping line.

== Layout ==
The station has underground island platforms for both Line 12 and Changping line.

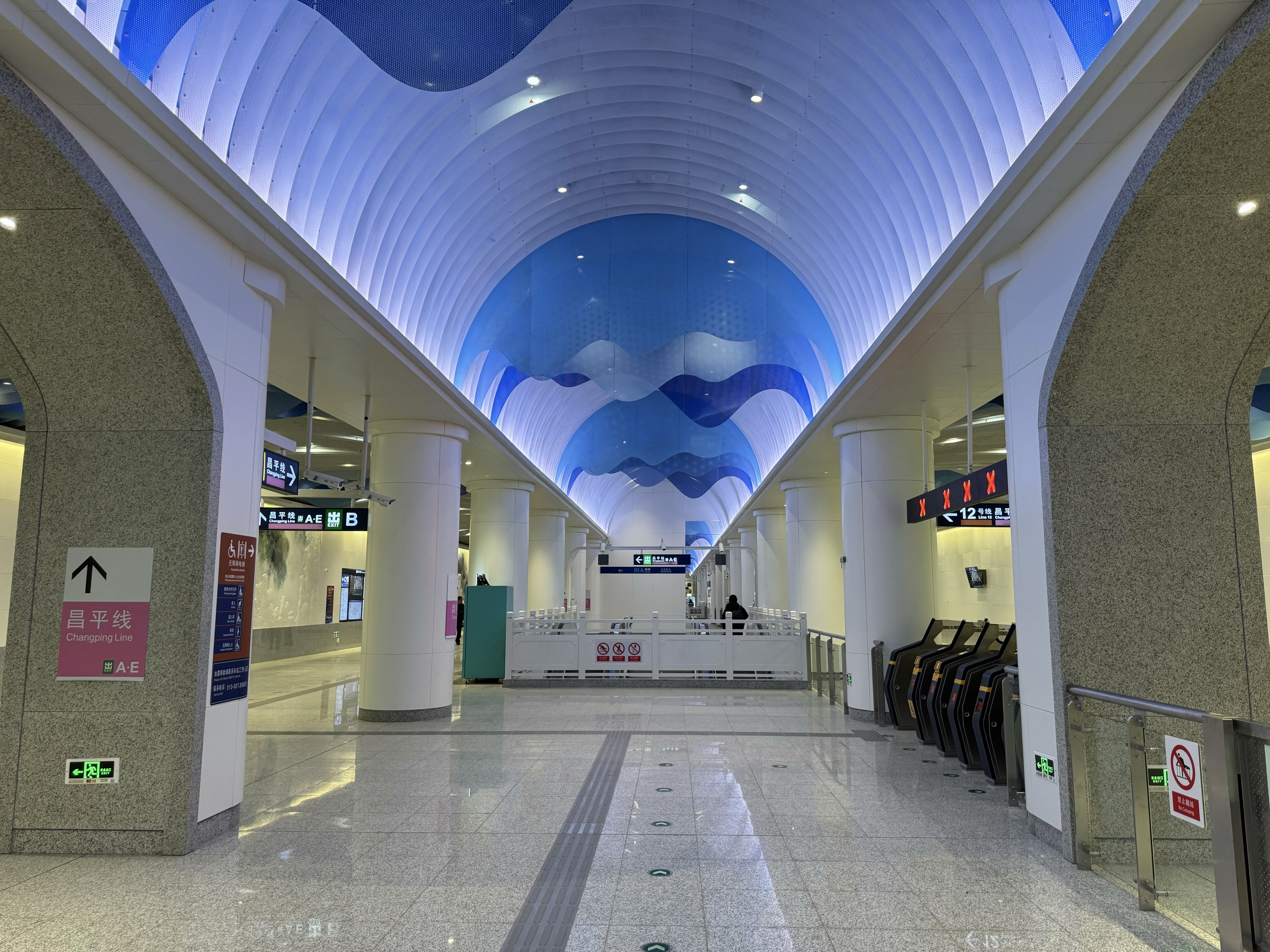
Line 12 concourse

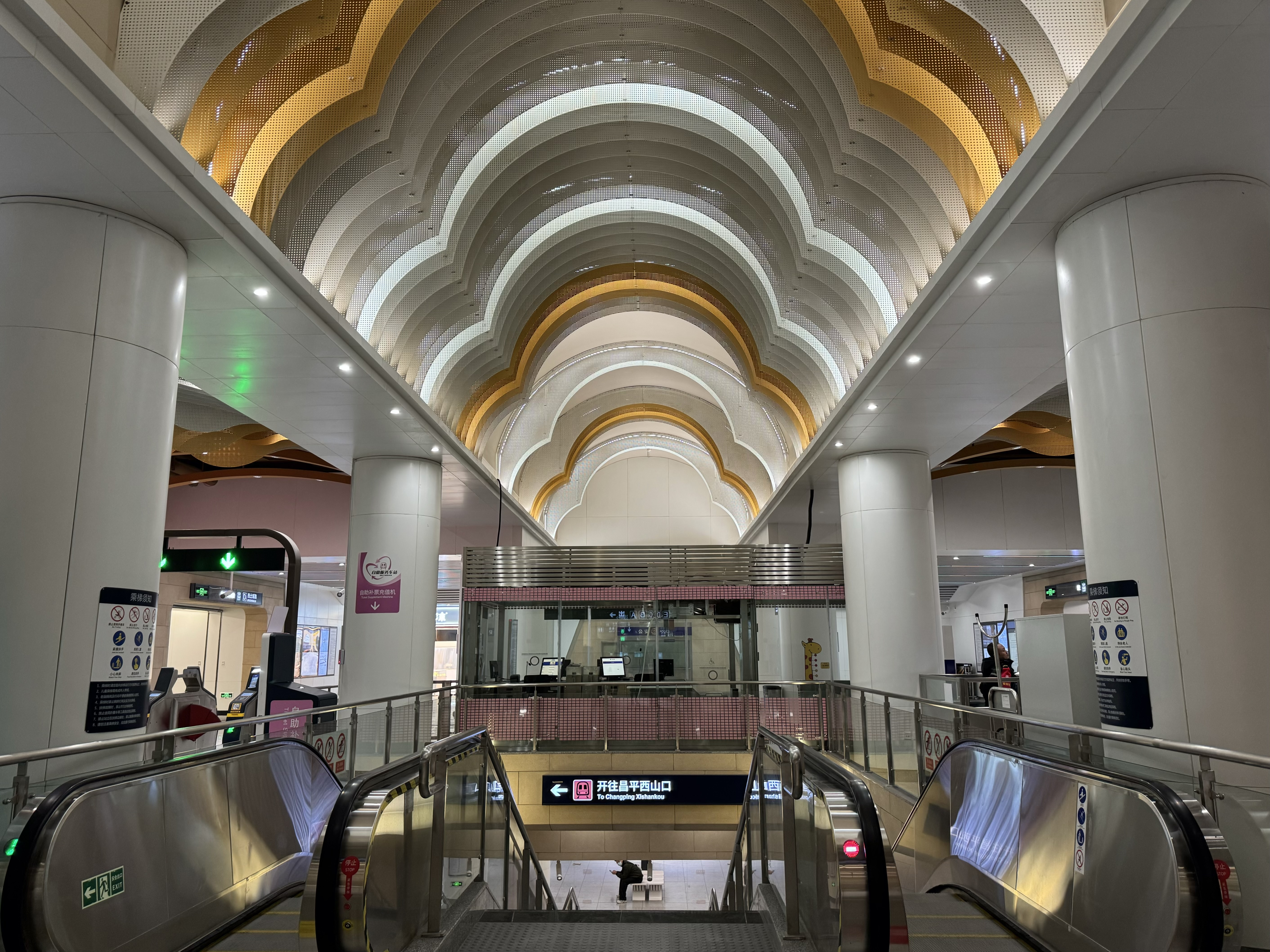
Changping Line concourse

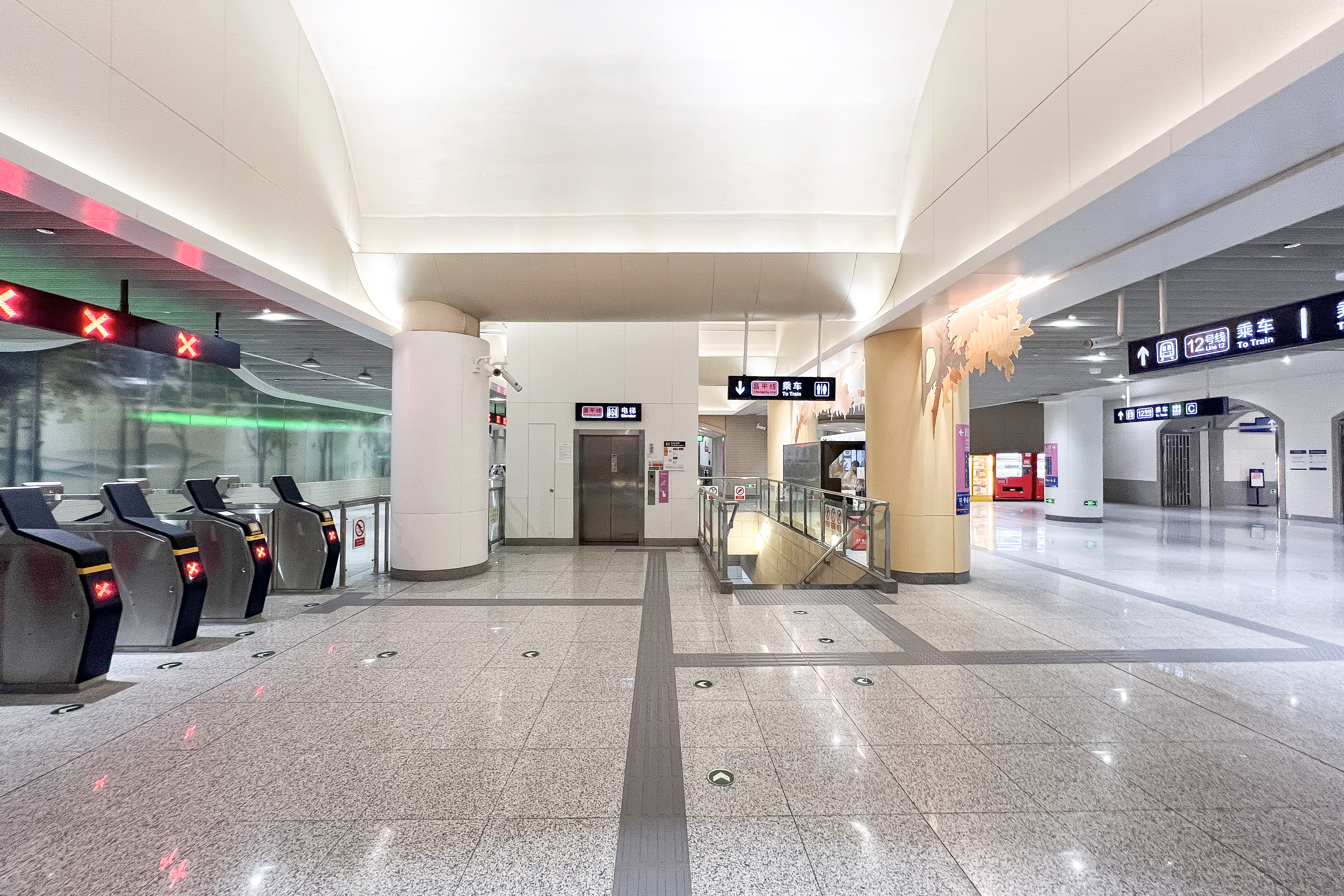
Changping line concourse (alternate view)

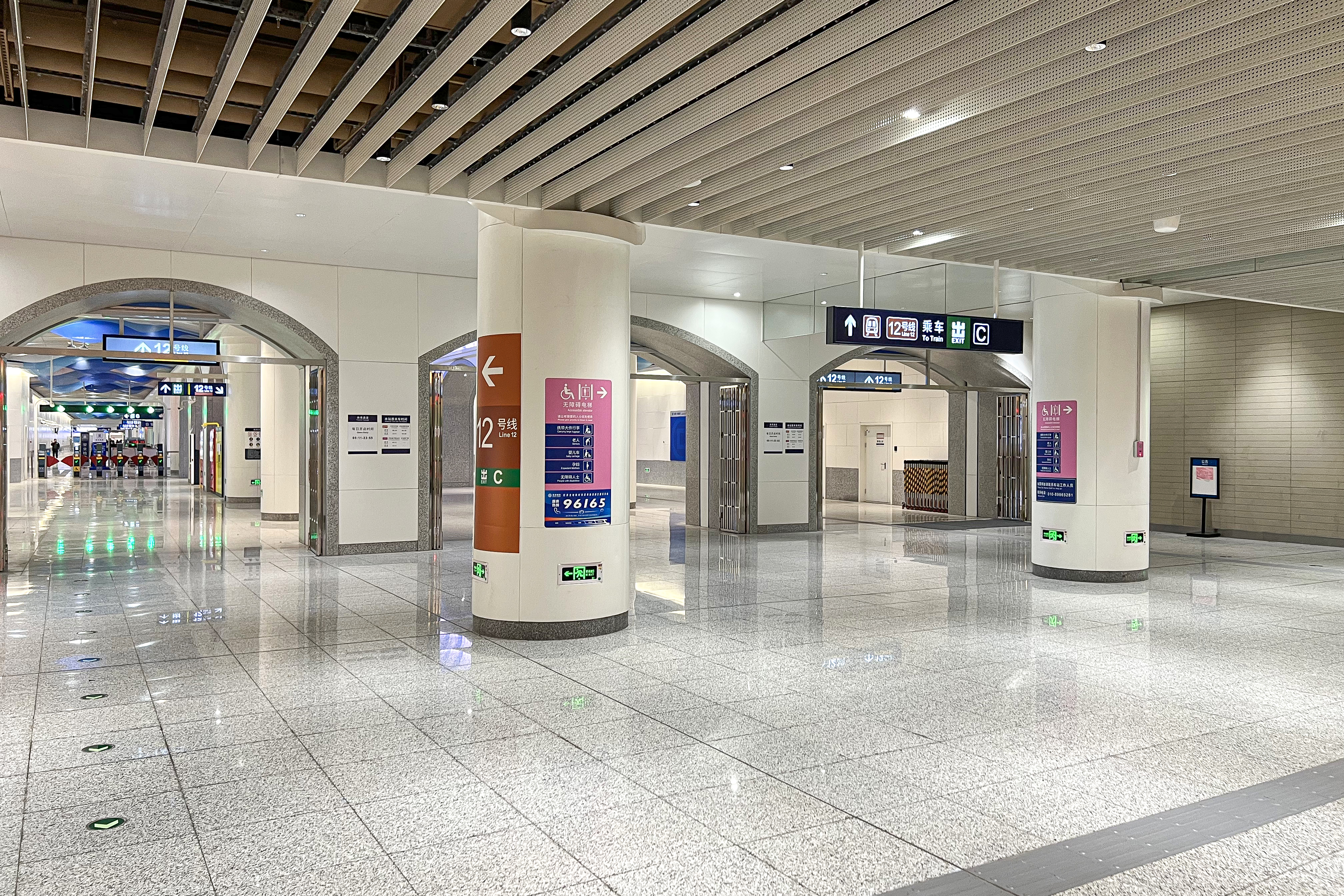
Changping line transfer passageway

== Station art ==
The two public art works of the Changping line station are themed with Jimen Yanshu, one of the Eight Great Sights in Yanjing. Among them, the wall of the non-paid area of the station hall is decorated with an art glass named "Yanshu Changning", and a metal sculpture of the smoke tree is arranged between the two pillars of the station hall, named "Yanshu Changning-2".

== Exits ==
There are 6 exits, lettered A, B1, B2, C, D and E. Exits C and D have accessible elevators.

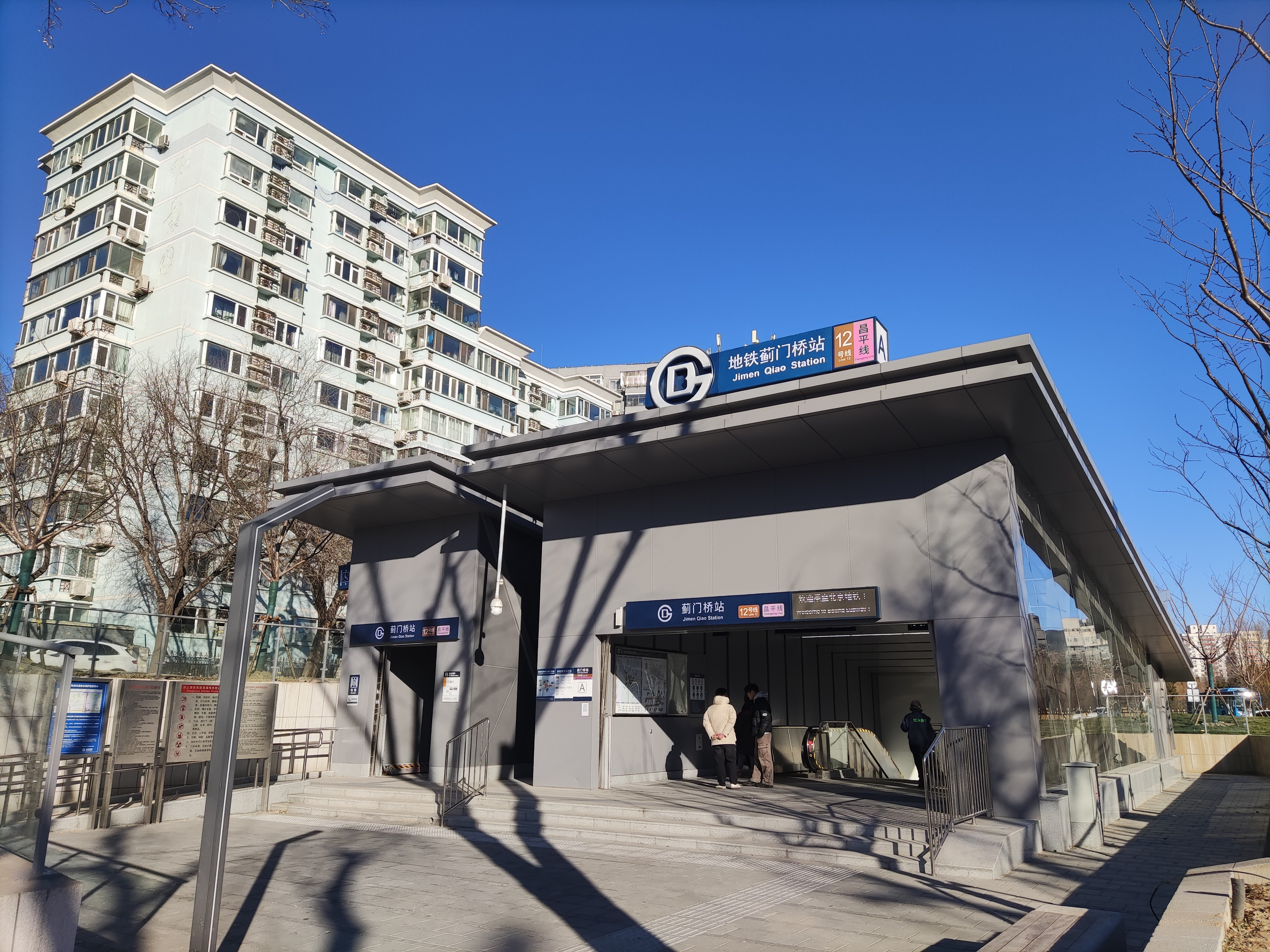
Exit A

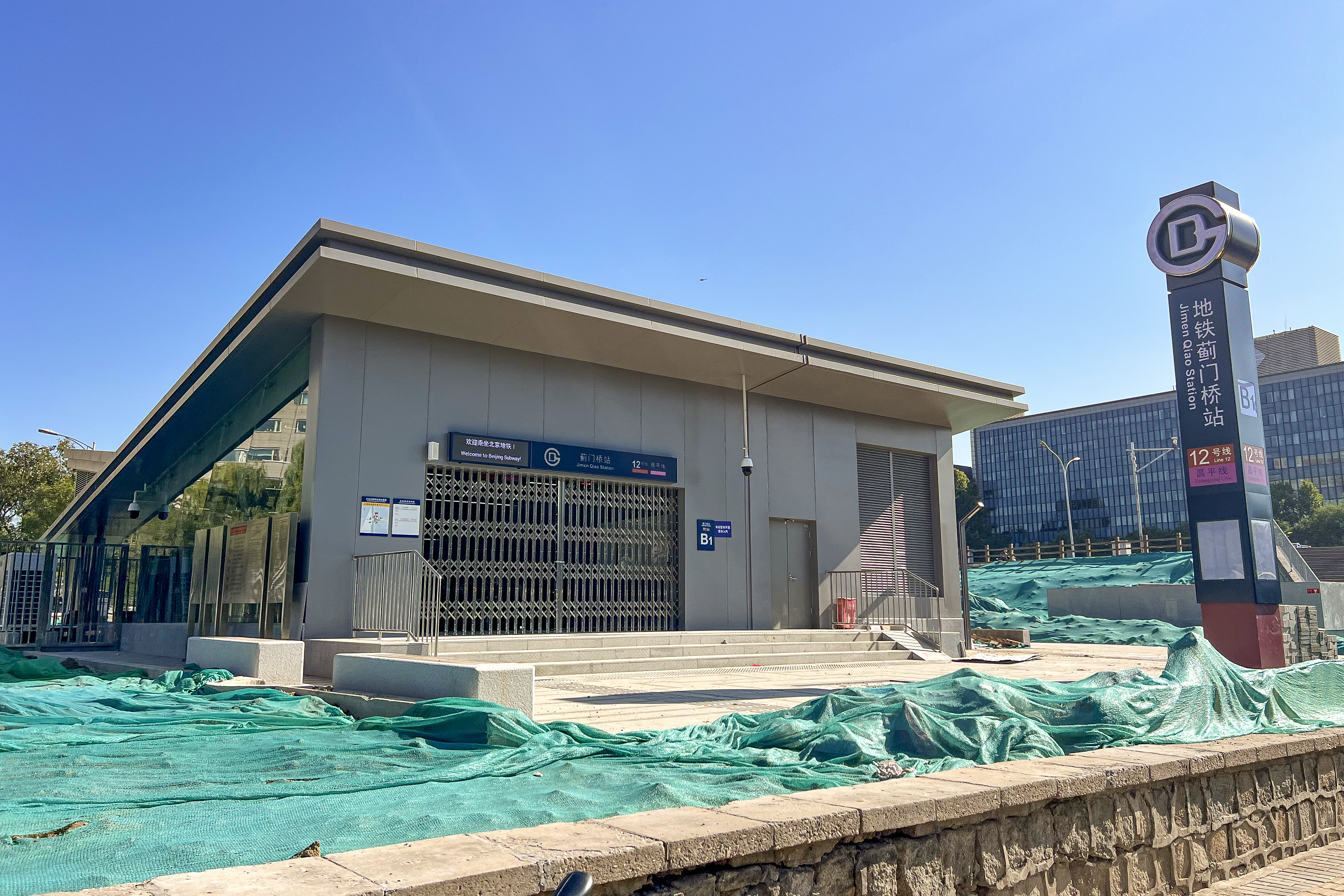
Exit B1

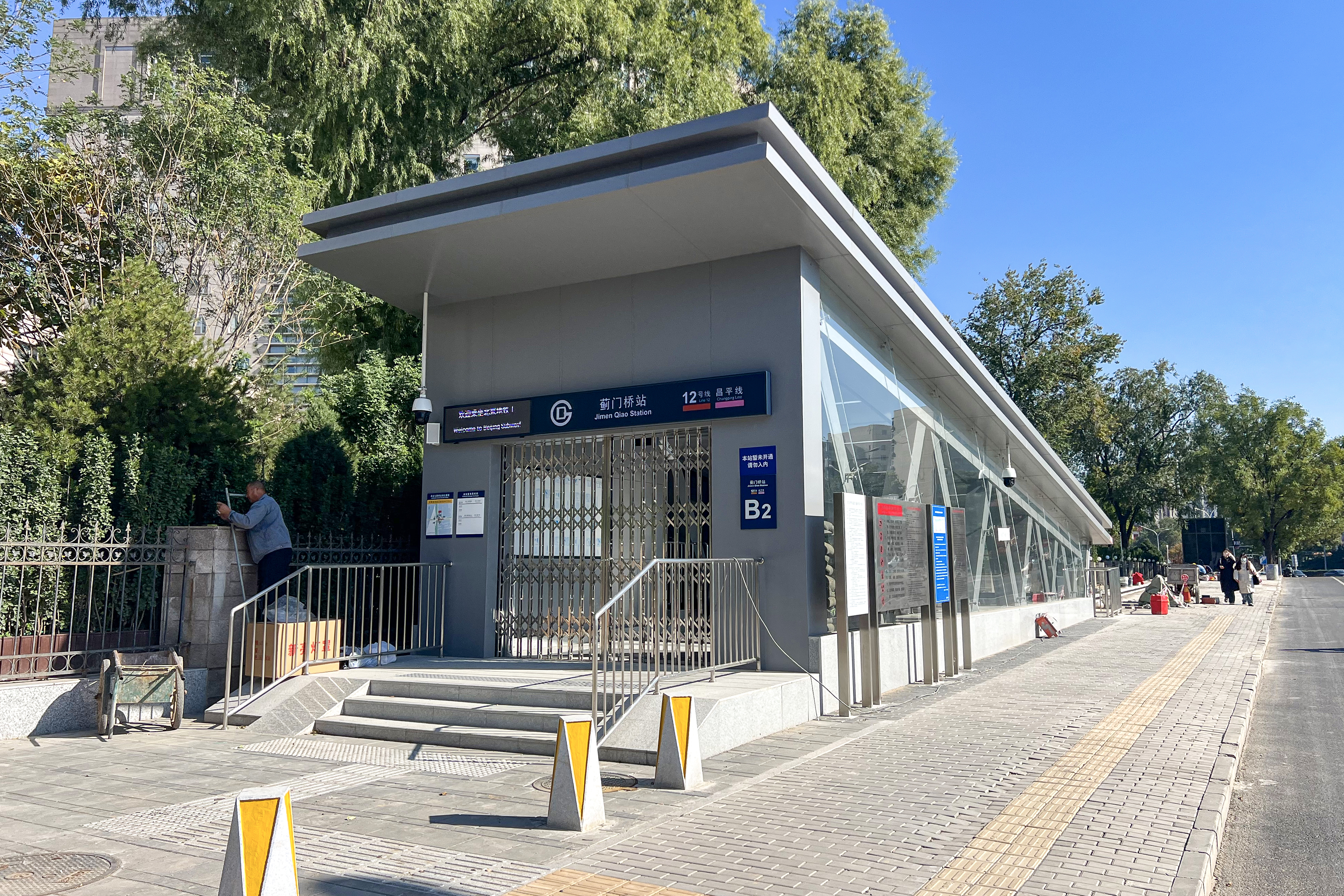
Exit B2

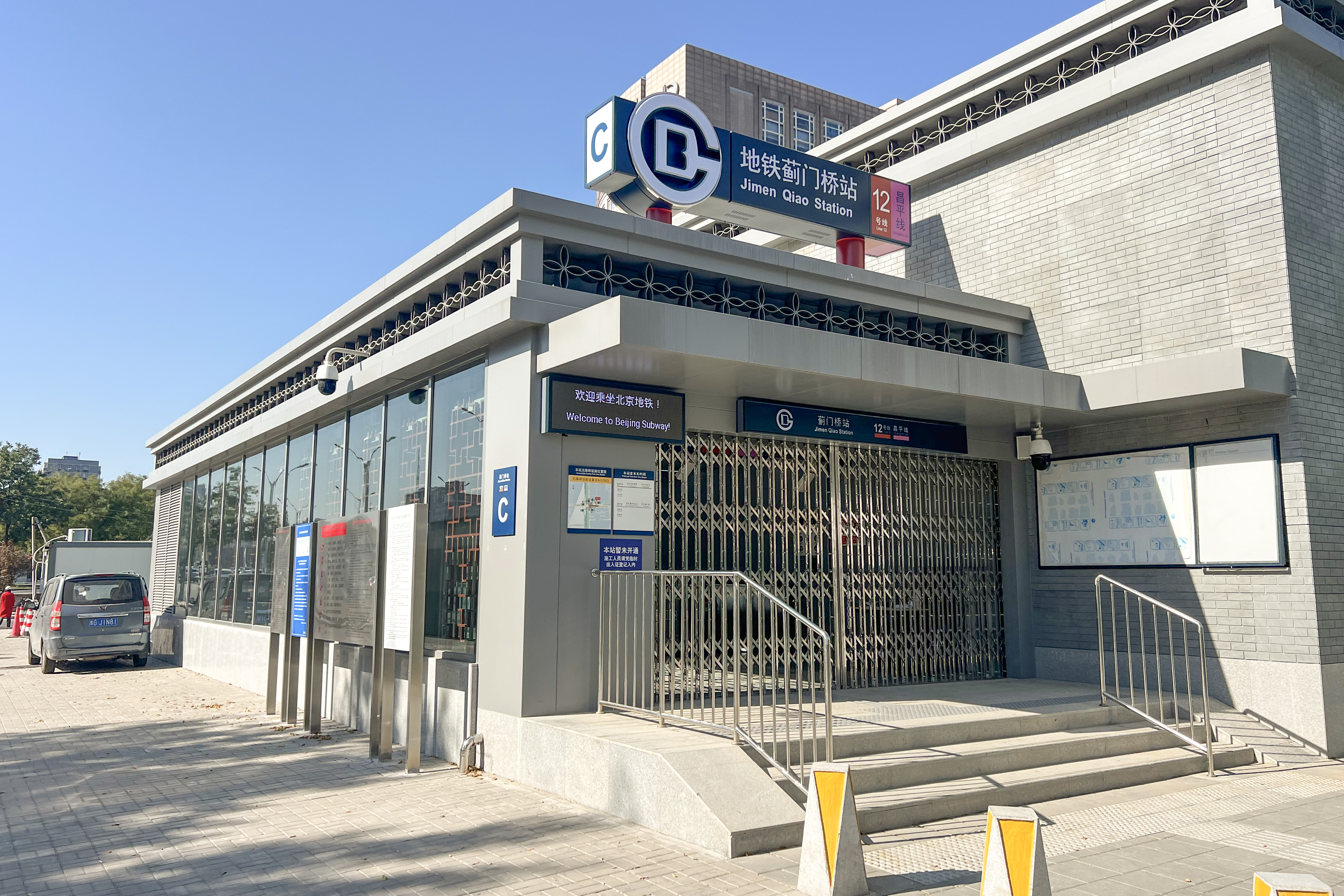
Exit C

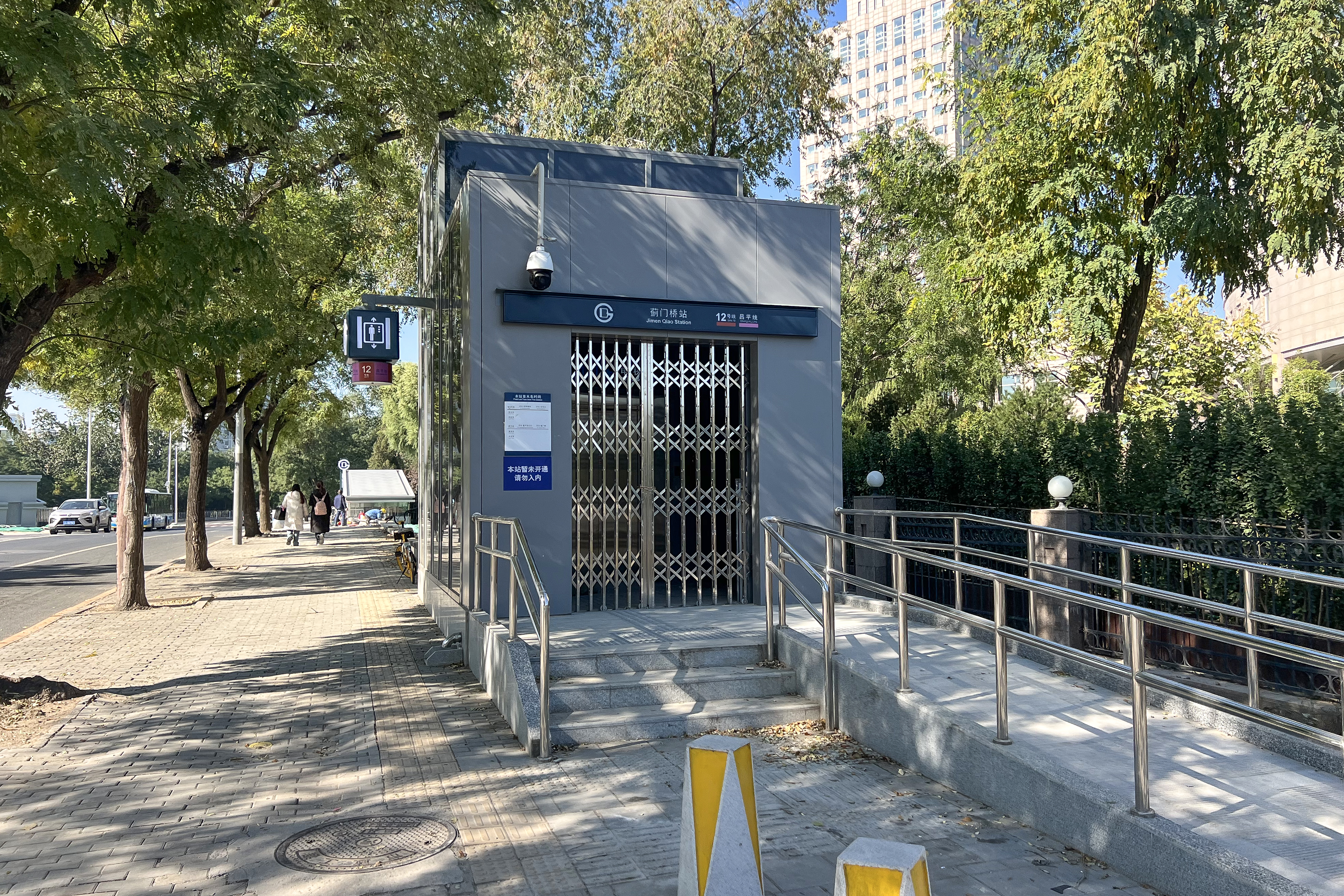
Exit C accessible exit

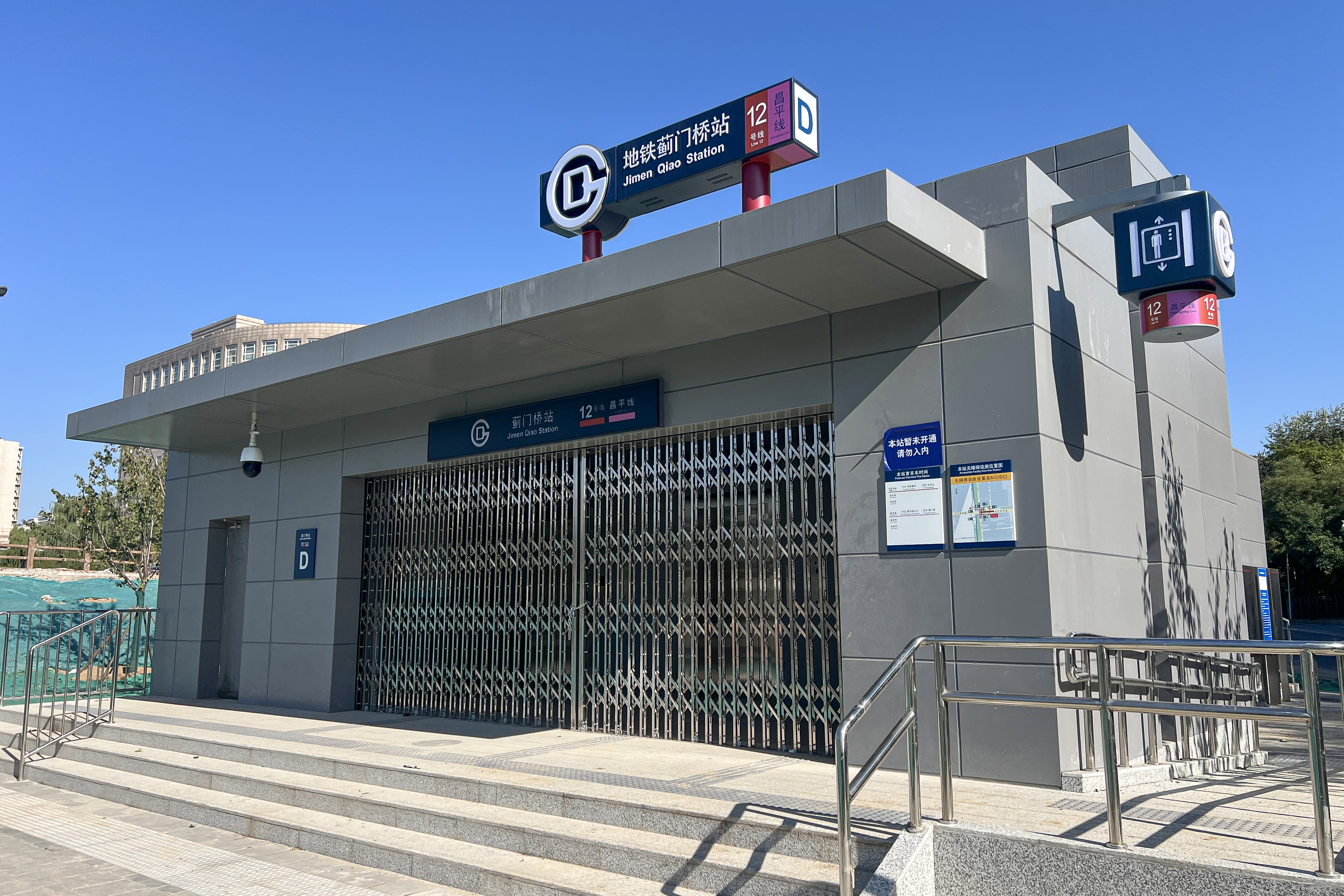
Exit D

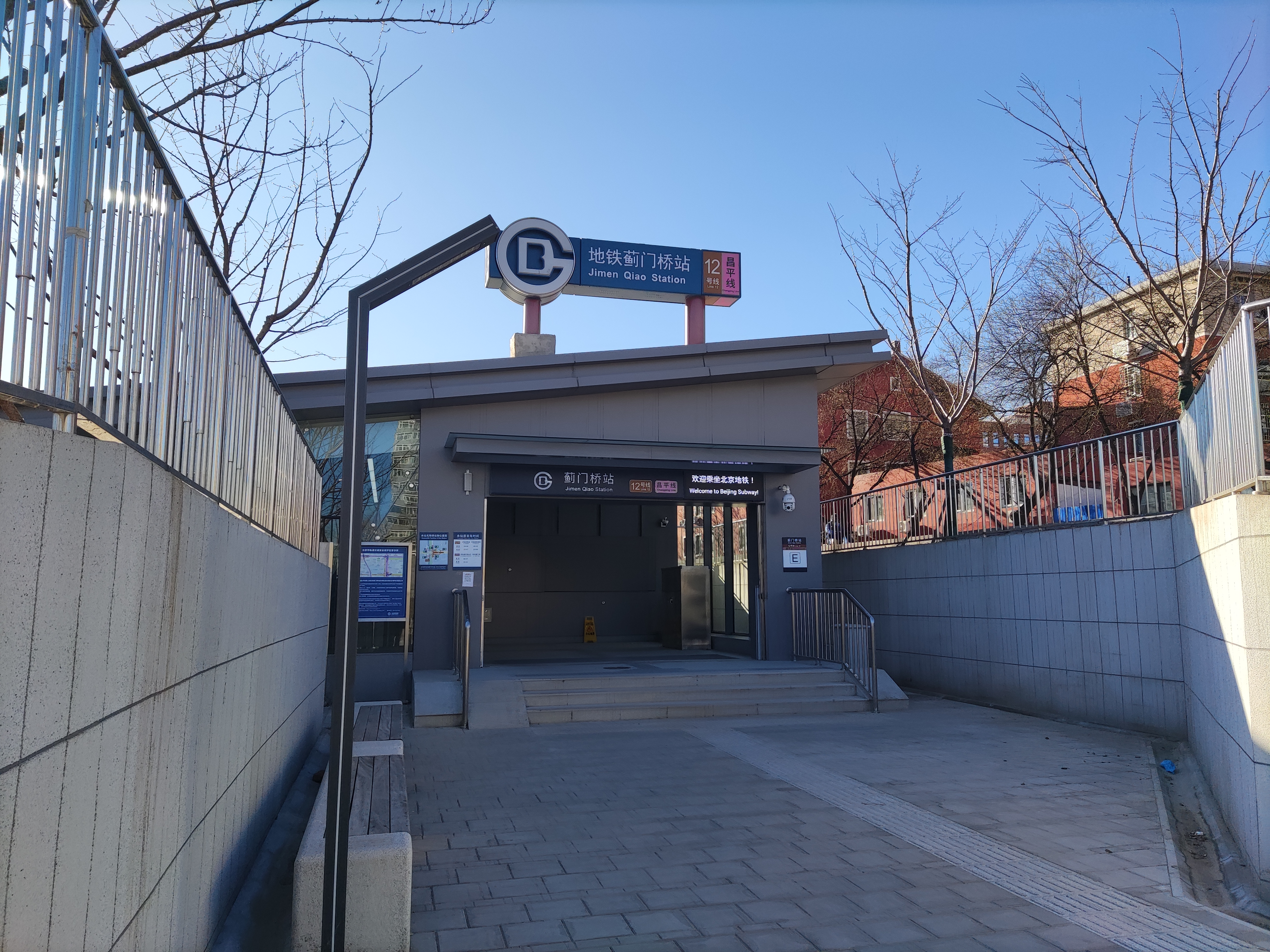
Exit E
